= Timeline of mosasaur research =

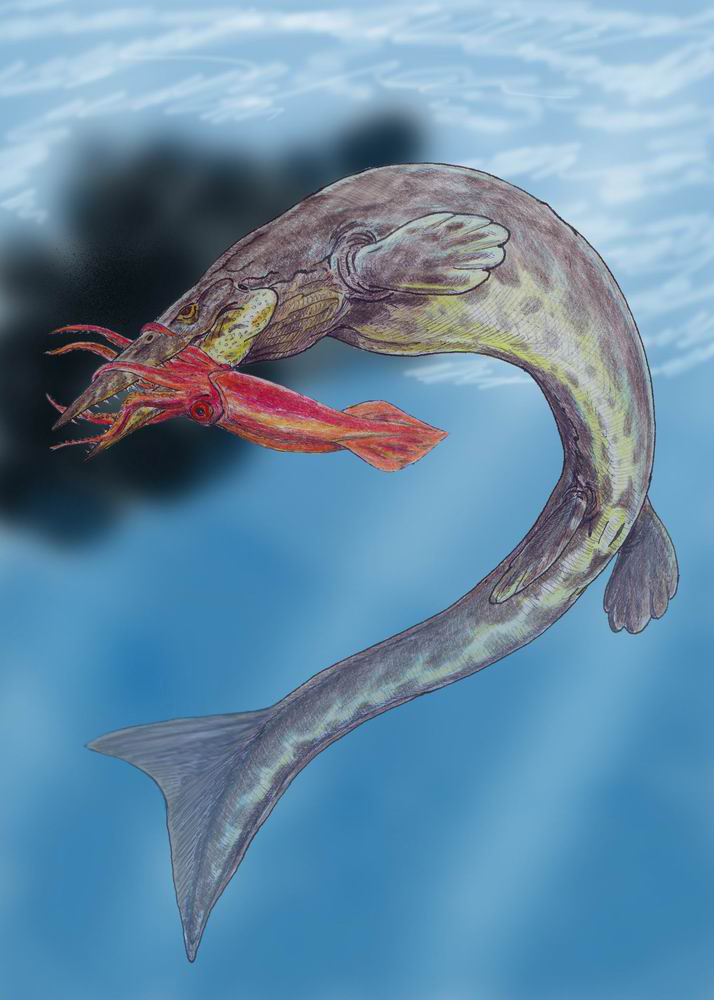
Life restoration of the mosasaur Hainosaurus feeding on a cephalopod

This timeline of mosasaur research is a chronologically ordered list of important fossil discoveries, controversies of interpretation, and taxonomic revisions of mosasaurs, a group of giant marine lizards that lived during the Late Cretaceous Epoch. Although mosasaurs went extinct millions of years before humans evolved, humans have coexisted with mosasaur fossils for millennia. Before the development of paleontology as a formal science, these remains would have been interpreted through a mythological lens. Myths about warfare between serpentine water monsters and aerial thunderbirds told by the Native Americans of the modern western United States may have been influenced by observations of mosasaur fossils and their co-occurrence with creatures like Pteranodon and Hesperornis.

The scientific study of mosasaurs began in the late 18th century with the serendipitous discovery of a large fossilized skeleton in a limestone mine near Maastricht in the Netherlands. The fossils were studied by local scholar Adriaan Gilles Camper, who noted a resemblance to modern monitor lizards in correspondence with renowned French anatomist Georges Cuvier. Nevertheless, the animal was not scientifically described until the English Reverend William Daniel Conybeare named it Mosasaurus, after the river Meuse located near the site of its discovery.

By this time the first mosasaur fossils from the United States were discovered by the Lewis and Clark Expedition, and the first remains in the country to be scientifically described were reported slightly later from New Jersey. This was followed by an avalanche of discoveries by the feuding Bone War paleontologists Edward Drinker Cope and Othniel Charles Marsh in the Smoky Hill Chalk of Kansas. By the end of the century a specimen of Tylosaurus would be found that preserved its scaley skin. Later Samuel Wendell Williston mistook fossilized tracheal rings for the remains of a fringe of skin running down the animal's back, which subsequently became a common inaccuracy in artistic restorations.

The 20th century soon saw the discovery in Alabama of a strange mosasaur called Globidens, with rounded teeth suited to crushing shells. Mosasaur remains were also discovered in Africa and California. In 1967 Dale Russell published a scientific monograph dedicated to mosasaurs. Embryonic remains in the 1990s confirmed that mosasaurs gave live birth like in ichthyosaurs. The 1990s also saw a revival and escalation of a debate regarding whether or not some supposed mosasaur toothmarks in ammonoid shells were actually made by limpets. By the end of the century, the evolutionary relationship between mosasaurs and snakes as well as the possible involvement of mosasaurs in the extinction of the aforementioned ichthyosaurs became hot button controversies.

The debates regarding snakes, toothmarks, and ichthyosaurs spilled over into the early 21st century. These discussions were also accompanied by the discovery of many new taxa, including new species of Globidens, Mosasaurus, and Tylosaurus as well as entirely new genera like Yaguarasaurus and Tethysaurus. In 2013, Lindgren, Kaddumi, and Polcyn reported the discovery of a Prognathodon specimen from Jordan that preserved the soft tissues of its scaley skin, flippers and tail. Significantly, the tail resembled those of modern carcharinid sharks, although the bottom lobe of the tail fin was longest in the mosasaur whereas shark tails have longer upper lobes.

== Prescientific ==
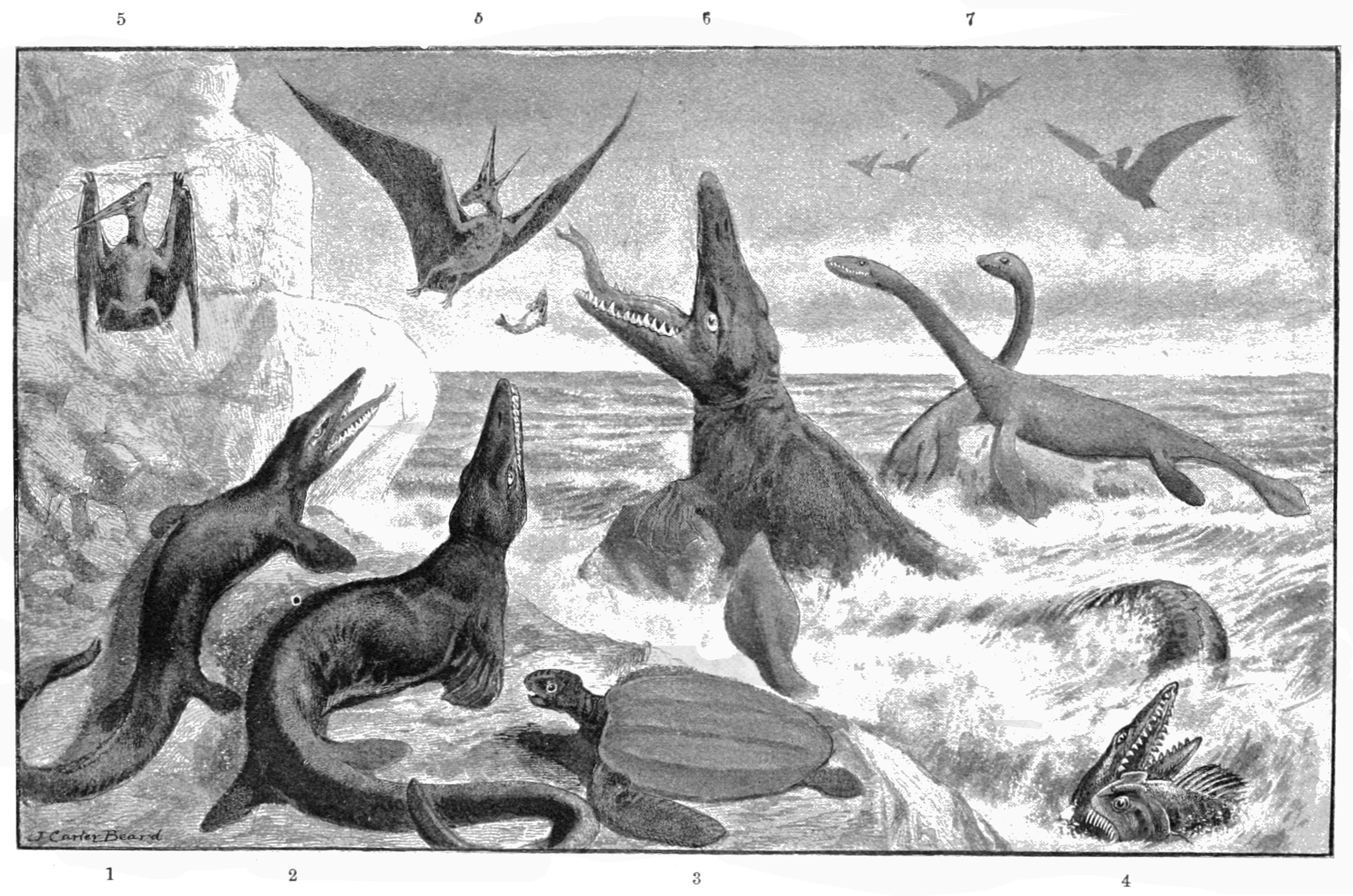
A 19th century restoration of the life of the Late Cretaceous Western Interior Seaway depicting a mosasaur attacking a Pteranodon. The basking behavior of the other marine reptiles is inaccurate as neither mosasaurs nor plesiosaurs were capable of leaving the water.

- One legend told among the Lenape (Delaware) people describes the discovery of a fragment of bone left by a monster that had once been killing people near modern Philadelphia in either Pennsylvania or eastern New Jersey. When the hunting party brought the piece of bone back to the village, a wise man encouraged them to set out and find more of the monsters remains. He said that smoking fragments of the bone with tobacco in a small clay spoon could grant wishes like good health for one's children, longevity, or successful hunting. Fossils of the mosasaur Tylosaurus have been found in the area, but dinosaurs and Cretaceous crocodiles are also possible sources. This legend likely predates European contact and may have originated prior to 1500. The bones being burnt in the "clay spoon" is a reference to a primitive kind of clay pipe that the local people had abandoned in favor of a design with a deeper bowl by the 17th century. The general lack of any sign of influence by European culture on the tale is also suggestive of its great antiquity.
- The Cheyenne people of Nebraska believed in mythical thunderbirds and water monsters that were in endless conflict with each other. The thunderbirds were said to resemble giant eagles and killed both people and animals with arrows made of lightning. The fossils of the Niobrara Chalk may have been influential on these stories. The pterosaur Pteranodon and marine reptiles like mosasaurs are preserved in Niobrara Chalk deposits and associated remains may have been interpreted as evidence for antagonism between immense flying animals and serpentine aquatic reptiles. Observations of similar fossils in the past may have been seen as further evidence for thunderbird-water monster conflict.

The Cheyenne believe that there were many different kinds of water monsters that lived not only in lakes, rivers, and springs but also high bluffs and hills. The locations given as water monster habitat are similar to the locations where local marine fossils can be found as fossils often erode out of hillsides or stream banks. The Cheyennes feared the water monsters, because they could be dangerous predators or capsize their canoes. Even in modern times, tradition-minded Cheyenne sometimes take pains to avoid sleeping too close to springs due to fears of water monsters.

- The Crow people also believed in water monsters. These were said to be alligator-like creatures living in the Little Bighorn, Rosebud, and Tongue Rivers. These myths may have been based on discoveries of marine reptile fossils such as mosasaurs and crocodilians eroding out of the river banks. The Crow also believe there were similar alligator-like monsters in the Missouri River. These were called Bulukse'e or Buruksam Wurukce, names meaning "large meat-eater" but commonly translated as "giant lizard or alligator".
- When the Sioux people lived around the Great Lakes, they imagined their mythical Water Monster Unktehi as a large aquatic buffalo-like mammal. This image was likely derived from early observations of large Pleistocene mammal fossils such as mammoths and mastodons eroding out of the banks of local lakes and rivers. As some groups of Sioux began moving west into the regions that includes Montana their depictions of Unktehi tended to converge on the characteristics of local fossils. Although Unktehi continued to be described as horned, it gradually became imagined as reptilian rather than the mammalian portrayals of the Sioux in the Great Lakes region, like the dinosaurs and mosasaurs of the region's Mesozoic rock. Unktehi was described as a snakelike monster equipped with feet, like the elongate sinuous mosasaurs who had four short limbs. Its back was described as ridged and saw-like, a configuration similar to the appearance of a fossil vertebral column eroding from rock.

== 18th century ==
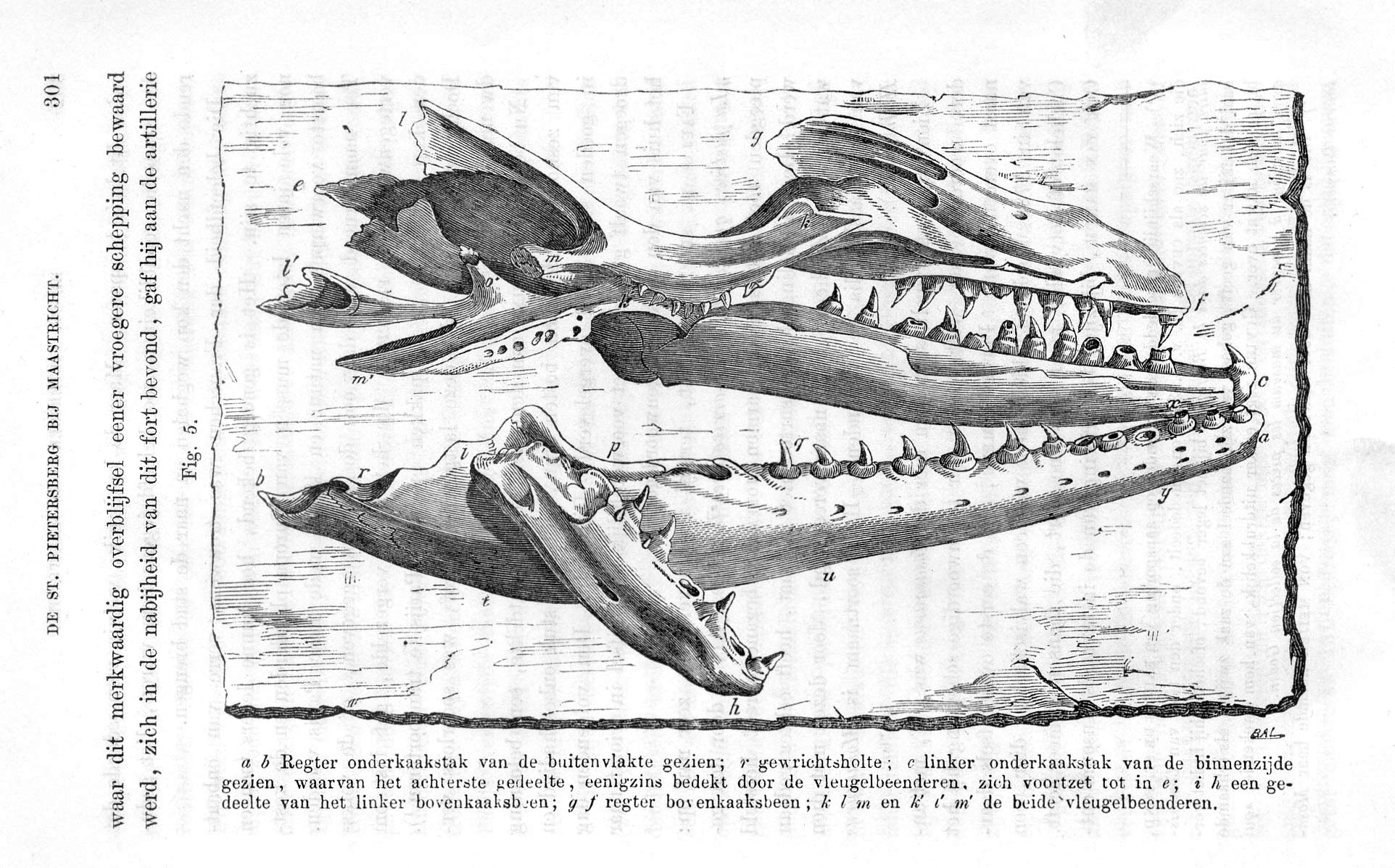
Illustration of the type specimen of Mosasaurus

=== 1760s ===
==== 1764 ====
- The first documented mosasaurid skull is found in the chalk quarries of the St Pietersberg near Maastricht, the Netherlands.

==== 1766 ====
- The skull was acquired by lieutenant Jean Baptiste Drouin.

=== 1770s ===
==== 1772 ====
- Around 1772, limestone miners discovered a second skull of a bizarre animal deep underground near Maastricht. The owner of the land containing the mine, canon Theodorus Joannes Godding, displayed it in his country house. Army surgeon John Leonard Hoffman observed the fossil, corresponding with various naturalists about it.

=== 1780s ===
==== 1784 ====
- Drouin sold the first St Pietersberg mosasaur skull to the Teylers Museum at Haarlem where it is still curated today under the catalogue number TM 7424.

=== 1790s ===
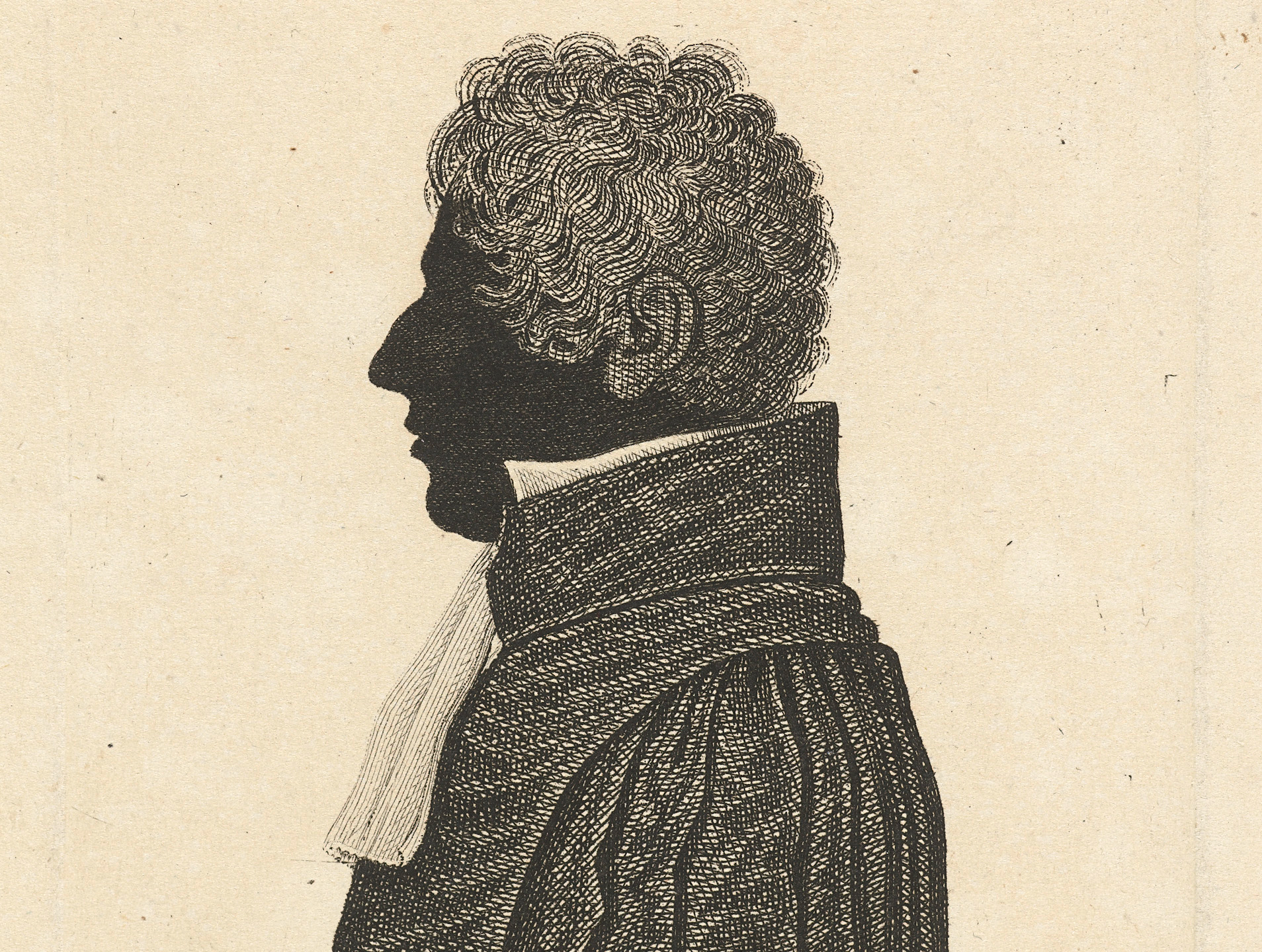
Silhouette of Adriaan Gilles Camper

==== 1795 ====
- The French revolutionary army took over both Maastricht and Goddin's astonishing fossil. The French misplaced the fossil for a period, before rediscovering it and sending it to Paris for further study.

==== 1798 ====
- Adriaan Gilles Camper recognized that the unusual animal resembled a giant monitor lizard, and wrote to Georges Cuvier in Paris stating such.

==== 1799 ====
- Camper continued his correspondence with Cuvier and reiterated his opinion that the remains from Maastricht belong to a giant monitor lizard.

== 19th century ==
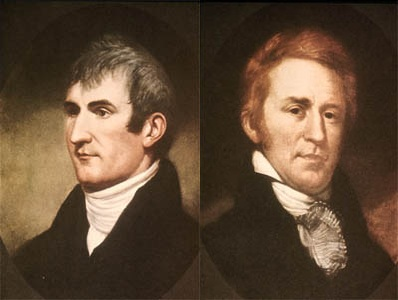
Meriwether Lewis (left) and William Clark (right)

=== 1800s ===
==== 1804 ====
September 10th

- The Lewis and Clark Expedition reportedly found the skeleton of a gigantic snake in an island on the Missouri River in territory now belonging to the state of South Dakota. These remains actually probably belong to a mosasaur, possibly Mosasaurus missouriensis. Some of the bones were sent back to Washington, D.C.

=== 1810s ===
==== 1818 ====
- Mitchell reported the discovery of mosasaur fossils in the Navesink Formation of New Jersey. These were the first North American mosasaur remains to be documented in the scientific literature.

=== 1820s ===
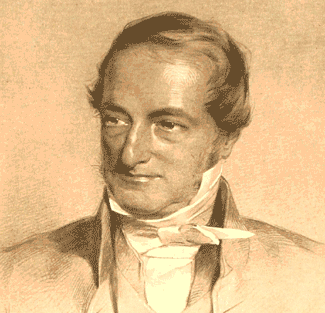
Portrait of Rev. William Conybeare

==== 1820 ====
- Samuel von Sömmerring described the new species Lacerta gigantea for fossils discovered in a Bavarian iron mine, mistakenly believing them to be additional remains of the same kind of animal that was discovered in Maastricht. These remains belonged to an animal that was actually more closely related to modern crocodiles and is now known as Geosaurus.

==== 1822 ====
- Reverend William Daniel Conybeare formally named the animal from Maastricht Mosasaurus after a river located near the discovery site.

==== 1829 ====
- Major Benjamin O'Fallon discovered a mosasaur in what is now South Dakota, near the Great Bend of the Missouri River. He brought it home to St. Louis and later sold it to Prince Maximilian of Wied.
- Gideon Mantell applied the species epithet "hoffmanni" to the Mosasaurus type species.

=== 1830s ===
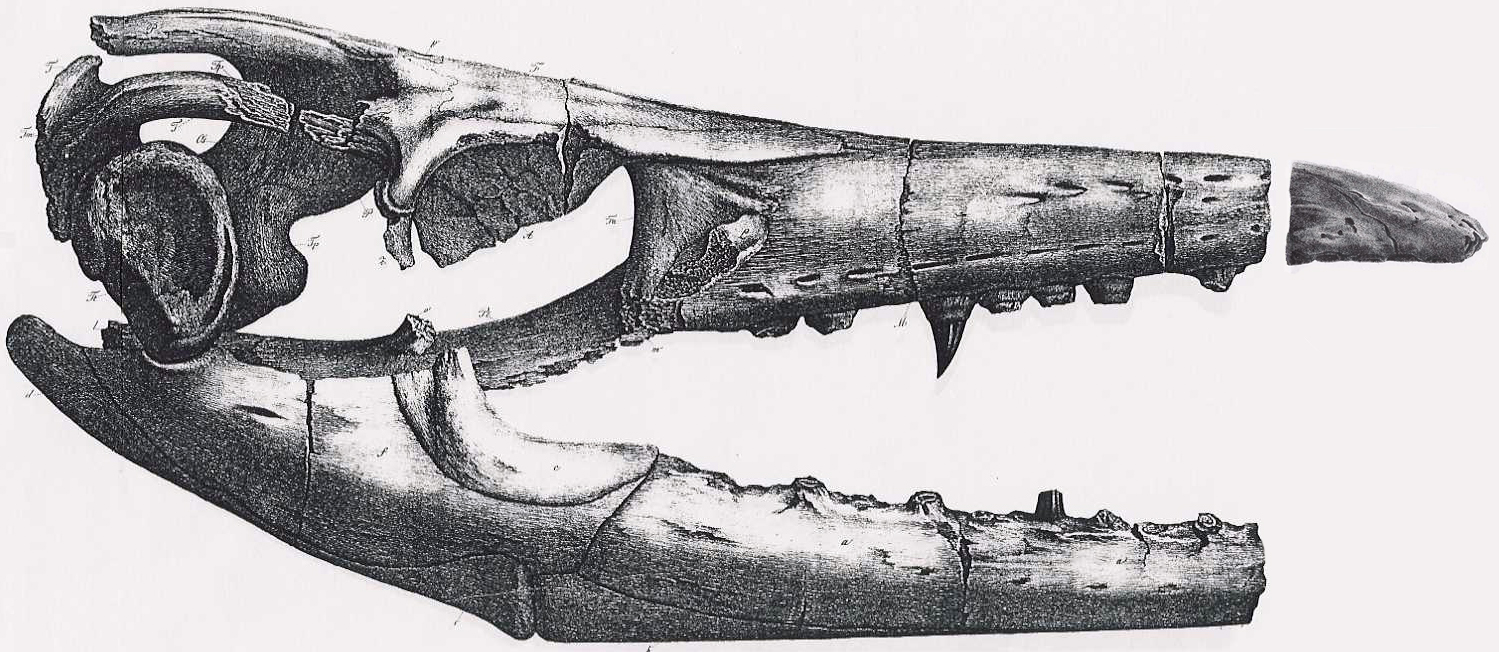
Skull of Mosasaurus missouriensis

==== 1830 ====
- Richard Harlan came into possession of the snout of O'Fallon's mosasaur, but mistook it for an ichthyosaur and described it at Ichthyosaurus missouriensis.

==== 1839 ====
- "Ichthyosaurus" missouriensis was "officially" reclassified as Mosasaurus missouriensis.

=== 1840s ===
==== 1845 ====
- August Goldfuss described the new species Mosasaurus maximiliani for the mosasaur, naming it after the Prince.

=== 1850s ===
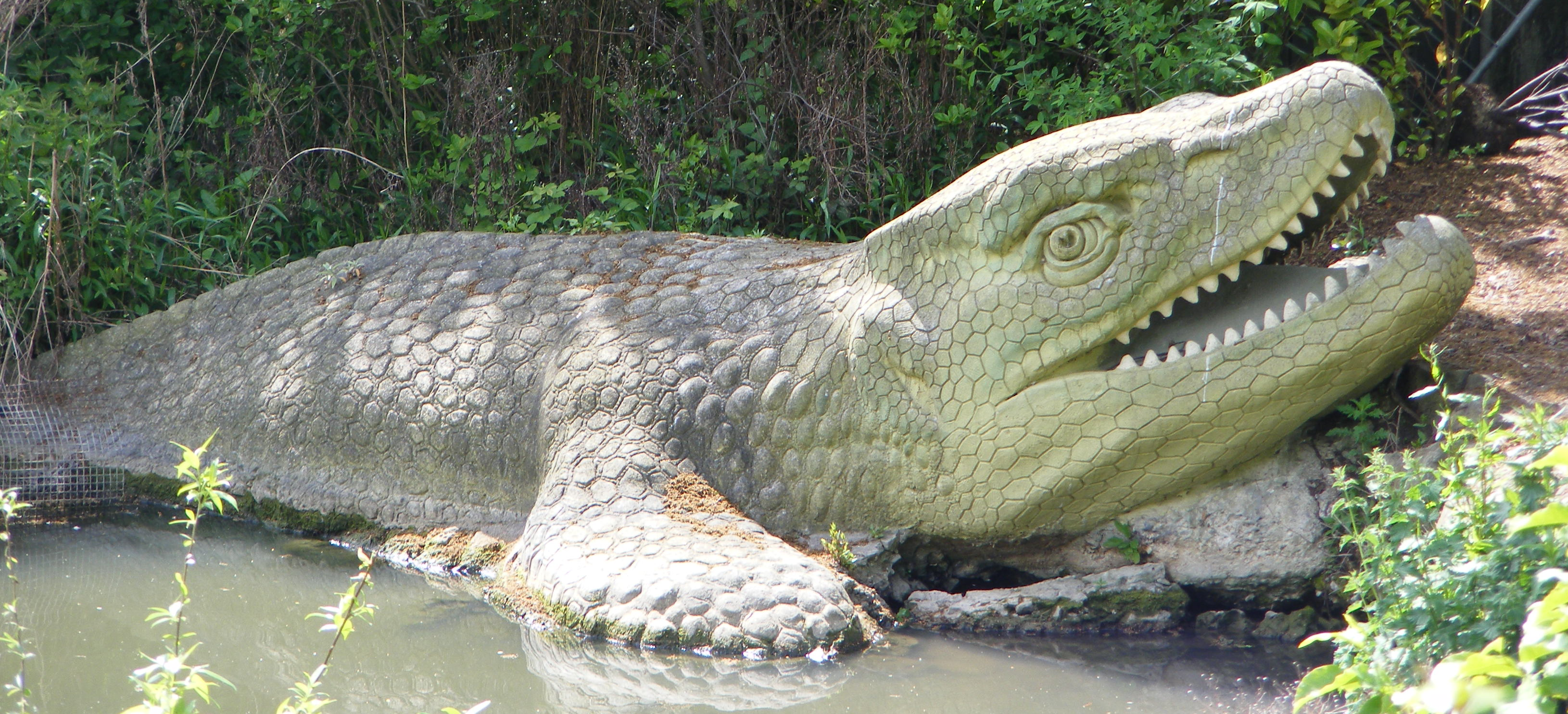
The Mosasaurus from the Crystal Palace

==== 1850 ====
- Robert Gibbes reported the presence of teeth and vertebrae now recognized as mosasaurian in origin from a limestone deposit in Alabama.

==== 1853 ====
- Paul Gervaius creates the family Mosasauridae. Originally included genera are Mosasaurus, Liodon, Onchosaurus (later recognised as a batoid fish), Oplosaurus (later recognised as a sauropod dinosaur), Macrosaurus (a historical wastebasket taxon) and Geosaurus (later recognised as a thalattosuchian).

=== 1860s ===
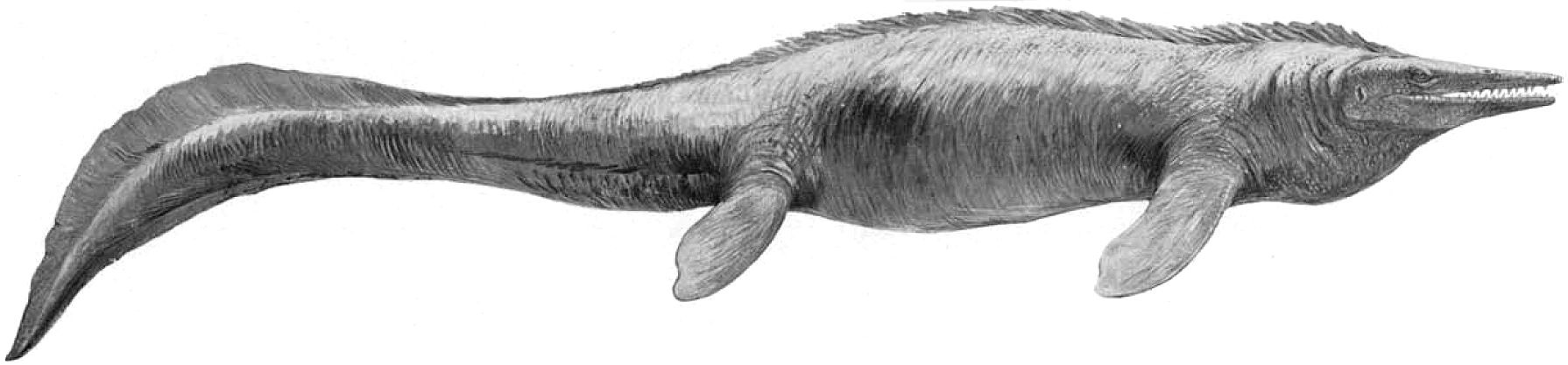
19th century life restoration of Tylosaurus

==== 1868 ====
- Edward Drinker Cope described a variety of new mosasaur taxa from Kansas, including species in the genera Clidastes, Liodon, Mosasaurus, and Platecarpus.

==== 1869 ====
- Cope described the species Macrosaurus proriger. This was the first mosasaur to be reported from Kansas.
- Cope erected the new order Pythonomorpha in which to classify the mosasaurs because of shared traits with modern snakes. He also described the new species Clidastes propython from Alabama.
- Othniel Charles Marsh described the species Halisaurus platyspondylus.

=== 1870s ===
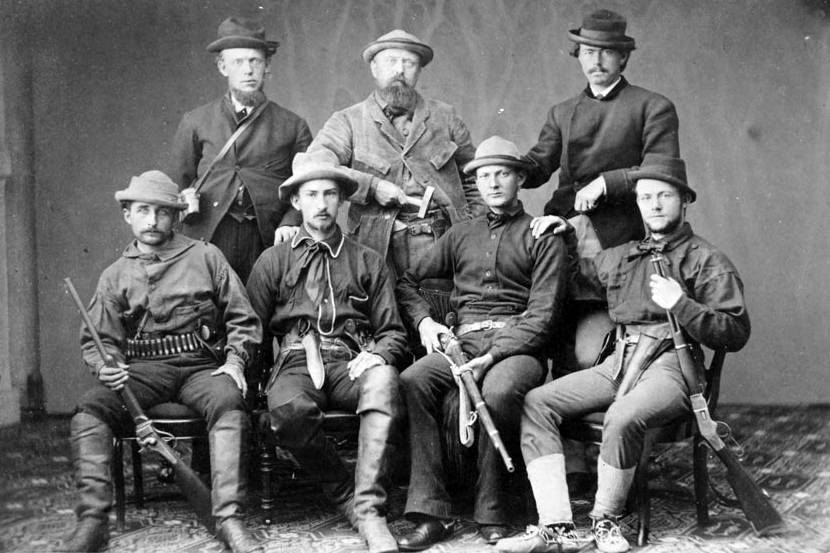
Photograph of O. C. Marsh's 1872 field crew

==== 1870 ====
- Marsh led an expedition into Kansas on behalf of Yale University.

November

- Marsh's crew discovered the first mosasaur specimen to preserve its hindlimbs in Kansas.

==== 1871 ====
- Marsh published a preliminary report about his fossil discoveries in Kansas.
- Betts published the first mention of a nearly complete Clidastes specimen discovered by Marsh's crew in Kansas.
- Marsh described his Kansan mosasaur discoveries in more detail, including the aforementioned Clidastes.

==== 1872 ====
- Marsh erroneously reported the presence of "dermal scutes" in mosasaurs.
- Marsh renamed Macrosaurus proriger Rhinosaurus proriger.
- Marsh renamed Rhinosaurus proriger Tylosaurus proriger.

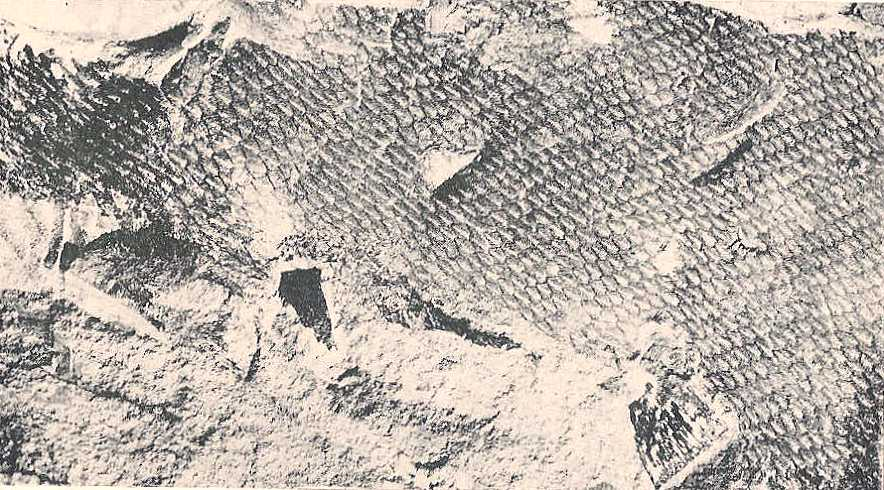
Fossil skin impression of Tylosaurus

==== 1874 ====
- Cope described the new species Clidastes planifrons and Tylosaurus nepaeolicus.

==== 1878 ====
- Francis H. Snow reported the first skin impressions of any mosasaur preserved with the Kansan Tylosaurus specimen KUVP 1075. The impressions revealed the presence and shape of its keeled, diamond-shaped scales.

=== 1880s ===
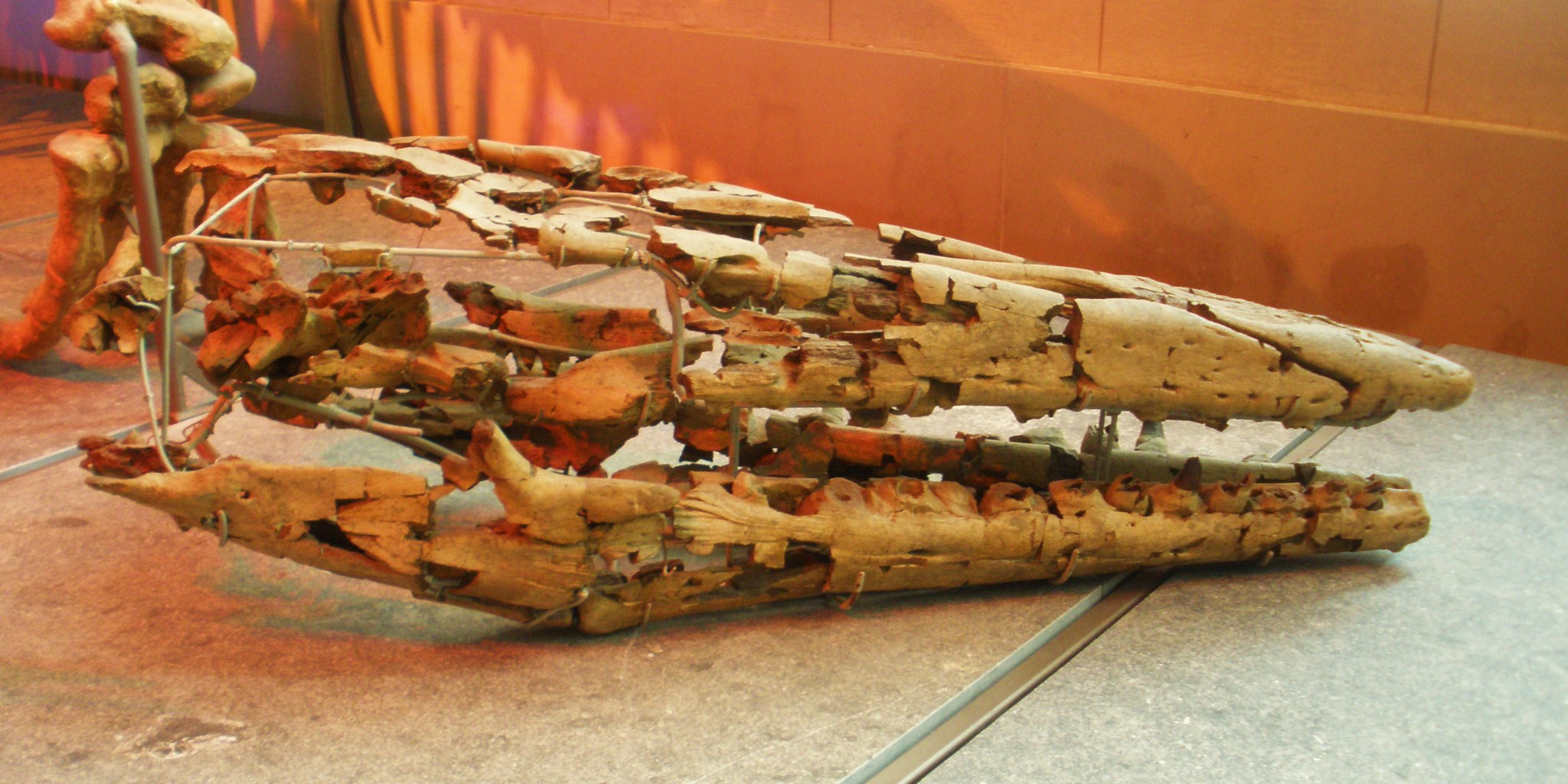
Skull of Hainosaurus bernardi

==== 1885 ====
- Louis Dollo described the new species Hainosaurus bernardi.

==== 1889 ====
- Dollo described the genus Phosphorosaurus.

=== 1890s ===
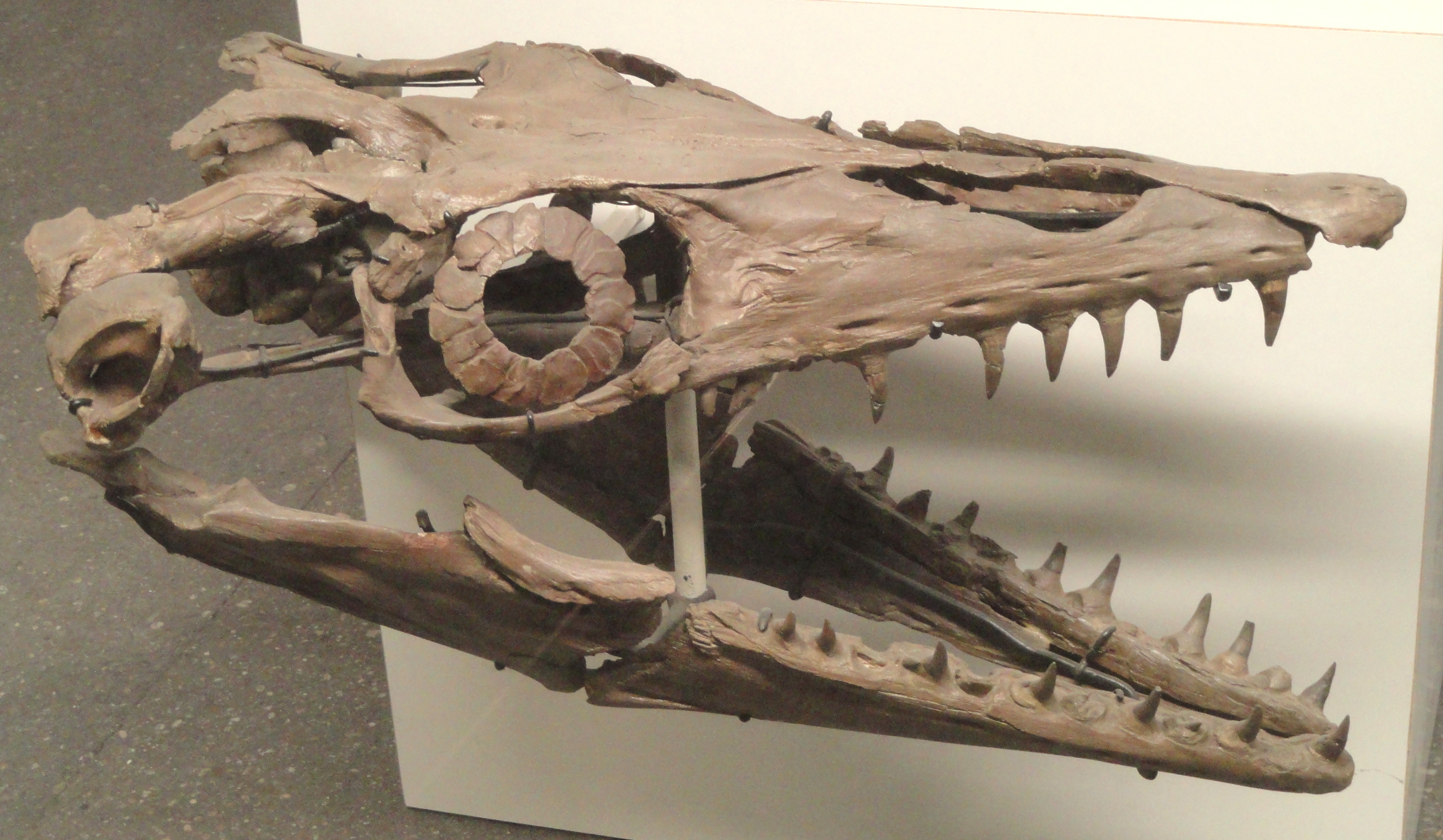
Skull of Platecarpus coryphaeus prominently exhibiting the scleral ring in its eye

==== 1891 ====
- Samuel Wendell Williston found that the supposed dermal scutes reported in mosasaurs by Marsh were actually scleral ring bones.

==== 1892 ====
- Georg Baur published a paper on mosasaurs.

==== 1894 ====
- John C. Merriam described the new species Platecarpus clidastoides.

==== 1895 ====
- Between 1880 and this date as many as 52 partial-to-complete Mosasaurus skeletons were found in the Ciply Phosphatic Chalk near Ciply, Belgium.

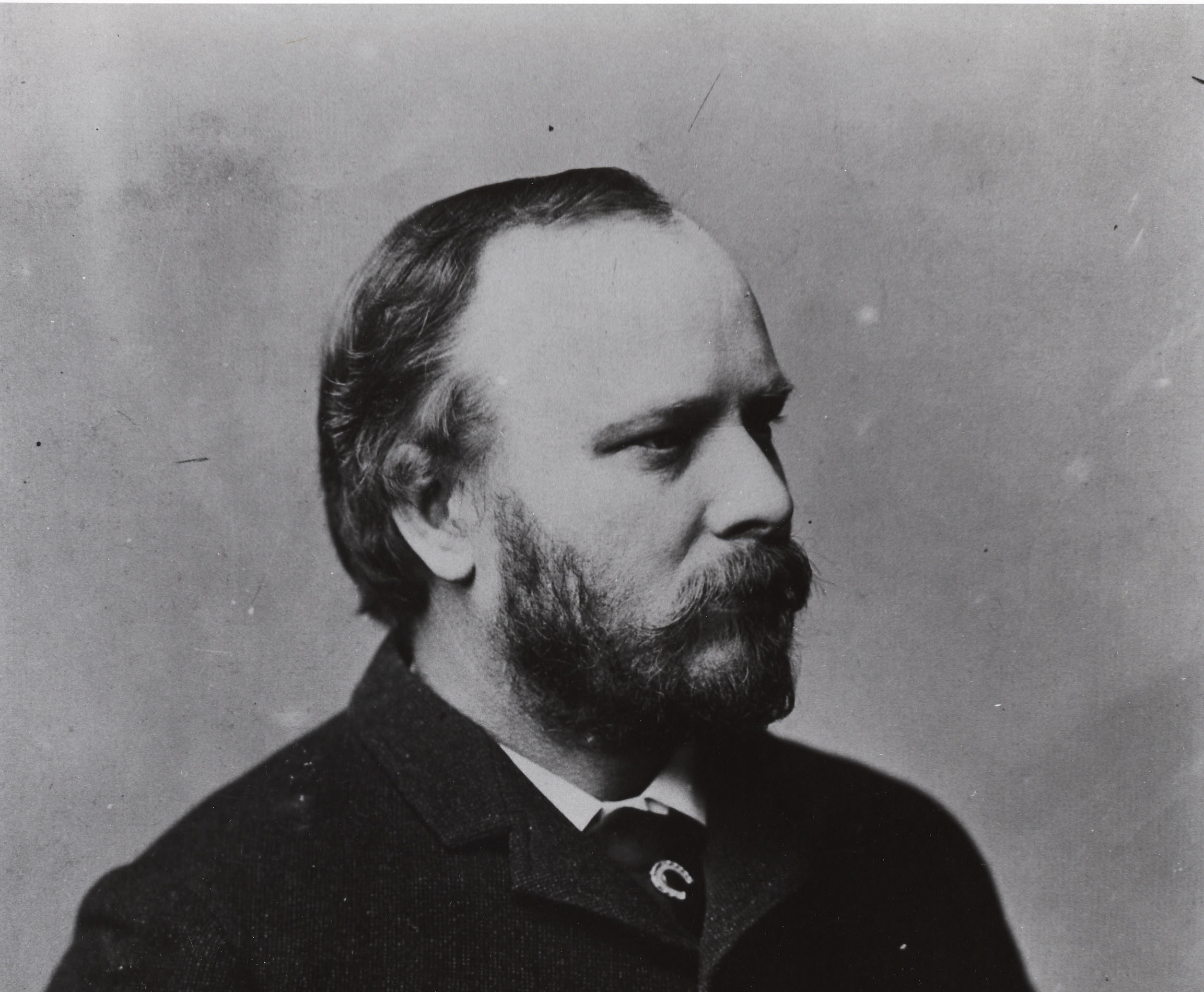
Portrait of Samuel Wendell Williston

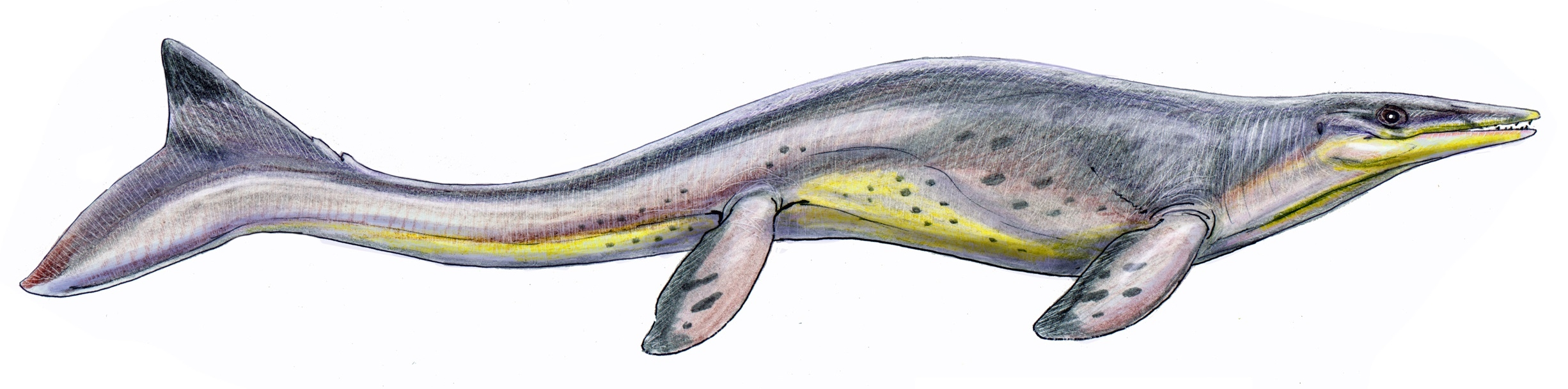
Life restoration of Tylosaurus proriger

==== 1897 ====
- Williston published notable early observations on mosasaur biostratigraphy. He reported the first known mosasaur fossils from the Pteranodon beds and the apparent absence of Clidastes from the Rudistes beds of the lower chalk.

==== 1898 ====
- Williston published a review of paleontology's understanding of mosasaurs. He bemoaned the taxonomic confusion caused by Cope and Marsh because their Bone War race for the honor of naming as many species as possible produced a large number of spurious taxa. Williston considered as many as four out of five named mosasaur species named at the time to be completely worthless. He noted that some of the differences used by Cope and Marsh to distinguish their putative mosasaur species resulted from distortion by geologic forces rather than biological variation. One notable taxonomic revision Williston made in this publication was his referral of Cope's 1874 species "Clidastes" planifrons to the genus Platecarpus.

Williston also discussed mosasaur life appearance and behavior. He compared mosasaur scales to those of monitor lizards and misinterpreted some fossilized cartilage as evidence for a fringe of soft tissue down mosasaurs' backs. He hypothesized that mosasaurs left the safety of the water to lay eggs on land. The paleobiology of individual mosasaur taxa also received Williston's attention. He thought the genus Clidastes as an inhabitant of near-surface waters. In contrast, Williston interpreted Platecarpus as a "deep diver" and thought Tylosaurus fed primarily on other marine reptiles.

He also elaborated on his earlier research into mosasaur biostratigraphy. He observed that Tylosaurus ranged throughout the Smoky Hill Chalk but went extinct around the time the Fort Pierre Shale was deposited. Platecarpus was also only known from the Niobrara Formation. Clidastes was only known from the upper Niobrara.

- Henry Fairfield Osborn recognized fossilized cartilage in a Tylosaurus specimen as the remains of tracheal rings.
- Williston first reported the mosasaur specimen now catalogued as KUVP 1001 and classified in the species Platecarpus tympaniticus to the scientific literature.

==== 1899 ====
- Osborn reported the first evidence for a bend in the mosasaur tail in Tylosaurus proriger.

== 20th century ==
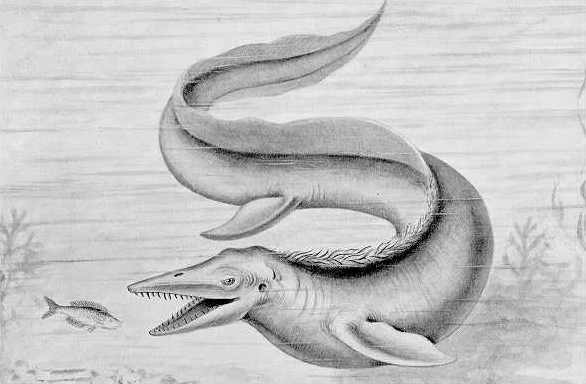
Outdated life restoration of Mosasaurus with a dorsal fringe

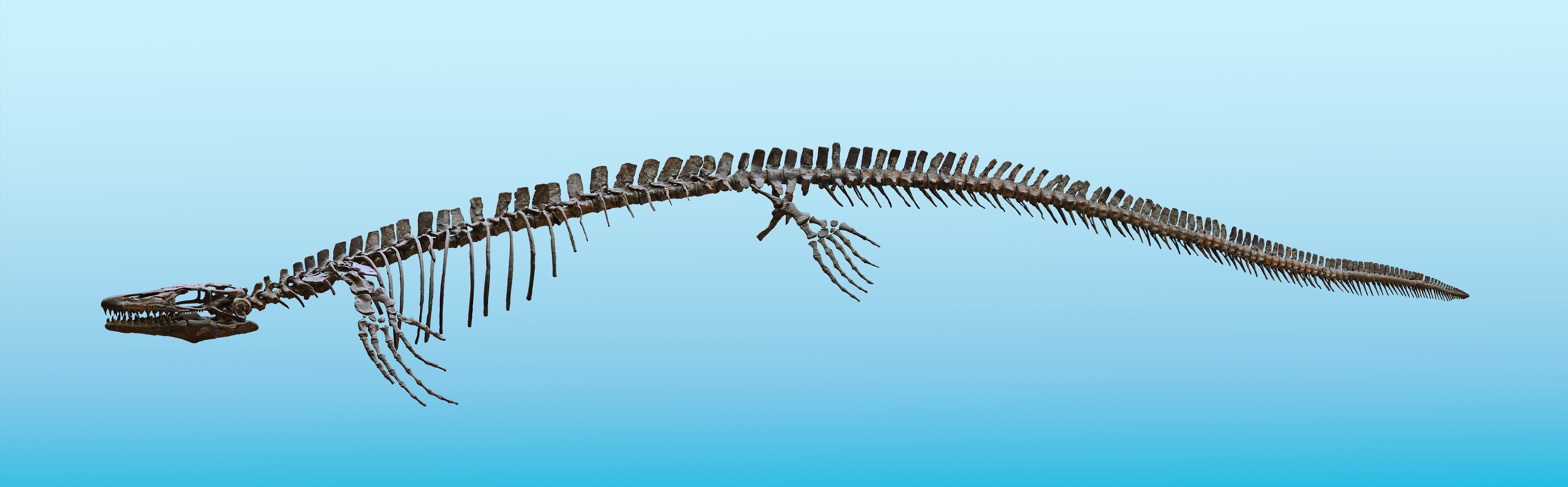
Skeletal mount of Plioplatecarpus

=== 1900s ===
==== 1902 ====
- Williston publicly acknowledged that the supposed fringe running down the back of a mosasaur he had reported was actually misidentified tracheal rings.

==== 1904 ====
- Dollo reported the presence of the remains of a large turtle preserved in the stomach of Hainosaurus.

==== 1905 ====
- Fossil hunters Dennis Halvorson and Mike Hanson discovered the largest known specimen of Plioplatecarpus in the Pierre Shale of North Dakota. The skeleton was about 70% complete.

==== 1907 ====
- The excavation of the North Dakota Plioplatecarpus specimen concluded.

=== 1910s ===
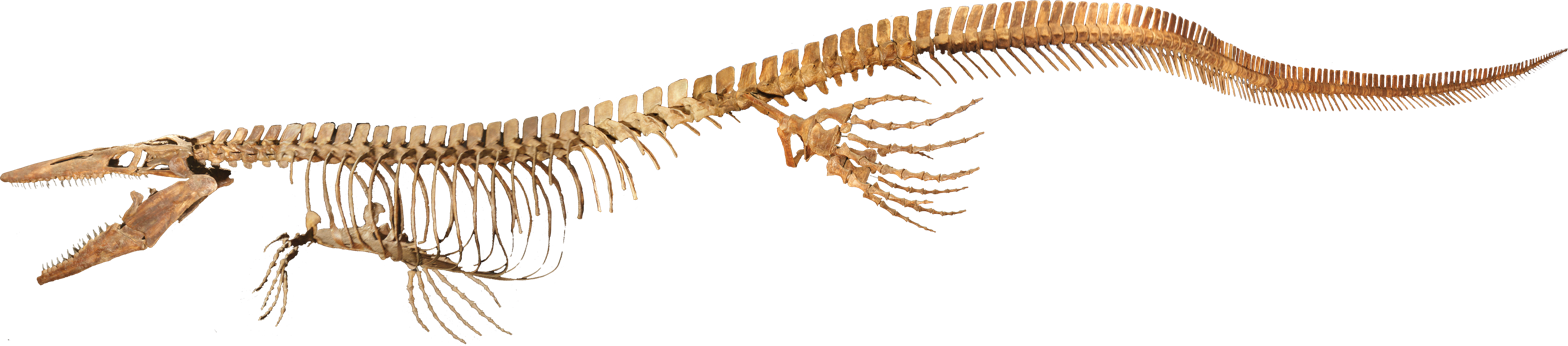
The "Bunker" Tylosaurus skeleton

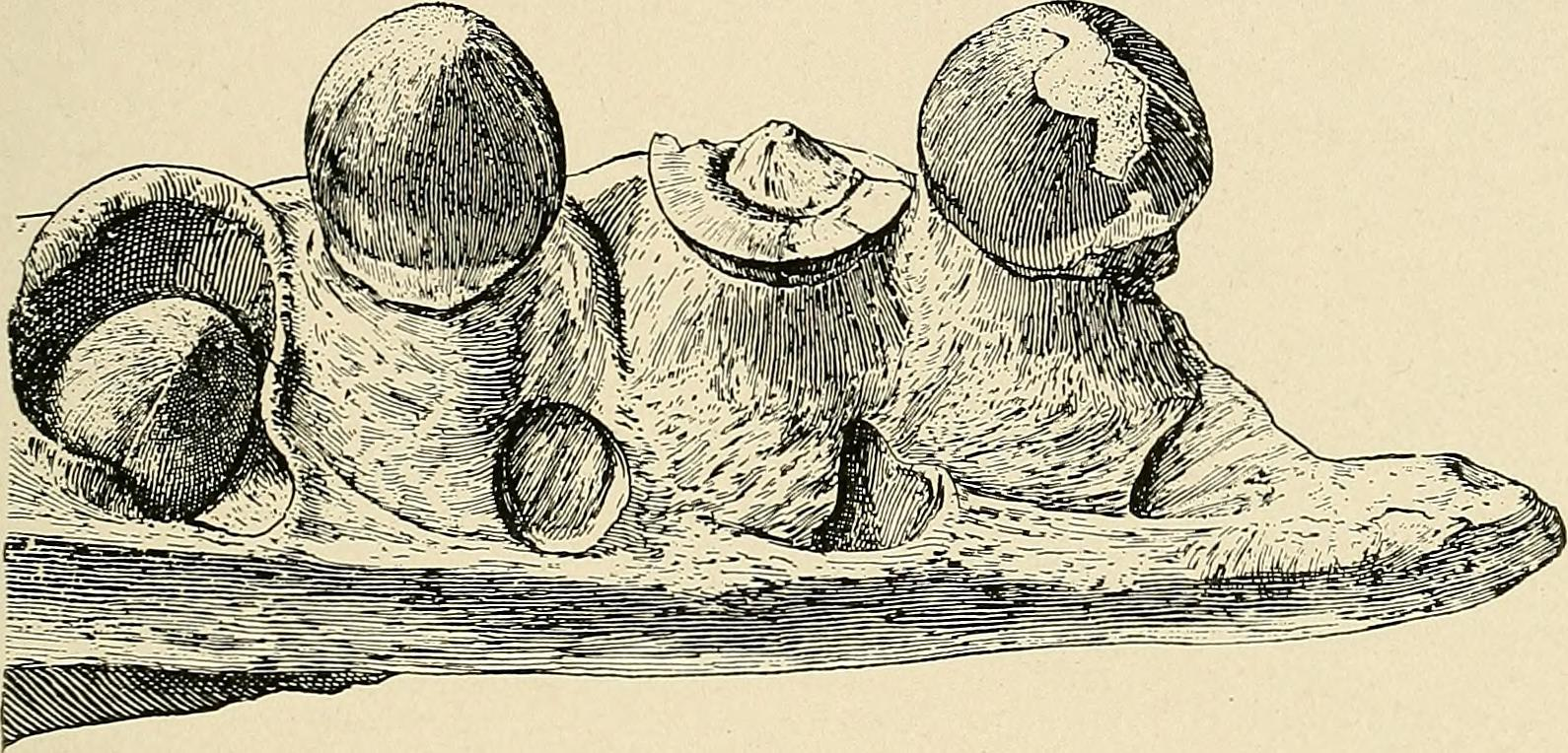
Jaw and teeth of Globidens

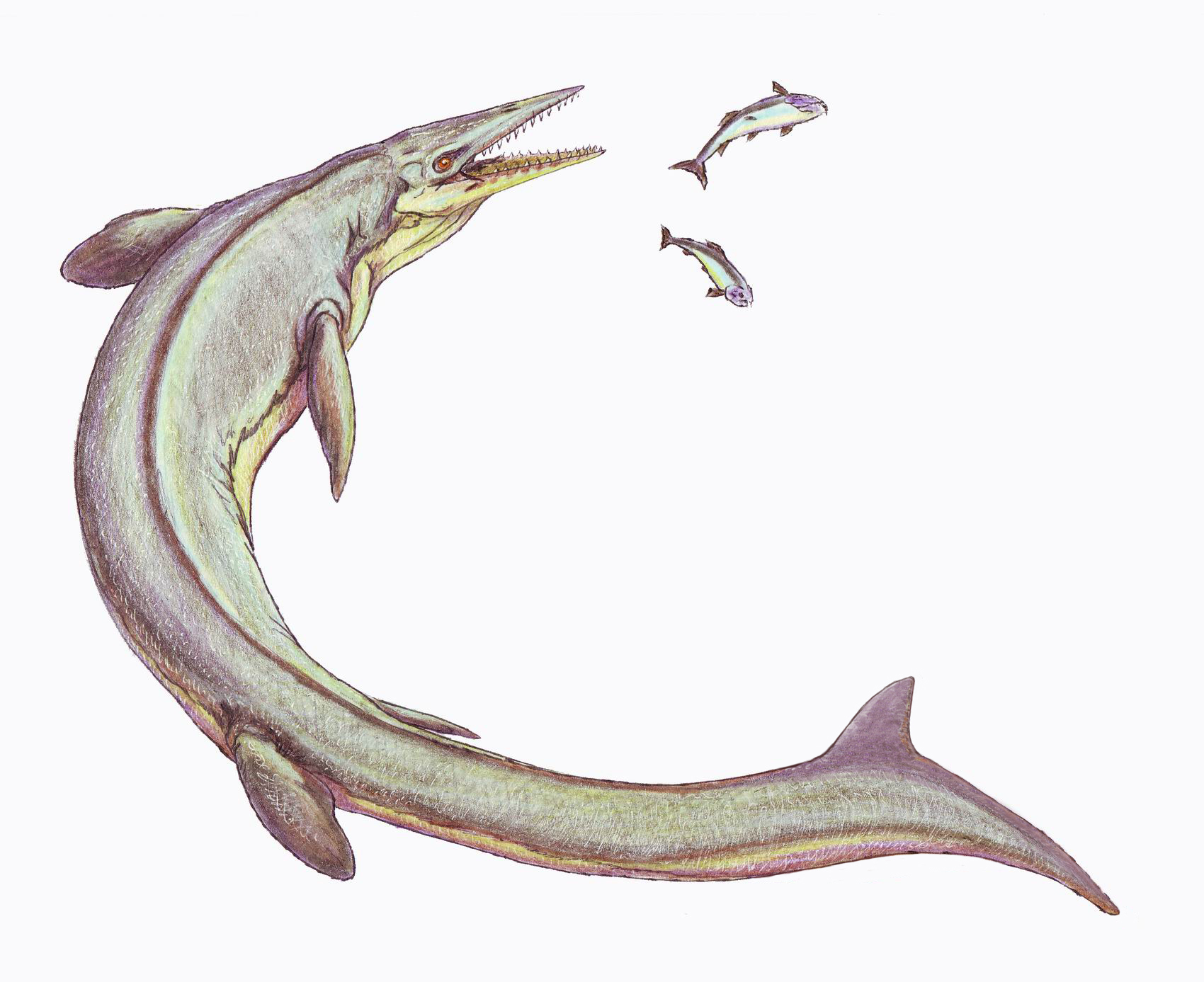
Life restoration of Clidastes

==== 1911 ====
- The "Bunker" Tylosaurus specimen was discovered in Kansas. At almost 45 feet in length it was one of the largest specimens ever classified in the genus and is the largest mosasaur skeleton in the United States to have been mounted for a museum exhibit, which is on display at the University of Kansas museum.

==== 1912 ====
- Charles Whitney Gilmore described the new genus and species Globidens alabamaensis. This unusual mosasaur had rounded teeth specialized for cracking shell and probably fed on the abundant ammonites of the Cretaceous seas.
- Robert Broom described a new Tylosaurus species, T. capensis from Pondoland, South Africa.

==== 1914 ====
- Williston interpreted the mosasaur Clidastes as inhabiting the waters near the surface of its marine home.

==== 1917 ====
- Charles Sternberg discovered a skeleton left behind by a 25 foot long Tylosaurus in Kansas with preserved skin. He observed that the skin was "covered with small, overlapping scales".

==== 1918 ====
- Charles and Levi Sternberg excavated a Platecarpus and a Clidastes sternbergii specimen in Kansas, which were sold to the Paleontological Museum in Uppsala, Sweden.
- A Tylosaurus specimen was discovered in Logan County, Kansas.

=== 1920s ===
==== 1920 ====
- Carl Wiman described the new species Clidastes sternbergii. He noticed evidence for tail bends in the species Halisaurus sternbergi and Platecarpus tympaniticus. He compared them to the tail bend in ichthyosaurs that support their tail flukes. In one figure, he restored the mosasaur's tail with an upper lobe like ichthyosaurs have. This prescient observation would be confirmed in the early 21st century.

==== 1922 ====
- Sternberg reported the remains of a young polycotylid plesiosaur preserved in the remains of the 1918 Logan County Tylosaurus specimen.

=== 1930s ===
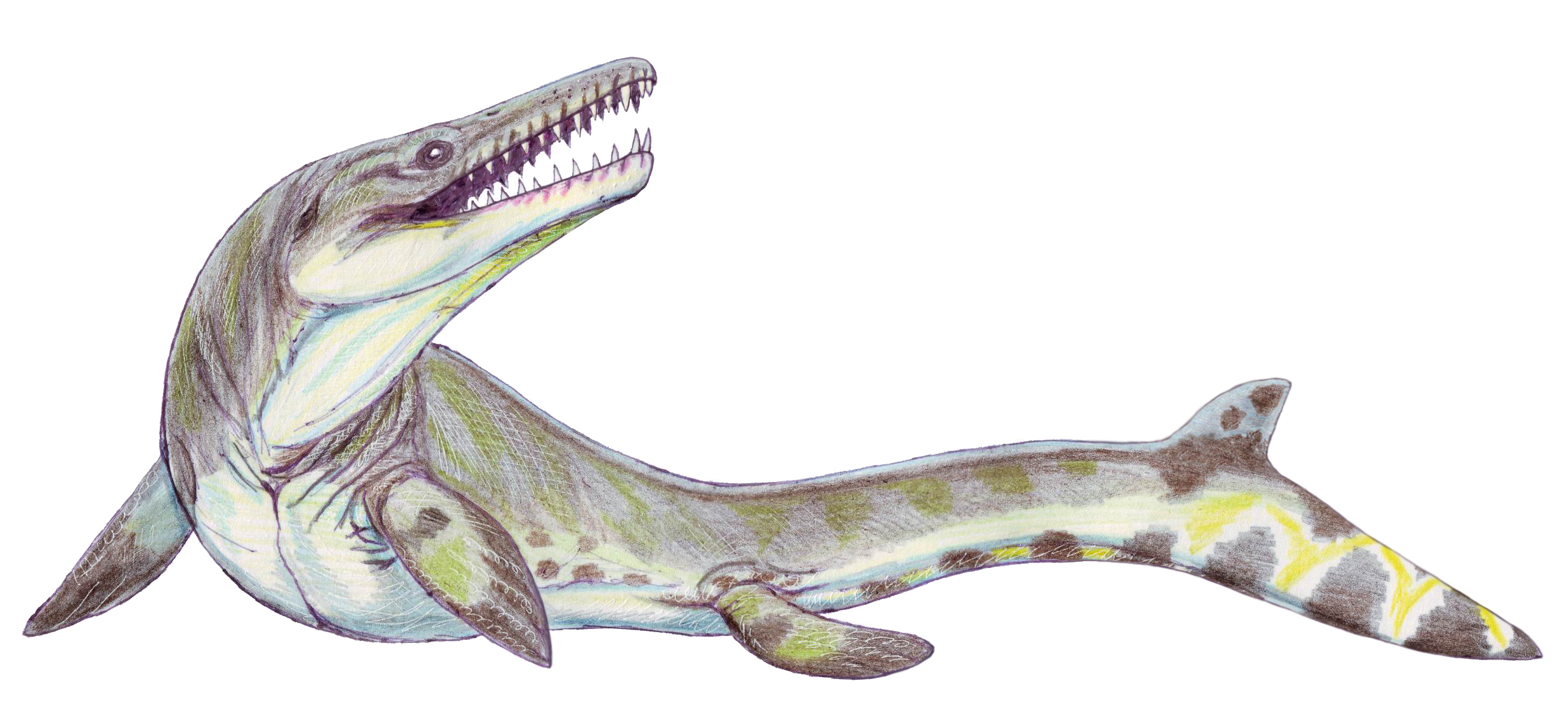
Life restoration of Goronyosaurus

==== 1930 ====
- W. E. Swinton described the new species Mosasaurus nigeriensis from Nigeria.

==== 1935 ====
- Otto Zdansky reported that eight species of mosasaurs had been discovered in Egypt and ten species were known from Africa overall.

==== 1937 ====
- A high school student named Allan Bennison discovered the future type specimen of Plotosaurus bennisoni in Moreno Formation rocks of the San Joaquin Valley in California.
- Another major mosasaur discovery occurred in California when a rancher named Frank Paiva and a Fresno State College professor named William M. Tucker discovered the future type specimen of Plotosaurus tuckeri.

==== 1939 ====
- Robert Leard discovered the future type specimen of Plesiotylosaurus crassidens in Moreno Formation rocks of the Panoche Hills in California.

=== 1940s ===
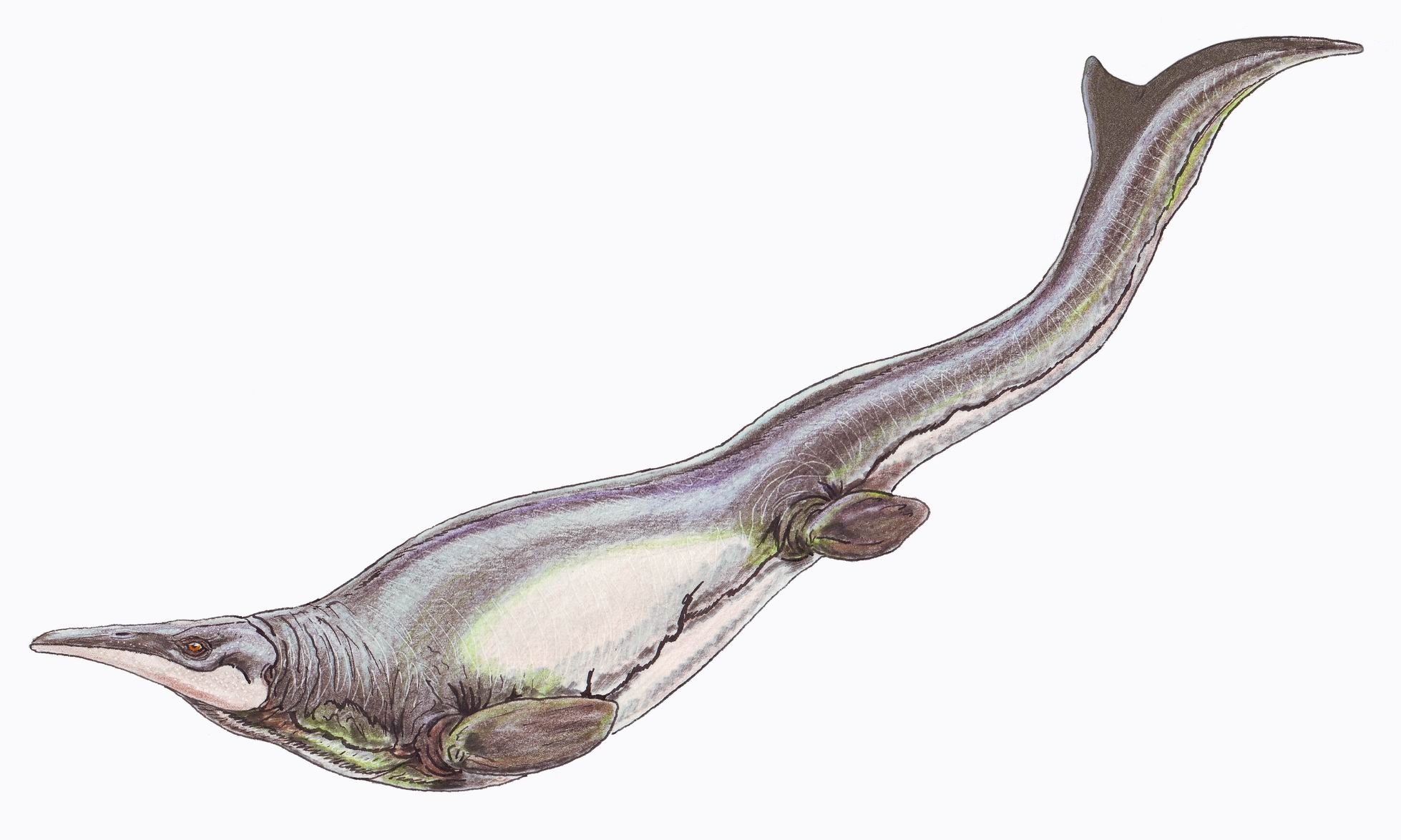
Life restoration of Plotosaurus

==== 1942 ====
- Charles Camp described the new genera Kolposaurus and Plesiotylosaurus, although the genus Kolposaurus had already been used for a different kind of animal and Camp would later rename the mosasaur Plotosaurus. Along with describing the genus itself, Camp named two "Kolposaurus", "K." bennisoni and "K." tuckeri. At least one specimen of these species was found to have fish preserved in its stomach. Camp observed that Plotosaurus was a very evolutionarily advanced mosasaur with an especially stiff torso and powerful tail. Plesiotylosaurus Camp found to be very similar to the original Tylosaurus.
- George Gaylord Simpson reported that the possible mosasaur fossils discovered by the Lewis and Clark expedition had been lost.

==== 1945 ====
- Rainer Zangerl of the Chicago Field Museum led an expedition to collect fossils from the Selma Formation of Alabama and acquired several mosasaur specimens.

=== 1950s ===
==== 1951 ====
- Camp renamed the mosasaur genus Kolposaurus to Plotosaurus because the former name had been used previously for a nothosaur.

=== 1960s ===
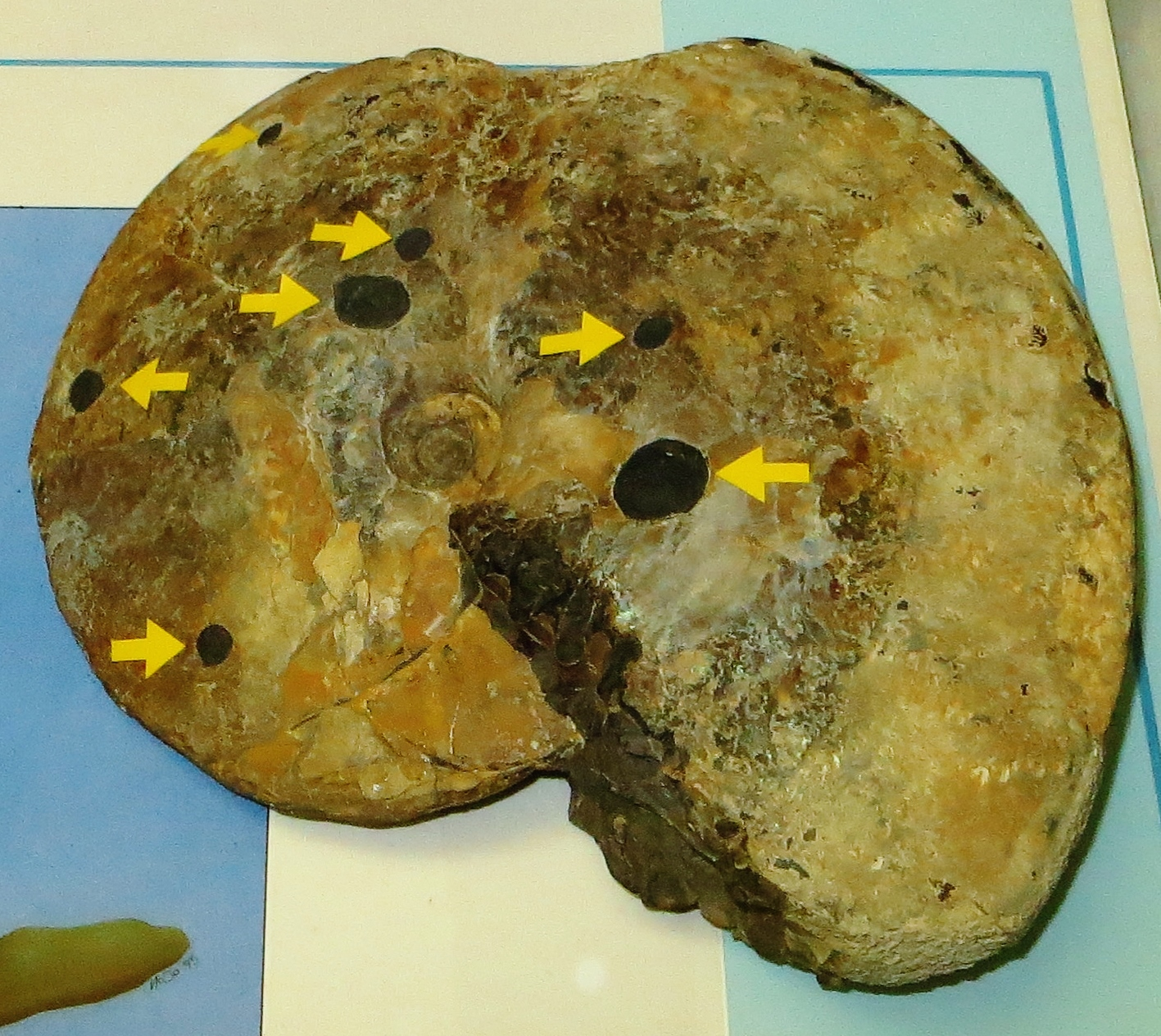
Fossil shell of the ammonoid Placenticeras, showing putative mosasaur toothmarks

==== 1960 ====
- Erle Kauffman and Robert Kesling reported a fossil ammonite of the genus Placenticeras exhibiting damage they interpreted as tooth marks from a mosasaur, probably a platecarpine.

==== 1963 ====
- George Sternberg discovered a mostly complete mosasaur specimen with skin impressions near WaKeeney, Kansas. The specimen is now recognized as the best preserved specimen of the genus Ectenosaurus.

==== 1967 ====
Dale Russell published a monograph on American mosasaurs. This monograph contained significant taxonomic revisions for the family. Among these were his conclusion that Platecarpus coryphaeus and Platecarpus ictericus were likely junior synonyms of P. tympaniticus while P. planfirons was too poorly preserved to be classified confidently at all. Russell also dismissed the species Tylosaurus dyspelor described by Cope as a dubious probable-synonym of Tylosaurus proriger.

Russell also published additional information and speculation on mosasaur biostratigraphy. He reported the presence of mosasaur vertebrae up to 90 million years old among the Turonian fossils curated by the University of Kansas Museum of Natural History. Another of this work's significant contributions to mosasaur biostratigraphy concerned the mosasaurs of the Smoky Hill Chalk. Russell devised two biostratigraphic zones based on the Chalk's mosasaur fossils. The lower zone was characterized by Clidastes liodontus, Platecarpus coryphaeus, and Tylosaurus nepaeolicus. The upper was home to Clidastes, Platecarpus ictericus, and Tylosaurus proriger. He regarded Platecarpus and Tylosaurus as deep water animals but concluded that the biostratigraphic evidence from the Smoky Hill mosasaurs suggested that the Chalk's depositional environment was becoming shallower and nearer to the ancient coastline over time. Russell also argued that by the end of the Late Cretaceous, mosasaurs were converging on the body plan that characterized the first ichthyosaurs during the Triassic period and gradually replacing these older marine reptiles.

==== 1969 ====
- A University of Florence team embarked on a fossil hunting expedition to Nigeria. This expedition would discover a large quantity of mosasaur fossils in the Dukamaje Formation.

=== 1970s ===
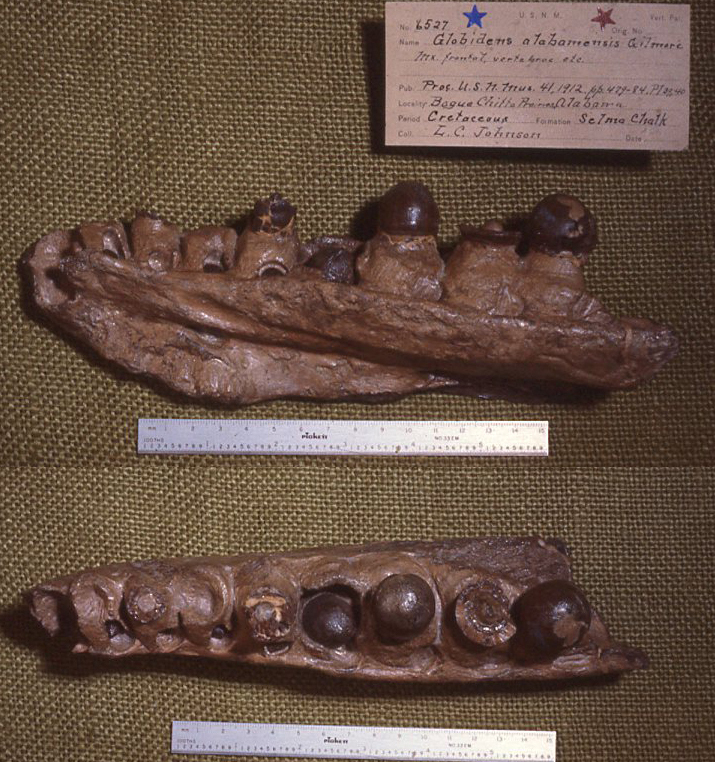
Holotype jaws and teeth of the species Globidens alabamaensis from the Selma Group of Alabama

==== 1970 ====
- Russell published a paper on the mosasaurs of the Selma Formation, including those collected by the Zangerl expedition in 1945. The paper contained several taxonomic advances including the description of the new species Tylosaurus zangerli and the reclassification of "Clidastes" sternbergii in the genus Halisaurus. Russell considered the Mosasaurus species M. lemonnieri and M. conodon to be synonyms. Overall he concluded that the known mosasaurs of the Selma Formation were Clidastes propython, Halisaurus sternbergi, Globidens alabamaensis, Platecarpus, Prognathodon, and T. zangerli. He noted that the biostratigraphic distribution of mosasaurs in the Selma Formation were different than the mosasaurs of the Smoky Hill Chalk.
- The University of Florence team continued searching for mosasaur fossils in Nigeria.

==== 1972 ====
- Azzaroli and others erected the new genus Goronyosaurus for the species "Mosasaurus" nigeriensis.

==== 1975 ====
- Russell claimed that unlike all other mosasaurs, Globidens dakotensis didn't have teeth on its pterygoid, although this claim has been subsequently dismissed.

==== 1977 ====
- Martin and Stewart argued that some fossils discovered in Cenomanian rocks in Kansas represented the oldest known mosasaur fossils.

=== 1980s ===
==== 1980 ====
- Joan Wiffen described the new genus Moanasaurus.

==== 1982 ====
- Sankar Chatterjee and Zinsmeister reported the discovery of mosasaur fossils from islands off the coast of Antarctica.

==== 1985 ====
- Suzuki described the new species Mosasaurus hobetsuensis.

==== 1986 ====
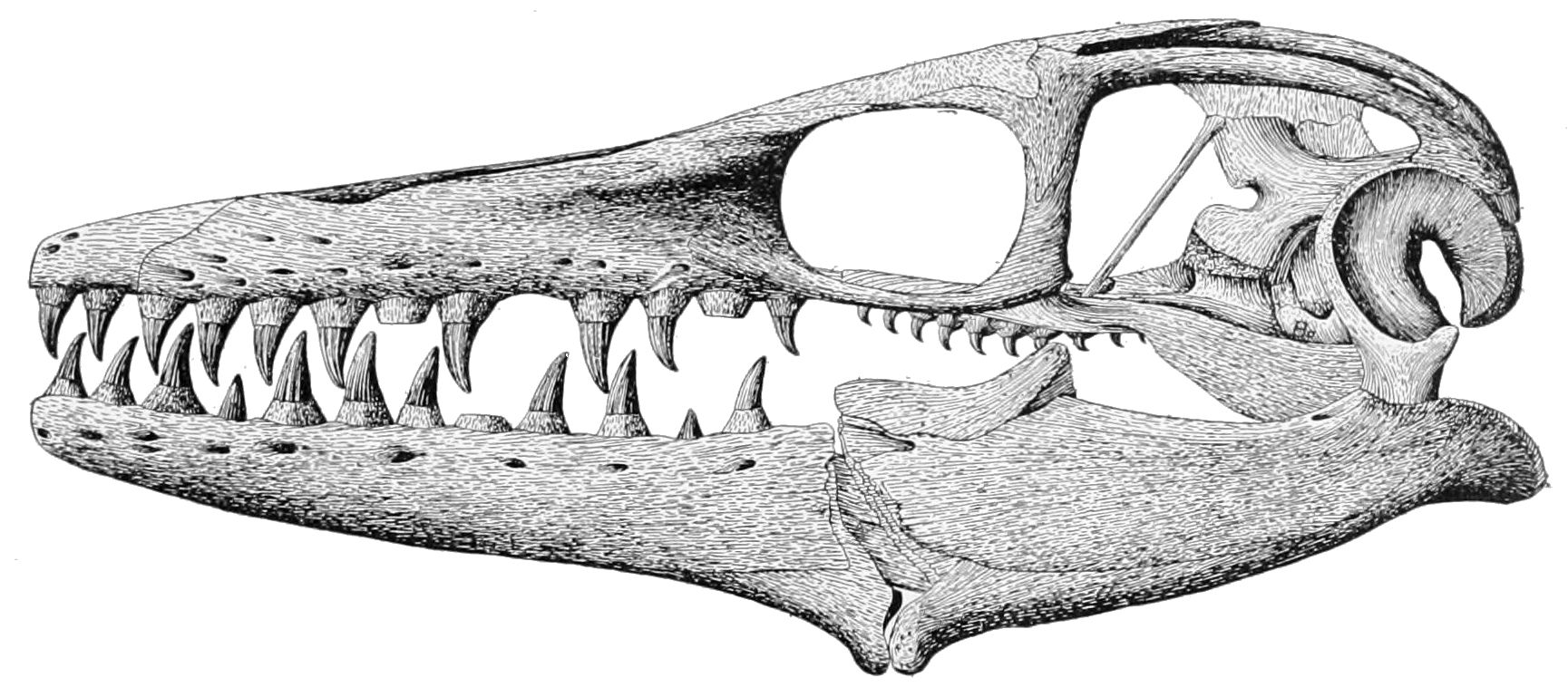
Skull of Platecarpus

- Bell and SHeldon reported the discovery of subadult mosasaur fossils.

==== 1987 ====
- Judy Massare studied the anatomy of mosasaur teeth and its implication for their diet. She argued that the "slender", recurved teeth of Platecarpus were adapted to feeding on relatively small, soft prey like squid.
- James Martin and Phillip Bork reported the fossilized stomach contents of a Tylosaurus proriger skeleton discovered in South Dakota: a bony fish in the genus Bananogmius, Hesperornis, a lamnid shark, and Clidastes.

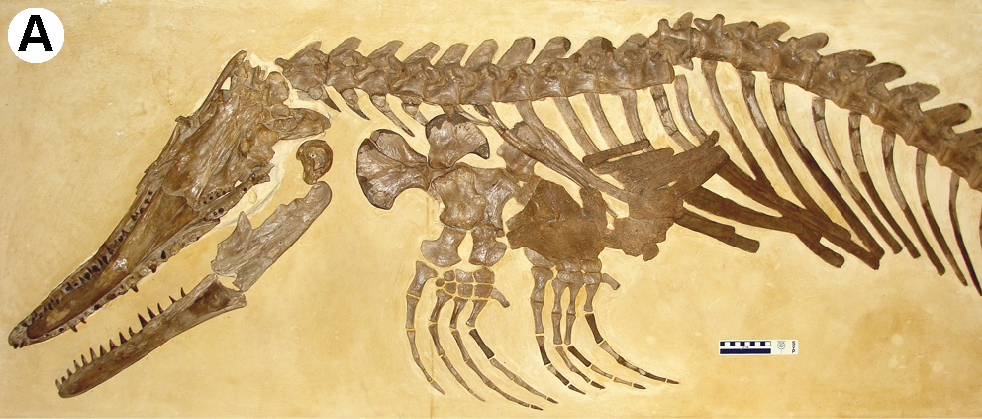
Fossils of Ectenosaurus

- Rothschild and Martin looked for evidence that mosasaurs suffered from the bends as a result of their diving and ascent activities. Avascular necrosis resulting from the bends was completely absent in fossils of the genus Clidastes, suggesting that it preferred to stay near the surface. In contrast, Rothschild and Martin observed avascular necrosis in nearly every specimen of Platecarpus and Tylosaurus that they surveyed. The presence and ubiquity of the avascular necrosis is consistent with the idea that these were deep diving animals.
- Russell described the new genus Ectenosaurus for the species "Platecarpus" clidastoides.

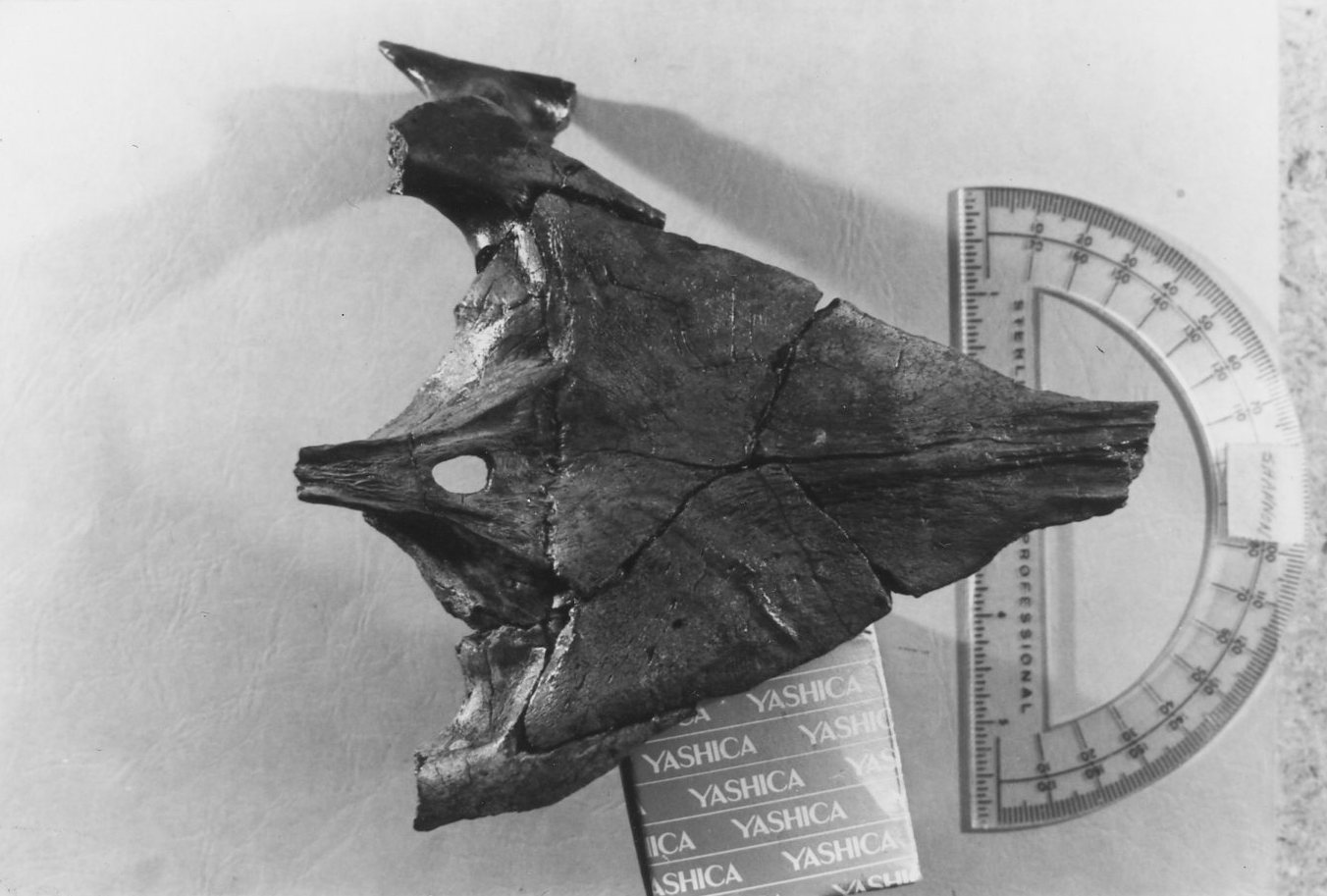
Type specimen of Selmasaurus russelli

==== 1988 ====
- Kenneth Wright and Samuel Shannon described the new genus and species Selmasaurus russelli from the Mooreville Chalk near Selma, Alabama.
- Lingham-Soliar reexamined Goronyosaurus from Nigeria.
- Betsy Nicholls described a new species of Hainosaurus, H. pembinensis, from a Pembina Mining Company mine in the Pierre Shale of Manitoba, Canada.
- Massare concluded that mosasaurs were slow swimmers that had to hunt by ambushing prey rather than chasing it down directly.
- Stewart disputed Russell's 1967 mosasaur-based biostragraphic scheme for the Smoky Hill Chalk because he had observed fossils preserved outside of their purported "zones".

==== 1989 ====
- Martin and Rothschild interpreted Clidastes as an inhabitant of shallow waters, while Tylosaurus may have been the Cretaceous paleoecological equivalent to a sperm whale, diving deep in the Western Interior Seaway to hunt the giant squid that lived there.
- Russell suggested that mosasaurs may have reproduced by laying eggs on remote island beaches.

=== 1990s ===
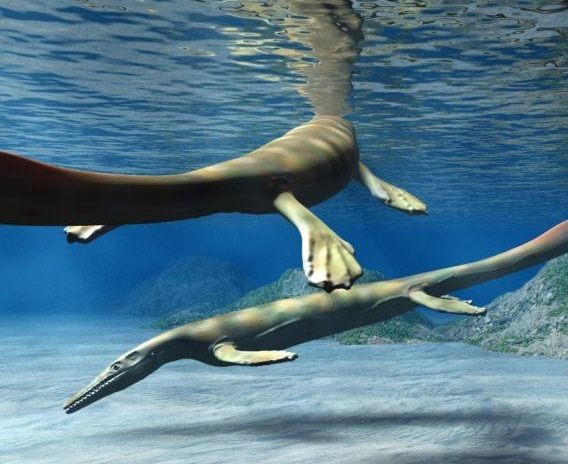
Life restoration of Eonatator

==== 1990 ====
- Wiffen described the new genus Rikkisaurus.
- Michael Everhart discovered two Platecarpus skulls that had been "co-mingled and partially digested".
- Stewart used a recently proposed biostratigraphic scheme for the Smoky Hill Chalk to propose stratigraphic ranges for its mosasaur taxa.

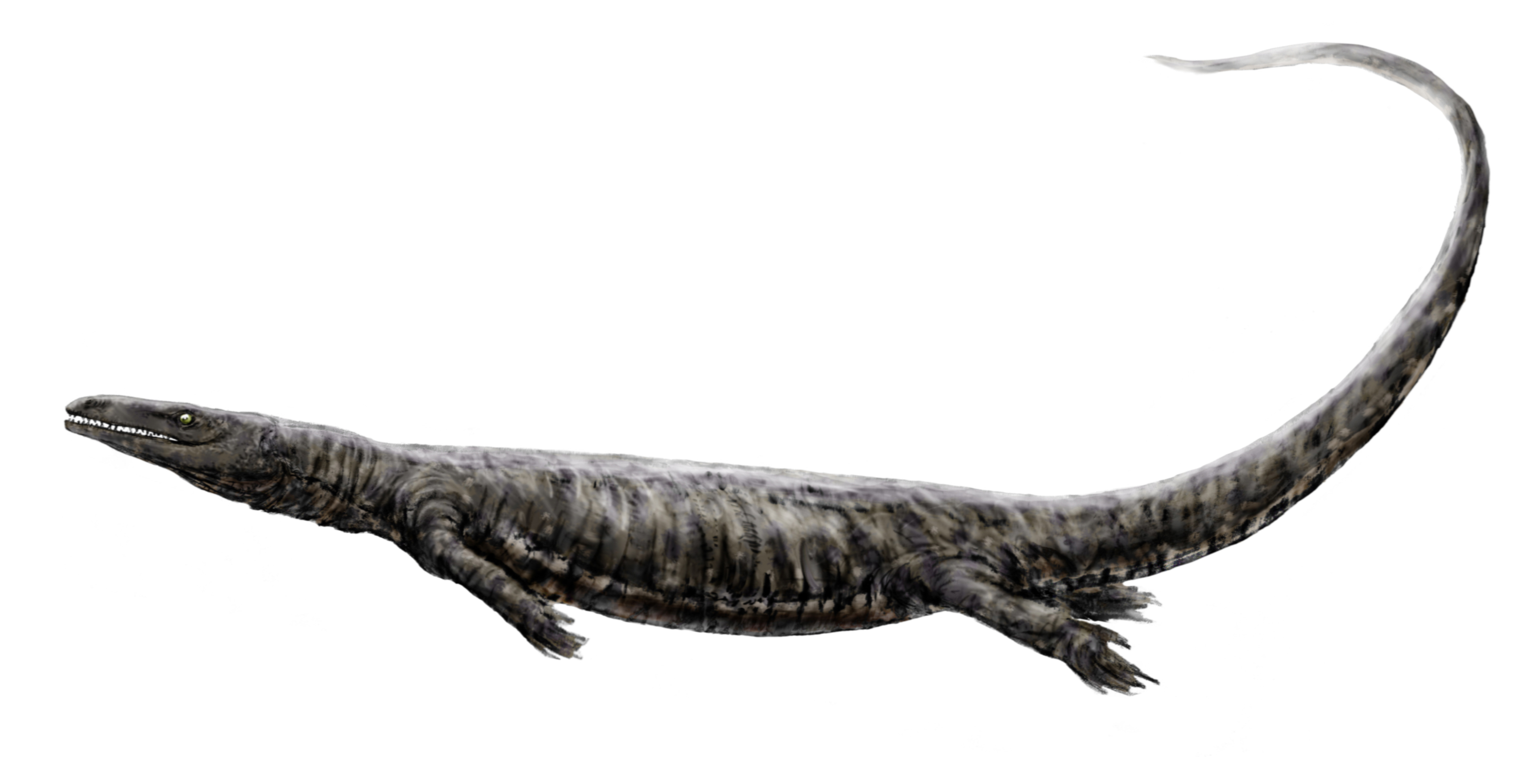
Life restoration of Opetiosaurus.

==== 1991 ====
- Lingham-Soliar rejected the idea that "Halisaurus" sternbergi belonged to the genus. However, he thought that the genus Phosphorosaurus should be sunk in that genus. He also dismissed the supposed Mosasaurus species M. nigeriensis as a chimera of multiple mosasaur species.
- Lingham-Soliar attempted to reconstruct how mosasaurs swam by studying their vertebral column. He found that the front part of column was stiffened and only the rear portion flexed during swimming. This more similar to the way a modern Alligator swims rather than snakes, which many previous researchers had put forth as mosasaur analogs.

==== 1992 ====
- Robert Carroll and Michael DeBraga published a discussion about aigialosaurs and their evolutionary affinities. They noted that aigialosaur skulls are virtually indistinguishable from those of primitive mosasaurs. However they found the vertebrae in their back and their limb bones to more closely resemble those belonging to the precursors of living monitor lizards.
- Lingham-Soliar regarded the question of how the Hainosaurus reported in 1904 by Dollo to contain a turtle in its stomach could have swallowed a prey item of that size as mysterious.
- Lingham-Soliar hypothesized that Plioplatecarpus marshi "flew" underwater primarily using its powerful fore-flippers rather than using its tail like other mosasaurs due to P. marshi's well-developed shoulder region. He argued that this unusual style of swimming increased its maneuverability, allowing this species to flourish in shallow habitats.
- Nathalie Bardet published a discussion of the possible causes for the extinction of the ichthyosaurs. She expressed doubt that ichthyosaurs were replaced by mosasaurs because they would not be in direct competition with each other. Instead she posited a connection to an extinction event that affected cephalopods at the boundary between the Cenomanian and Turonian ages. She proposed that the disappearance of these many cephalopod species may have deprived ichthyosaurs of their food source and caused their extinction.

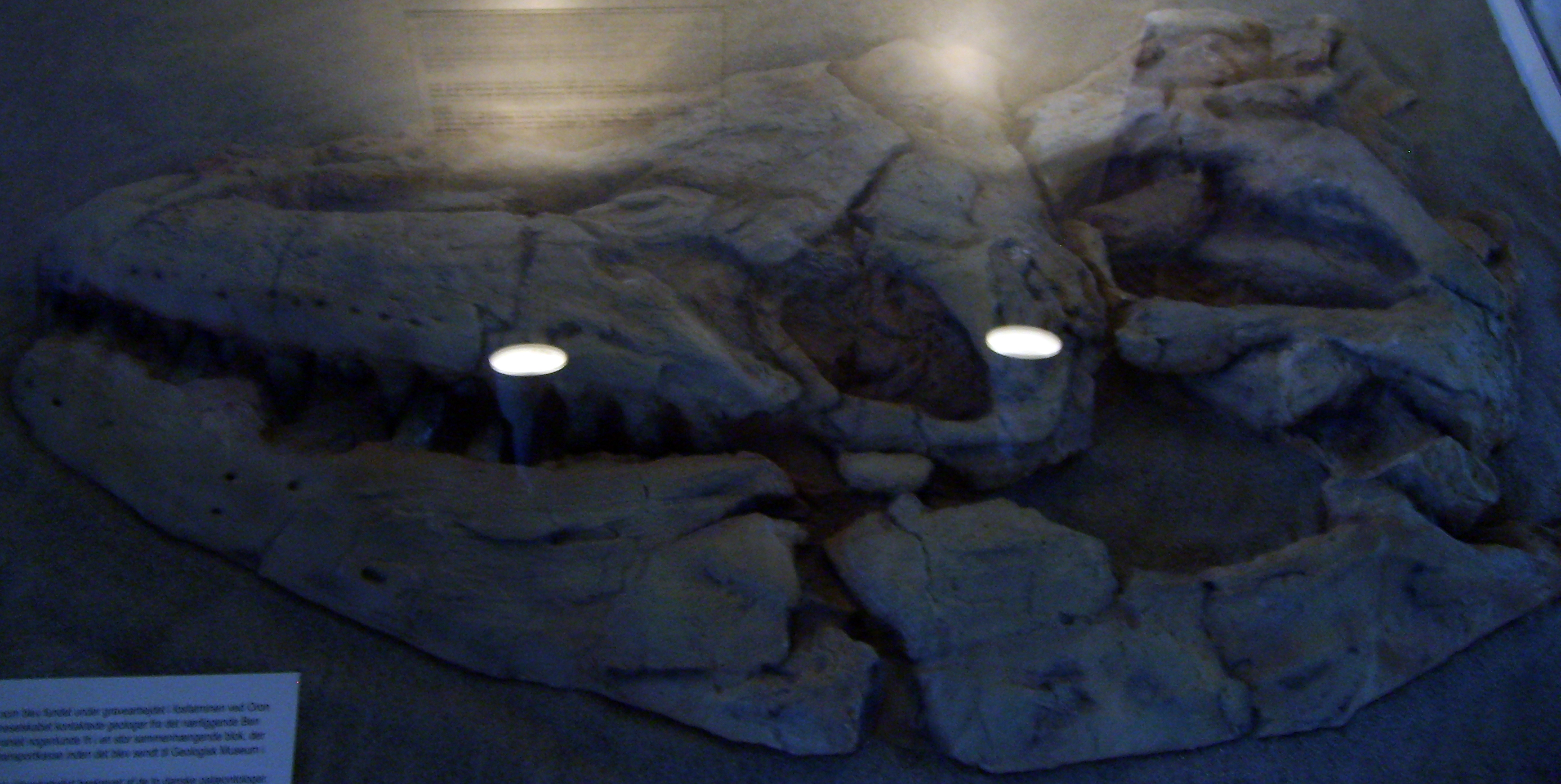
Skull of Prognathodon currii

==== 1993 ====
- According to Russell, by this time at least 1,823 mosasaur specimens had been recovered from the Niobrara Chalk of Kansas alone.
- Phosphate diggers in the Negev Desert of Israel discovered the remains of a 40-foot mosasaur that was sent to Copenhagen, Denmark for preparation. This mosasaur was nicknamed "Oronosaurus" after the phosphate field in which it was discovered, but would be formally named as a new species of Prognathodon, P. currii, in 2002.
- Lingham-Soliar re-examined the mosasaur genus Liodon.
- Schumacher published additional research on mosasaur biostratigraphy based on Stewart's 1990 paper.

==== 1994 ====
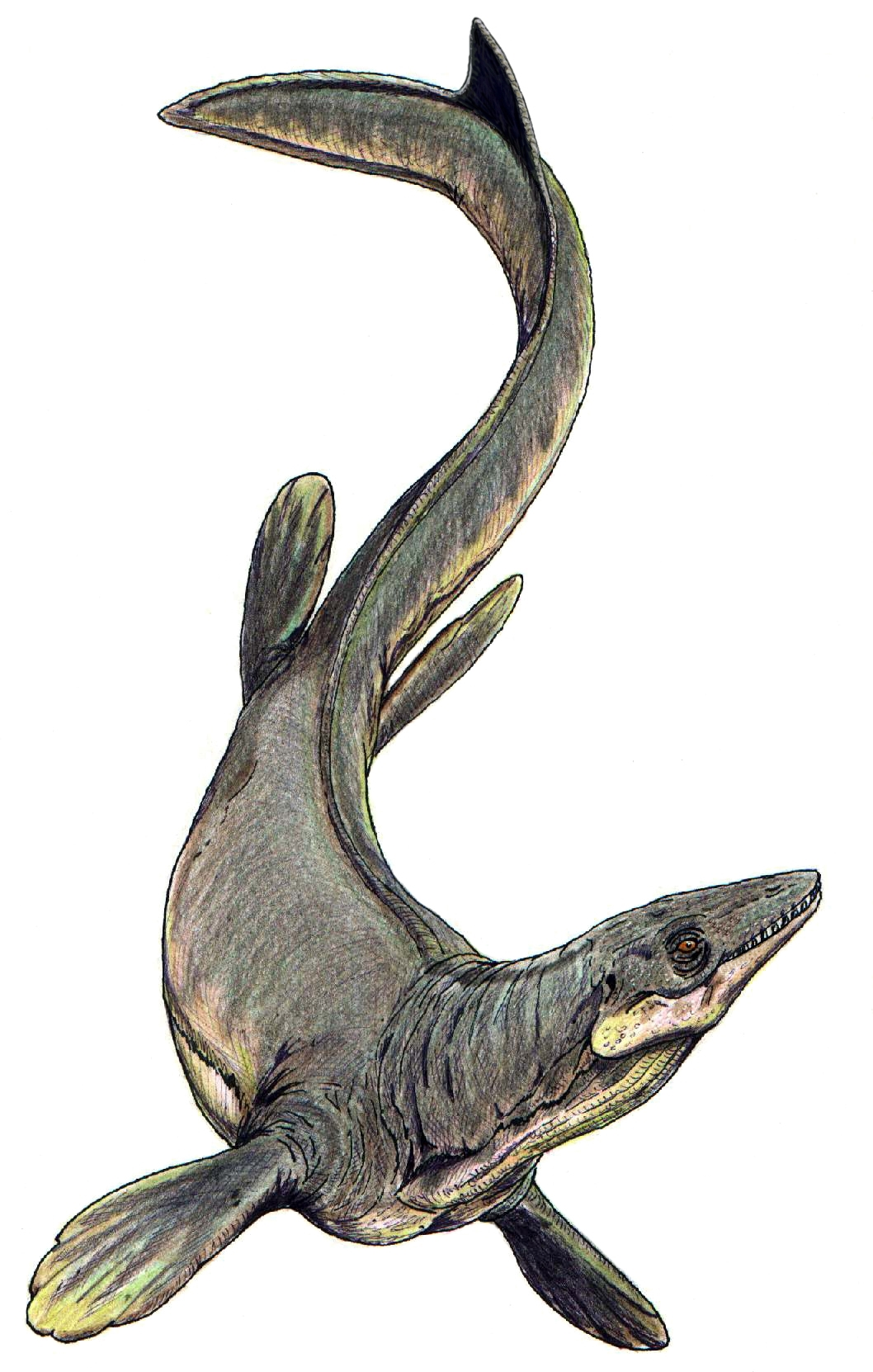
Life restoration of Plioplatecarpus

- Lingham-Soliar published a review of Turonian mosasaur fossils that were discovered in Angola. Commenting on the evolutionary origins of the mosasaurs, he remarked that while aigialosaurs had the correct anatomy to be the ancestors of the mosasaurs they were only known from rocks of the same age as the mosasaurs themselves. Until the presence of aigialosaurs earlier in the Cretaceous could be confirmed, Lingham-Soliar noted that there would be room to doubt this hypothesized connection even if it seemed plausible.
- Stewart and Bell argued that the supposed oldest known mosasaur fossils reported by Martin and Stewart from Kansas were not even the remains of mosasaurs. Instead, they attributed the fossils to several kinds of ichthyodectiform fishes.
- Judy Massare observed that mosasaurs exhibited adaptations for rapid acceleration and probably employed this capability as ambush hunters.
- Lingham-Soliar reported the presence of abundant mosasaur remains in Angola and Zaire and observed that Africa was a hotspot of mosasaur discoveries on the same scale as western North America and the Netherlands-Belgium region. He identified four species from Zaire: Halisaurus, Mosasaurus, Plioplatecarpus, and Prognathodon. He also synonymized Angolasaurus with Platecarpus. He considered this genus to be the most widespread of any mosasaur. He interpreted Plioplatecarpus as a snake-like ratchet feeder that "walked" its jaws across large prey to swallow it. He also hypothesized that it swam using its flippers rather than relying on its tail fin.
- Nicholls and Godfrey rejected Lingham-Soliar's reinterpretation of Plioplatecarpus marshi locomotion as underwater flight because there was no reason to believe that its tail was a less developed or effective means of propulsion than those of other mosasaurs. They suggested that its powerful shoulder region was actually an adaptation for shaking prey, like some modern shark species do.
- Massare argued that mosasaurs were cold blooded, like their relatives the monitor lizards.

January

- Patrick Antuzzi discovered a mosasaur skull in the Chico Formation of California. The specimen is now catalogued as SC-VR59 and may have belonged to a species of Clidastes resembling members of this genus previously from New Zealand.

==== 1995 ====
- Theagarten Lingham-Soliar published the first truly thorough description of Mosasaurus hoffmani. He interpreted its preferred habitat as biodiverse coastal waters of depths from 40–50 m. In this paper he also argued that mosasaurs went extinct rapidly.
- Gordon Bell and Martin reported a Mosasaurus conodon skull fossil bearing bite marks apparently inflicted by another M. conodon.
- Michael Everhart discovered a series of five large mosasaur vertebrae with two Cretoxyrhina teeth embedded in it. He found evidence the bone material had been partially dissolved where it had not been exposed to the elements. This implies that these vertebrae had been partially digested before fossilization by the shark that fed upon it. The shark probably only scavenged the specimen, but Everhart could not rule out predation.
- Pete Bussen discovered a specimen of Globidens in the Pierre Shale of Kansas. This was the first specimen of the genus to be documented in Kansas.

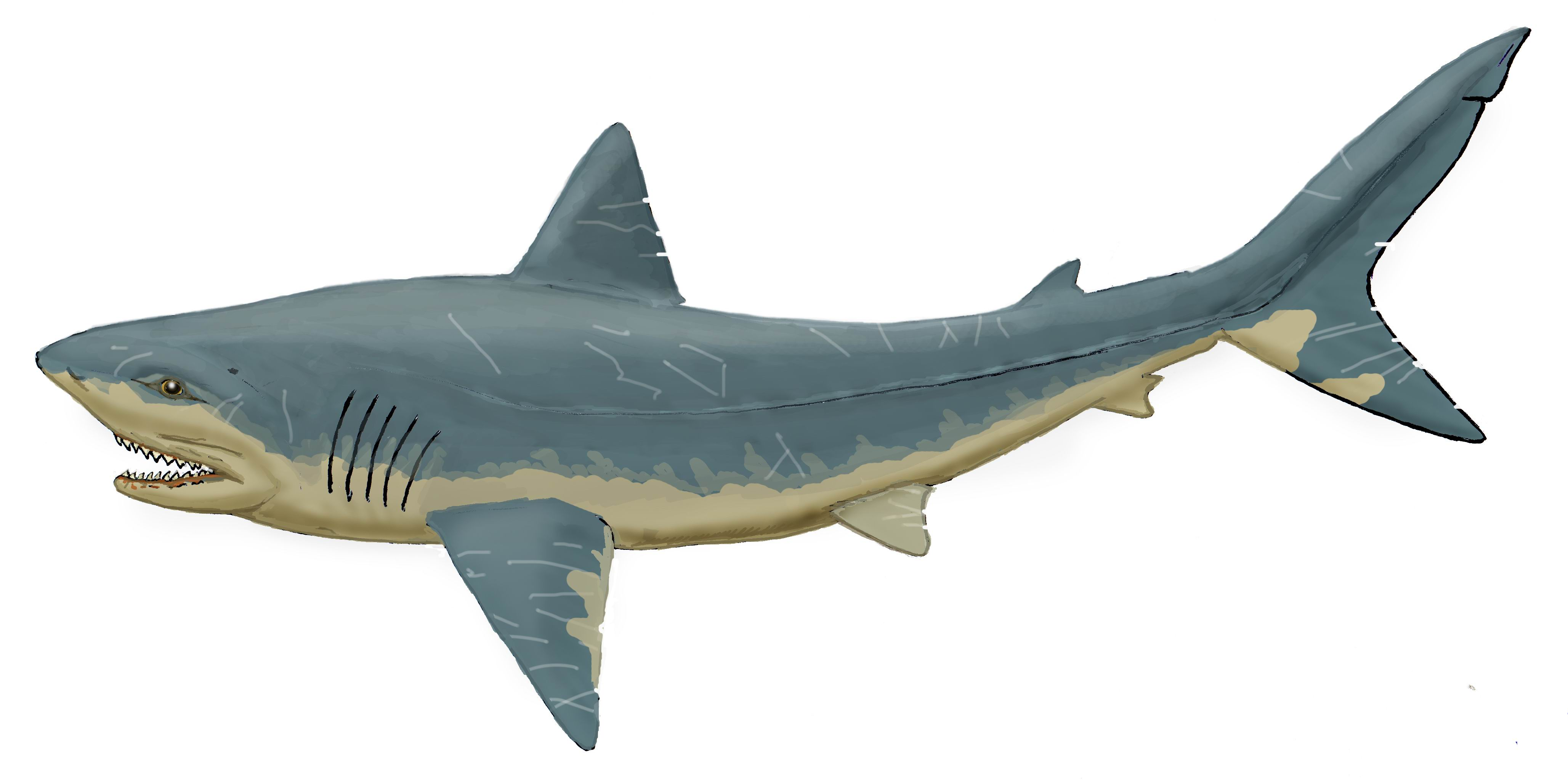
Life restoration of the shark Squalicorax. Squalicorax teeth are often associated with mosasaur fossils

==== 1996 ====
- Gordon Bell reported the discovery of a specimen of Plioplatecarpus primaevus accompanied by two embryos of the same species. Both the remains of mother and young were accompanied more than two thousand of teeth shed by shark of the genus Squalicorax. These sharks probably only scavenged the mosasaurs and were likely responsible for the disarticulated state of the skeletons. This discovery proved that mosasaurs gave live birth.
- Sheldon published additional research on mosasaur biostratigraphy based on Stewart's 1990 paper. One notable find was a P. planifrons fossil in the upper Smoky Hill Chalk, the uppermost known remains of this species.
- Cowen disagreed with Lingham-Soliar's claim that Plioplatecarpus marshi was an underwater flyer and suggested that P. marshi's unusual traits were actually specializations for swimming near the surface of the water column by overcoming Carrier's constraint.
- Steve Johnson discovered a complete Platecarpus planifrons skull.
- Schumacher and Varner observed more evidence for tail bends in the genera Clidastes, Platecarpus, and Tylosaurus.

September

- Michael and Pam Everhart excavated the skull and neck of a mosasaur in Kansas.

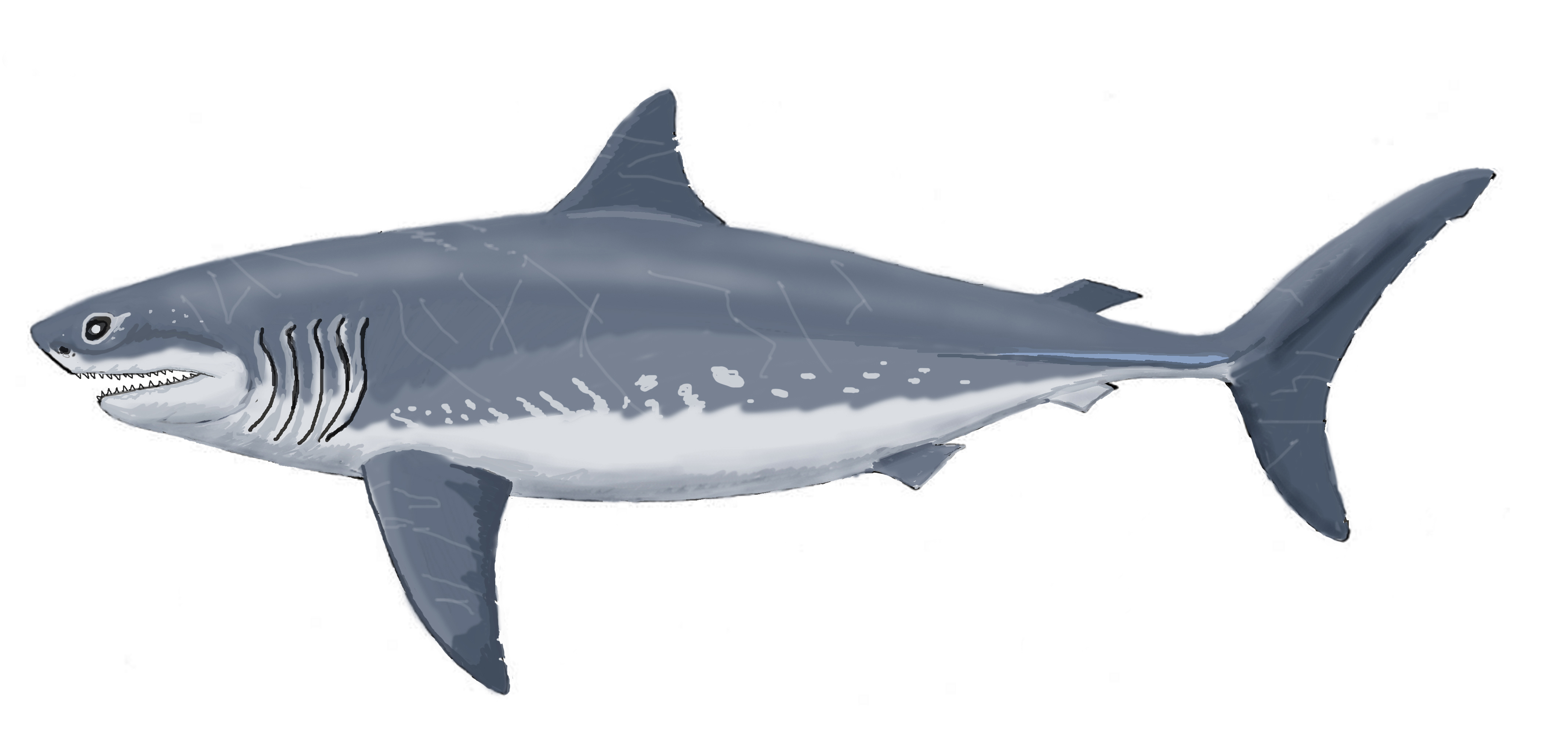
Life restoration of the shark Cretoxyrhina. Cretoxyrhina teeth are often associated with mosasaur fossils.

==== 1997 ====
- Gordon Bell favorably assessed the mosasaur fossil record, finding its documentation of their evolutionary history nearly as complete as the fossil record of horses.
- Bell published a detailed review of mosasaur biostratigraphy.
- In contrast to Williston and Martin and Rothschild, Amy Sheldon interpreted Clidastes as a deep water diver because its bones were less dense than those of other mosasaurs, lending it neutral buoyancy during descents. Meanwhile, she argued that Platecarpus preferred shallower waters.
- Michael Lee argued that mosasaurs and snakes were sister groups.
- Caldwell and Lee argued that the new snake genus and species Pachyrhachis problematicus was more evidence for a close evolutionary affinity between mosasaurs and snakes.
- Tom Caggiano discovered a partial jaw once belonging to a young mosasaur in Kansas. This specimen had been partially digested, possibly by the shark Cretoxyrhina mantelli.
- Shimada reported evidence that mosasaurs were fed upon by sharks, although this may have been scavenging rather than active predation.
- Richard P. Hilton and Antuzzi reported the possible Clidastes skull SC-VR59 from California to the scientific literature.

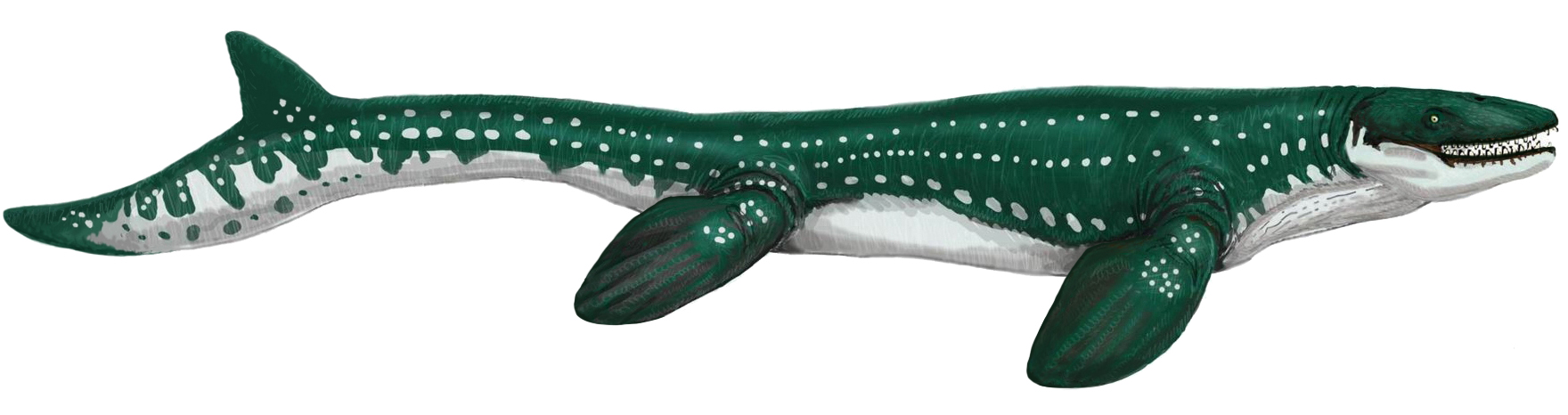
Life restoration of Prognathodon saturator

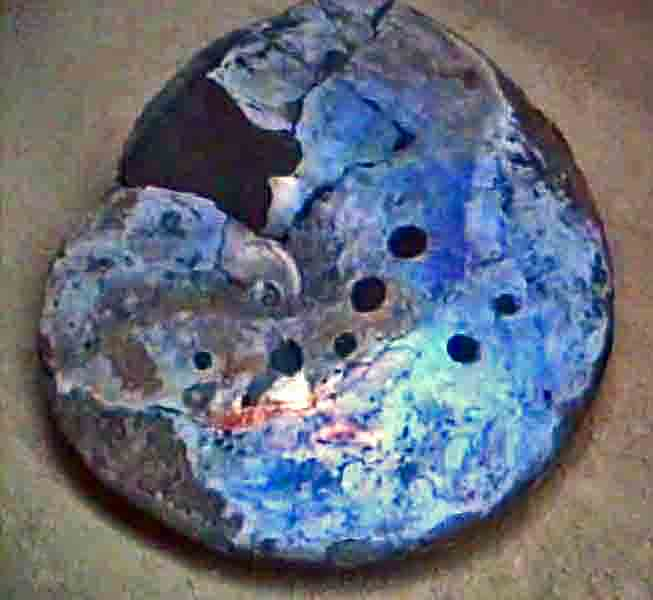
Fossil shell of the ammonoid Placenticeras, showing putative mosasaur toothmarks

==== 1998 ====
- Fossils of a mosasaur related to Tylosaurus were discovered on Vega Island, Antarctica.
- Bardet and others reported the discovery of a partial Plioplatecarpus marshi near Liège, Belgium with a tail vertebra bearing grooves apparently inflicted by the shark Centrophorodes appendiculatus, which scavenged the mosasaurs remains before burial.
- Ruud Dortangs discovered the skeleton of a new species of Prognathodon, P. saturator, in a Maastricht cement quarry.
- Lingham-Soliar reported evidence of damage to the skull and braincase of an immature Mosasaurus hoffmanni. He observed that the area of trauma was similar in size and shape to the bony prow at the tip of the snout of a Hainosaurus. Lingham-Soliar believed that the larger Hainosaurus rammed the young Mosasaurus to death with this snout prow.
- Peter Ward argued that the supposed toothmarks on a Placenticeras shell described in 1960 by Kauffman and Kesling were actually limpet boreholes. He described how a graduate student named Erica Roux was unable replicate tooth-shaped punctures in the shells of modern Nautilus with a mechanical "jaw" because the shells were too brittle.
- Kase and others also attributed the rounded indentations and puncture marks to limpets rather than mosasaurs.
- Seilacher provided a third voice in favor of the limpet interpretation of punctured ammonite shells.
- Bell and VonLoh reported the discovery of mosasauroids from the Boquillas Formation of Texas and the Greenhorn Formation of South Dakota.
- Lingham-Soliar reported the discovery of a mosasaur called Pluridens walkeri from Africa with unusually long, toothy jaws.

August 8th

- An additional nearly complete skeleton of Mosasaurus hoffmani was discovered in the St. Pietersburg quarry of Masstricht and excavated by crews under the auspices of the Dutch Geological Society and Natural History Museum of Maastricht.

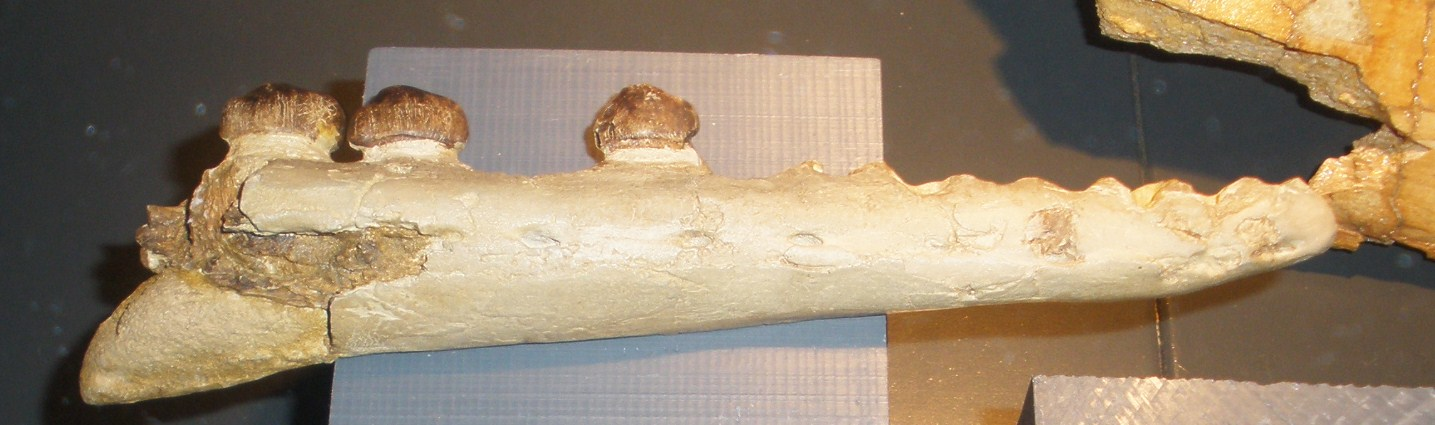
Jaw and teeth of Carinodens

==== 1999 ====
- Holmes Caldwell and Cumbaa rejected the idea that Plioplatecarpus swam using its flippers to "fly" underwater. They noted however, that a specimen of the genus from Scabby Butte, Alberta, Canada seems to have been preserved in a relatively inland and freshwater environmental context, possibly an estuary.
- Lingham-Soliar regarded Goronyosaurus as the most derived mosasaurid. He also speculated on the ecological conditions that allowed the mosasaurs to achieve dominance of the ichthyosaurs and plesiosaurs. Lingham-Soliar observed that the evolution of swifter swimming fishes in the mid-Cretaceous would have challenged predators that actively chased them while yielding a competitive advantage to sneakier ambush hunters. He thought these conditions gave an advantage to mosasaurs and plesiosaurs over the ichthyosaurs and led to the latter group's extinction.
- Lingham Soliar reconstructed the heterodont dentition of Carinodens. Teeth near the tip of the jaw were pointed, teeth near the rear were roughly rectangular and triangular teeth could be found between them.
- Everhart reported physical evidence of shark bite in the mosasaur genera Clidastes, Platecarpus, and Tylosaurus.
- Lingham-Soliar argued that the disappearance of the mosasaurs at their peak of size and diversity was evidence that the mass extinction at the end of the Cretaceous was a rapid event.
- Lee and others argued that snakes were the descendants of mosasaurs.
- Lee, Bell, and Caldwell argued that mosasaurs were the closest relatives of snakes among the traditional lizards.
- Polcyn, Tchernov, and Jacobs described the new genus and species Haasia gittelmani.
- Sakurai and Shibuya described the new species Mosasaurus prismaticus.
- Kass described the species Prognathodon stadtmani.

== 21st century ==
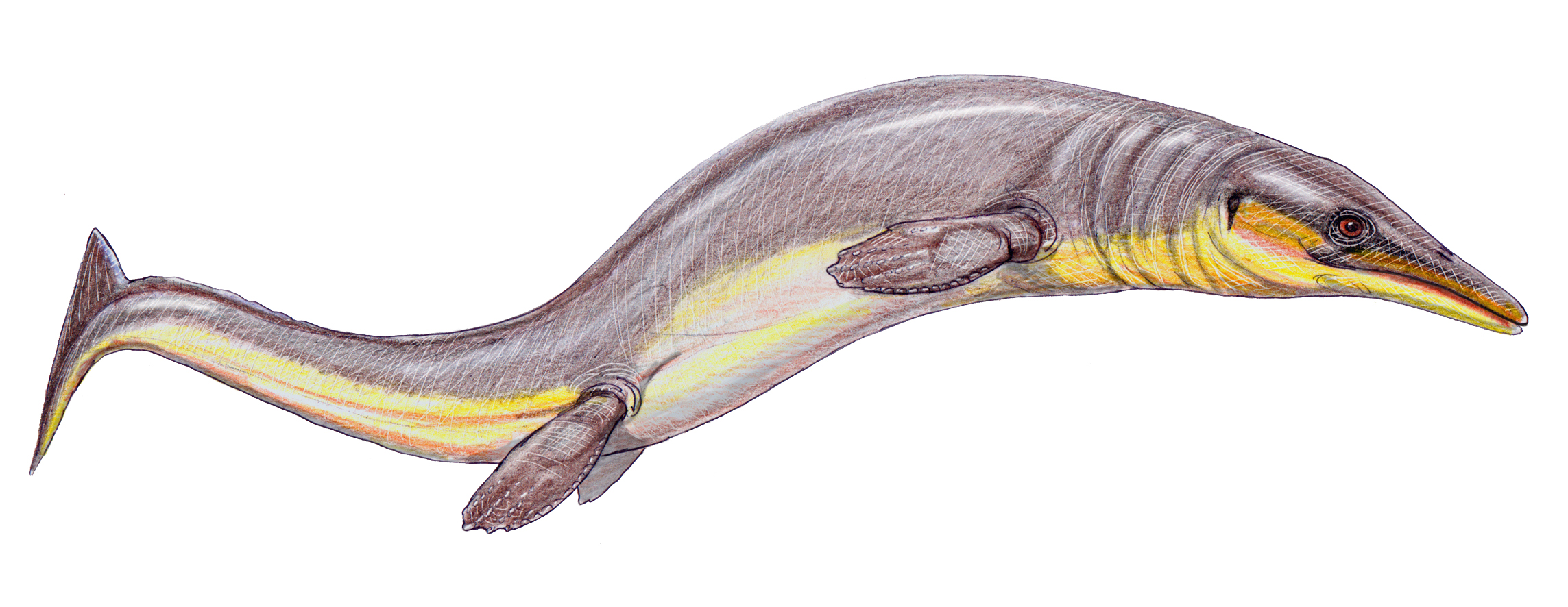
Life restoration of Halisaurus

=== 2000s ===
==== 2000 ====
- Holmes and Sues argued that Phosphorosaurus was distinct from Halisaurus after all.
- Lingham-Soliar disagreed with Russell's 1970 synonymization of Mosasaurus lemmonnieri and M. conodon.
- Tchernov and others dismissed the snakes Haasiophis and Pachyrhachis, which had been previously put forward as evidence that snakes were close relatives of mosasaurs, as red herrings that were irrelevant to understanding the origin of snakes or any potential evolutionary ties linking them to mosasaurs.
- Case and others published more research on mosasaurs from islands off the coast of Antarctica.
- Páramo-Fonseca described the new genus and species Yaguarasaurus columbianus.

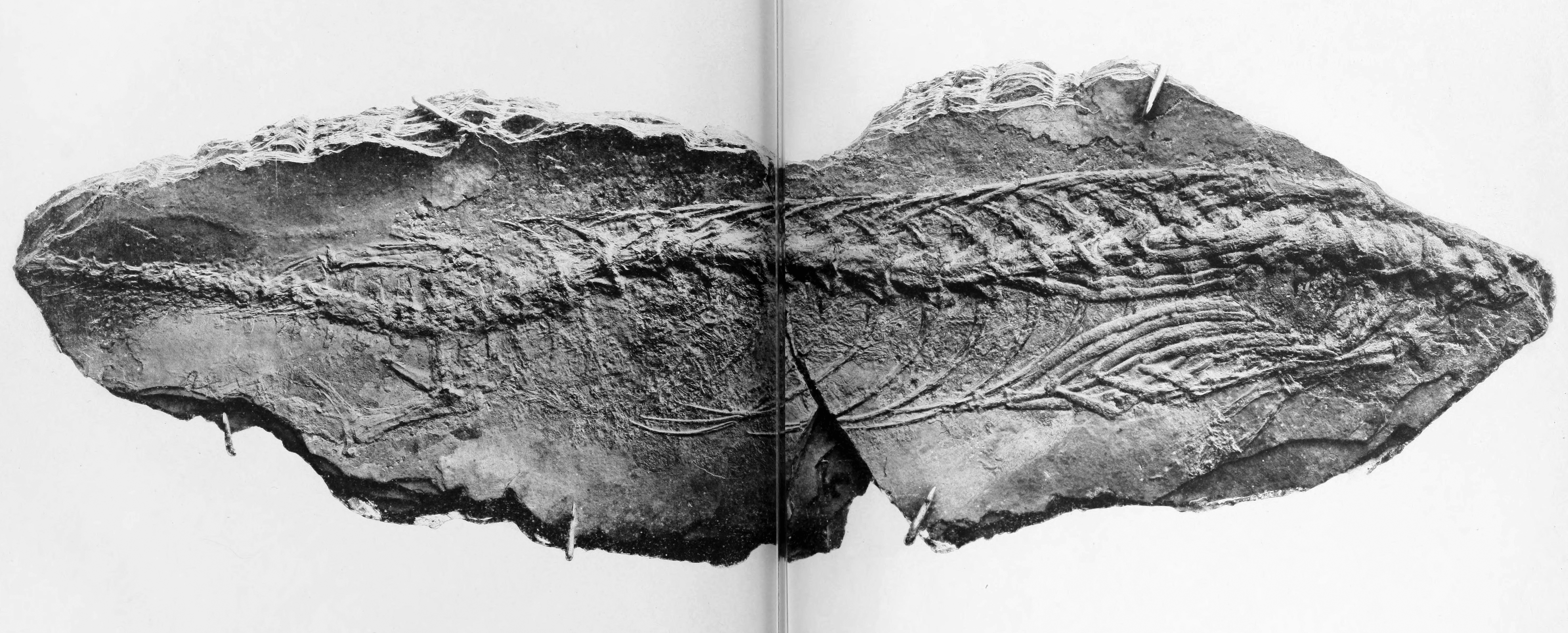
Carsosaurus fossils

==== 2001 ====
- Caldwell and Lee reported the discovery of a pregnant aigialosaur specimen of the genus Carsosaurus containing four large embryos inside her. The embryos were oriented ready to be born tail-first, an adaptation seen in modern whales and in other extinct marine reptiles that helps prevent drowning during birth.
- Tsujita and Westermann defended the idea of punctured ammonite shells as mosasaur prey in a contrarian position to the several 1998 papers that doubted this hypothesis. Based on a survey of Placenticeras shells from the Bearpaw Formation of Alberta, they concluded that the arrangements of the holes were too similar to the placement of teeth in a mosasaur's jaw to be the chance result of limpet activity. Their doubts were bolstered by the disparity of abundance in the relevant rocks between the scarce limpet shells and the frequent occurrence of the holes themselves. According to Tsujita and Westermann, the previous attempts to test the effect of a mosasaur bite on a shell experimentally with a simulated jaw assumed an overly simplistic interpretation of mosasaur feeding behavior, so its failure to replicate the shell punctures still did not discredit their putative mosasaurian origins.
- Bardet and Superbiola restudied the Halisaurus remains first discovered in Kansas in 1918 and classified as Halisaurus by Russell in 1970. They found it to be both the oldest specimen referred to that genus and the most primitive member of the entire Mosasauridae.
- Everhart serendipitously rediscovered Sternberg's report of a Tylosaurus with polycotylid stomach contents.

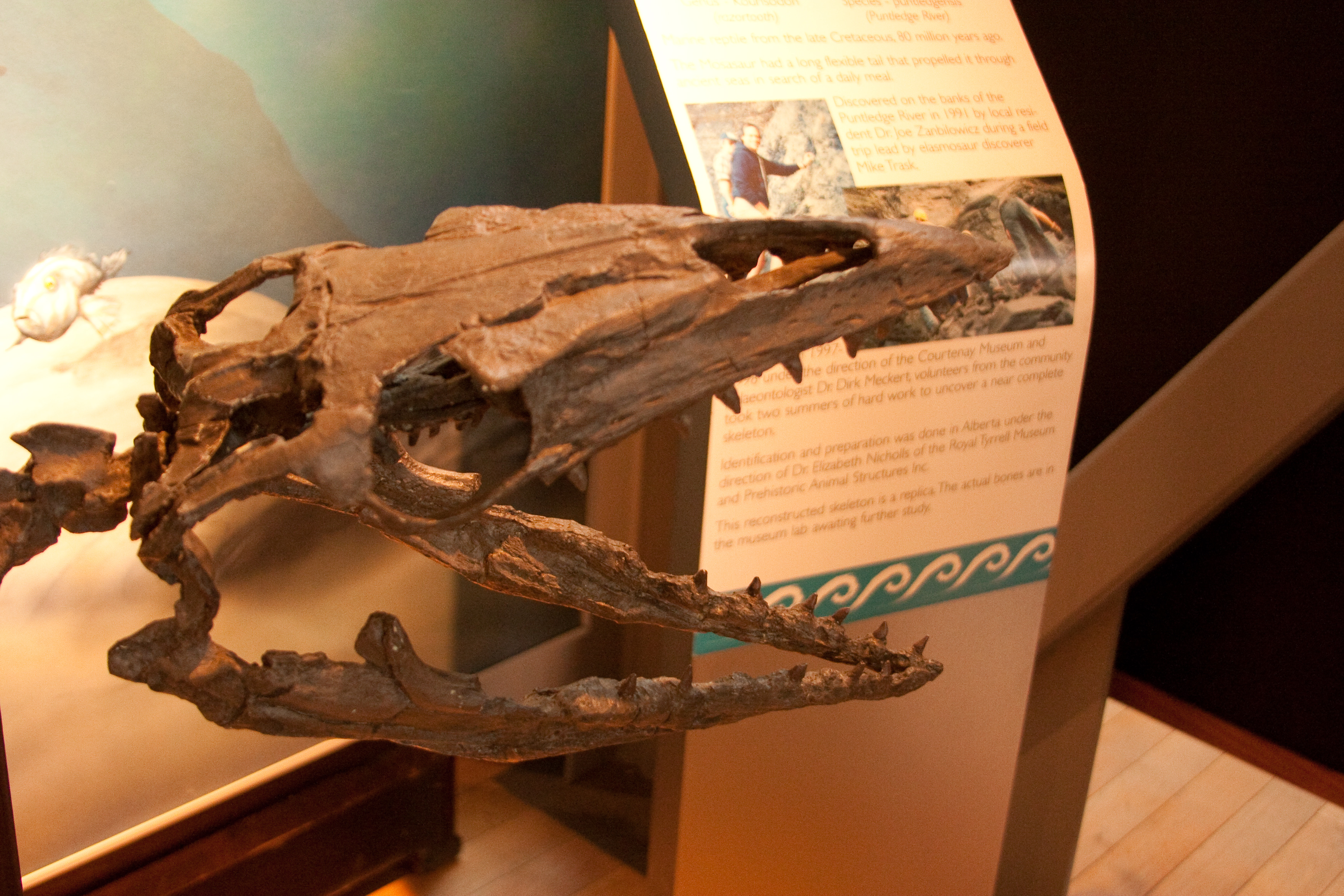
Mounted skull of Kourisodon

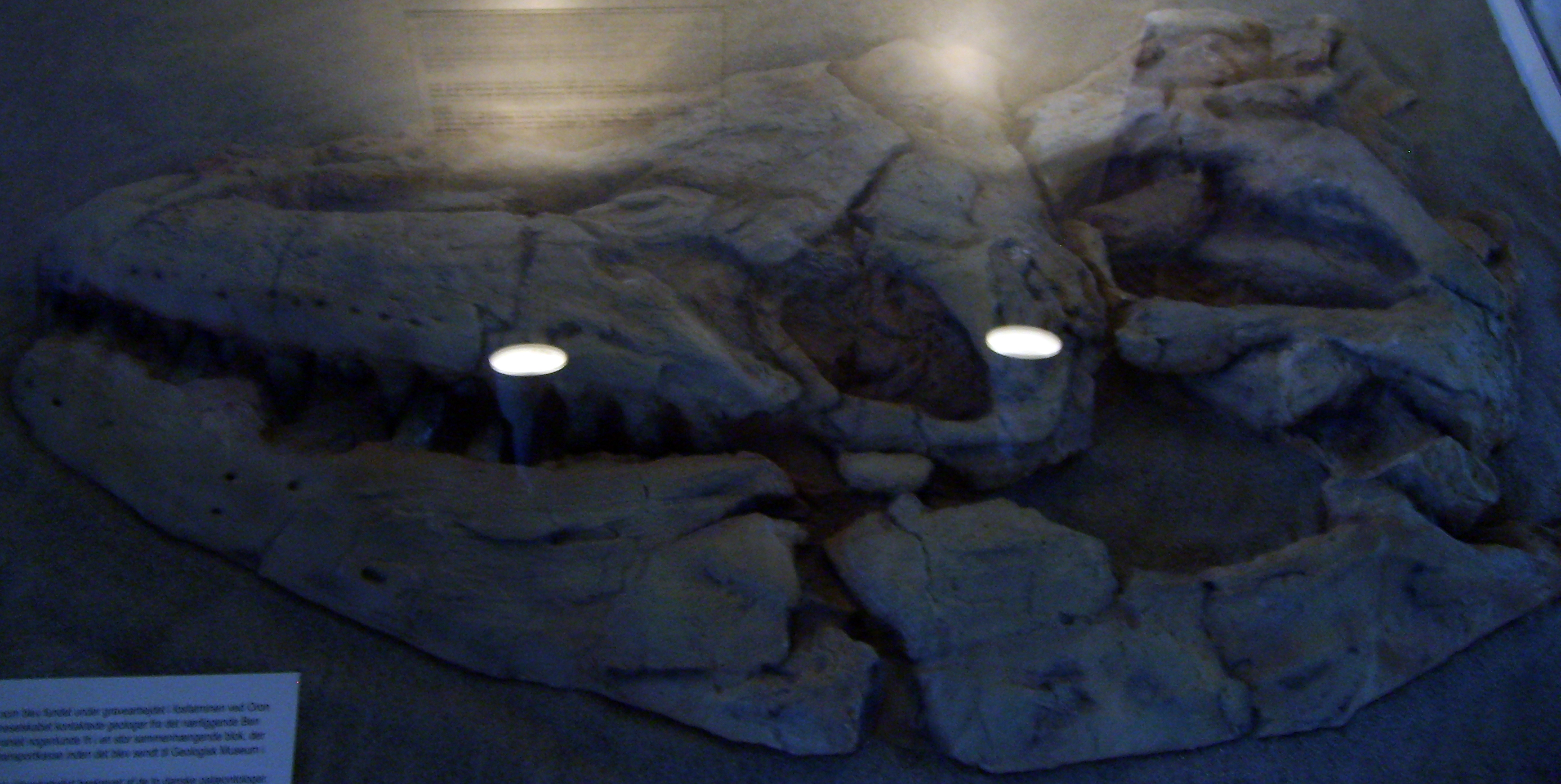
Skull of Prognathodon currii

==== 2002 ====
- Michael Everhart observed that young mosasaur fossils are actually fairly common in the Niobrara Chalk.
- Caitlin Kiernan observed that different kinds of mosasaurs were found at different stratigraphic levels within the Eutaw Formation and Selma Group of Alabama. She described three biostratigraphic zones within this interval based on their mosasaur content: the Tylosaurus acme zone, the Clidastes zone, and the Mosasaurus acme zone. The Tylosaurus zone was deposited in shallow water, while Clidastes seems to have inhabited greater depths.
- Bardet and Tonoglu reported the discovery of Mosasaurus hoffmanni jaw fossils in Kastamonu, Turkey.
- Novas and others described the new species Lakumasaurus antarcticus.
- Dortangs and others described the new species Prognathodon saturator.
- Nicholls and Meckert described the new genus and species Kourisodon puntledgensis.
- Thegarten Lingham-Soliar argued against Nathalie Bardet's attribution of ichthyosaur extinction to the loss of their preferred food sources in the Cenomanian-Turonian extinction event expanded on his own 1999 attribution of ichthyosaur extinction to biotic factors. During the Cretaceous the evolution of many fish groups trended towards faster swimming body types, making them harder to hunt for adult ichthyosaurs and harder to escape from for newborn ichthyosaurs. This ecological scene favored ambush predators like plesiosaurs and the newly evolved mosasaurs over the ichthyosaurs, who succumbed to the competition.

September

- Christansen and Bonde formally named the Negev desert mosasaur Prognathodon currii.

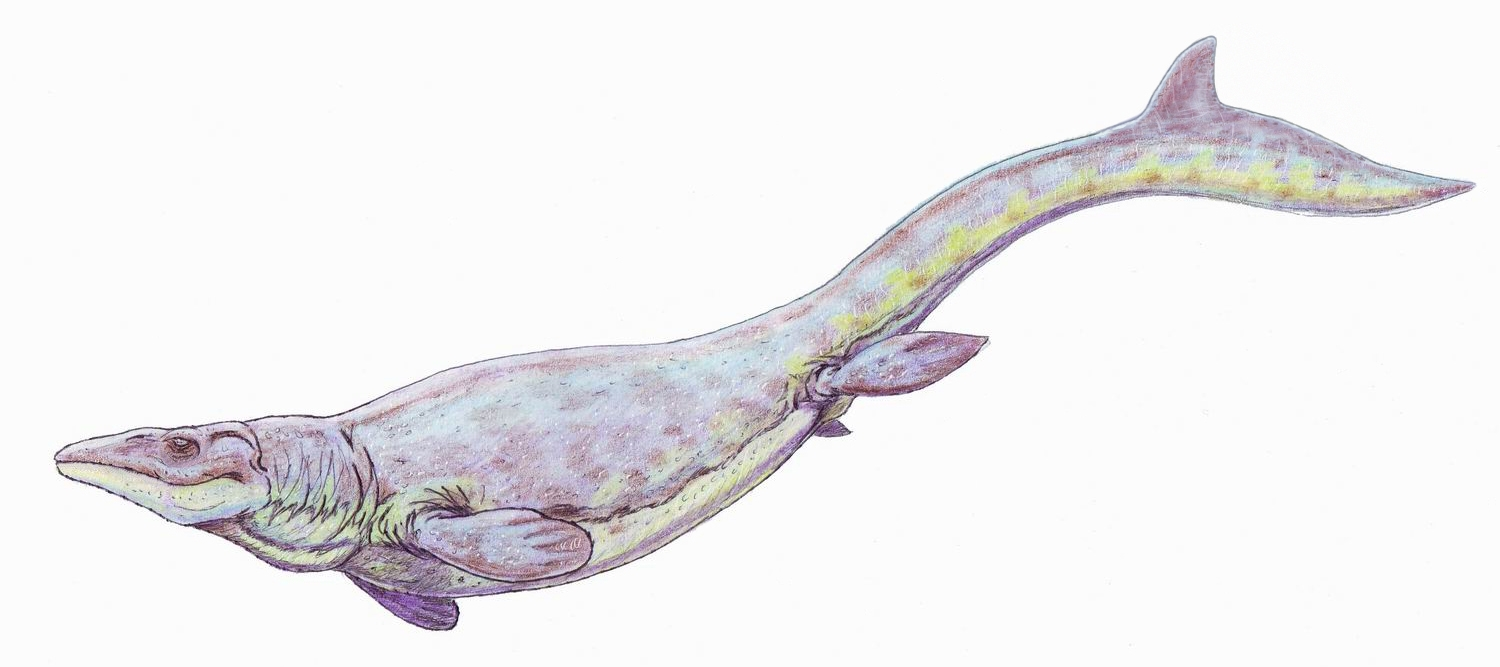
Life restoration of Globidens

==== 2003 ====
- Caldwell and others published a study on the tooth replacement patterns of mosasaurs. They found that mosasaurs replaced their teeth continuously throughout their lives, with each replacing being slightly larger than its predecessor.
- Polcyn, Tchernov, and Jacobs erected the new genus Haasiasaurus to house the species "Haasia" gittelmani because its generic name had been previously used for a different kind of animal and needed replacing.
- Bardet, Suberbiola, and Jalil described the new genus and species Tethysaurus nopscai.

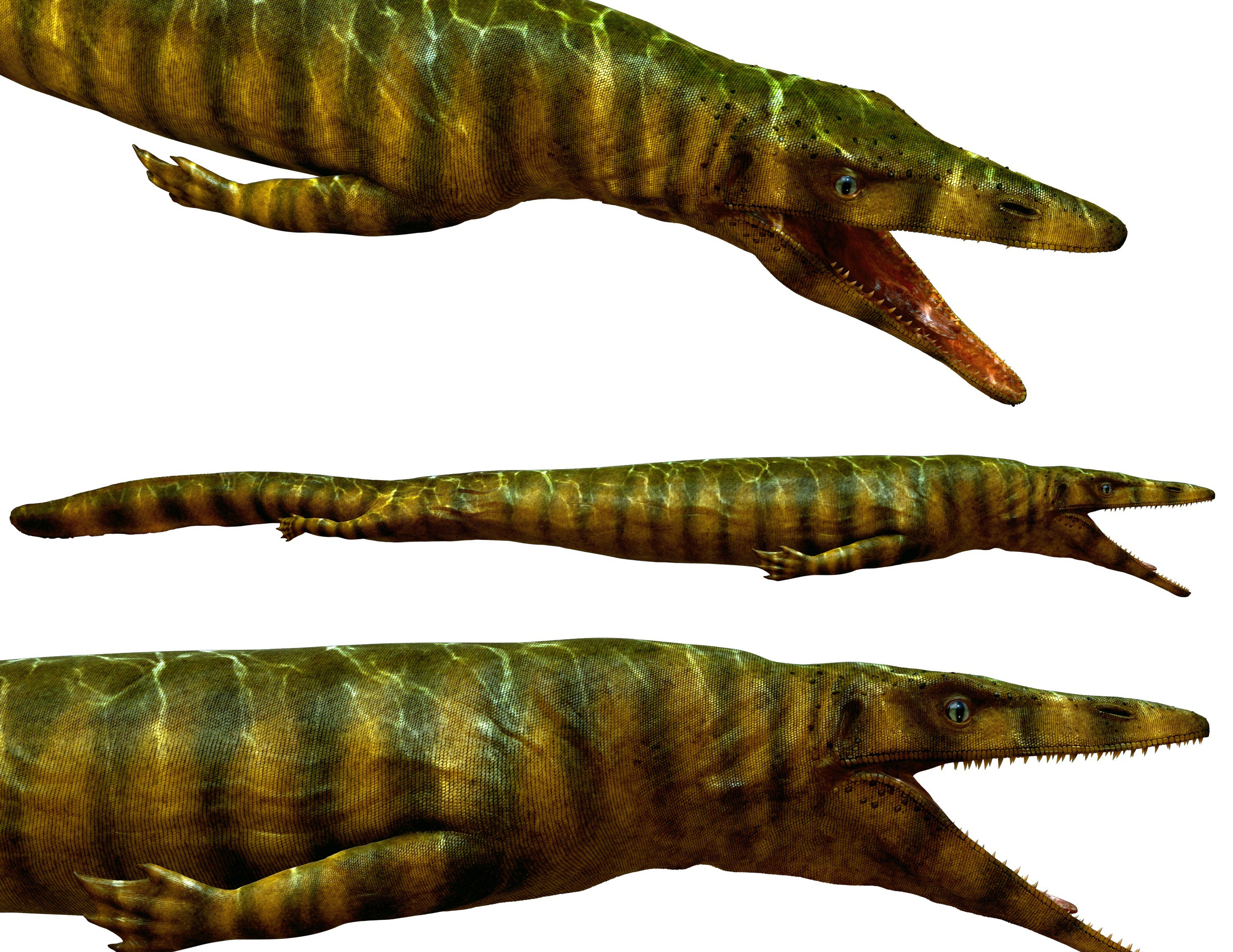
Life restoration of Dallasaurus

==== 2004 ====
- Lindgren and Siverson argued that mosasaurs almost went extinct during the middle of the Campanian age, but subsequently recovered their lost biodiversity.
- Martin and Fox reported the discovery of crushed bivalve shells in the stomach of a Globidens specimen from the Pierre Shale of South Dakota.

May

- Gordon Bell and Mike Caldwell rediscovered the mosasaur snout fragment discovered by Harlan. Using photographs of the Goldfuss mosasaur skull by Takehito Ikejiri they were able to verify that the specimens did in fact come from the same individual.

==== 2005 ====
- Polcyn and Bell described the new genus and species Russellosaurus coheni.
- Bardet and others described the new species Halisaurus arambourgi.
- Everhart described the new species Tylosaurus kansasensis.
- Bell and Polcyn described the new genus and species Dallasaurus turneri.

==== 2007 ====
- Martin described the new species Globidens schurmanni.

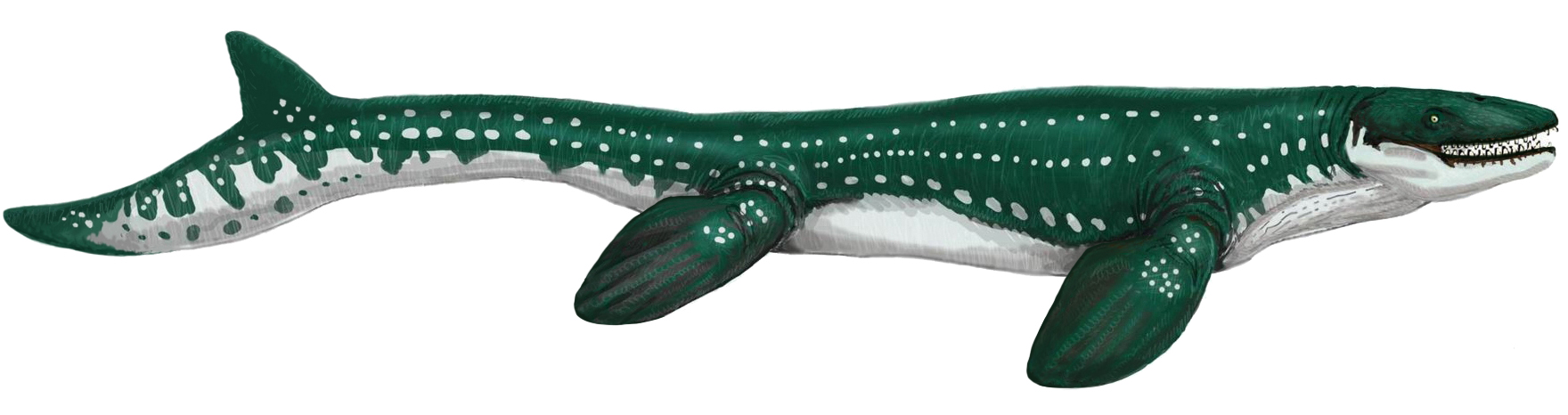
Life restoration of Prognathodon, showing a shark-like tail fluke

==== 2008 ====
- Schulp and others described the new species Prognathodon kianda.
- Polcyn and Everhart described the species Selmasaurus johnsoni.
- Caldwell and others described the new species Taniwhasaurus mikasaensis.
- Smith and Buchy described the new genus and species Vallecillosaurus donrobertoi.

==== 2009 ====
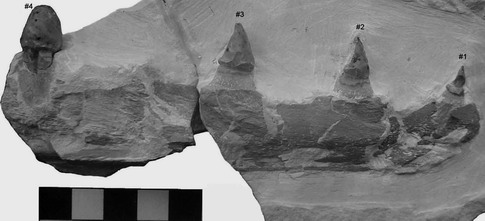
Mandible of Harranasaurus

- Schulp, Bardet and Bouya described the new species Carinodens minalmamar.
- Kaddumi described many new mosasaur taxa, including species of Prognathodon, Globidens and Carinodens as well as the new genera Tenerasaurus (later synonymized with Prognathodon) and Harranasaurus.

=== 2010s ===
==== 2011 ====
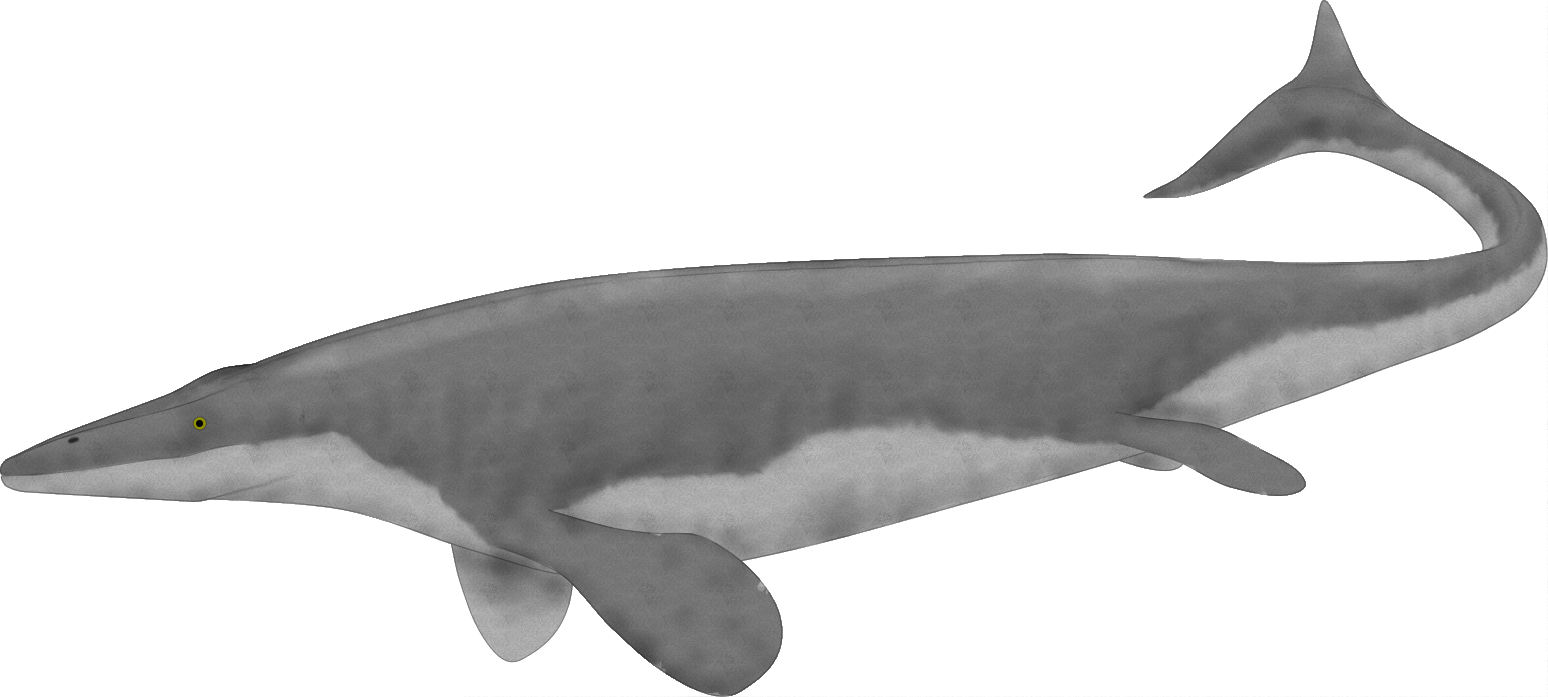
Life restoration of Plesioplatecarpus

- Konishi and Caldwell the new genus and species Latoplatecarpus willistoni and referred the species "Plioplatecarpus" nichollsae to the same genus. They also erected a second new genus, Plesioplatecarpus for the species "Clidastes" planifrons.

==== 2012 ====
- Leblanc, Caldwell and Bardet described the new genus and species Eremiasaurus heterodontus.
- Makádi, Caldwell and Ősi described the new genus and species Pannoniasaurus inexpectatus.

==== 2013 ====
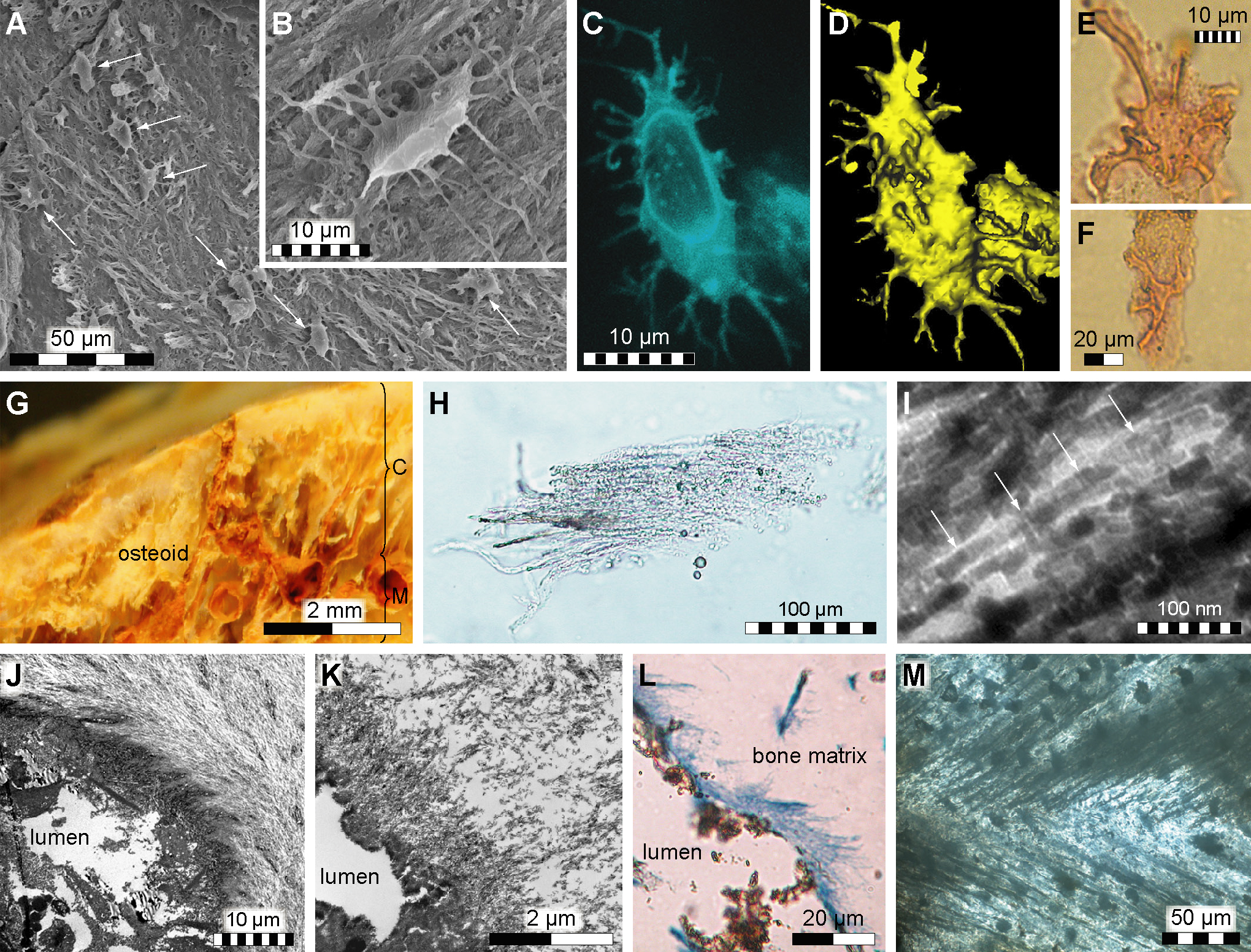
Soft tissue and microstructures recovered from the humerus of a Prognathodon specimen in 2013

- Lindgren, Kaddumi, and Polcyn reported the discovery of a Prognathodon specimen from Jordan that preserved the soft tissues of its scaley skin, flippers and tail. Significantly, the tail resembled those of modern carcharinid sharks, although the bottom lobe of the tail fin was longest in the mosasaur whereas shark tails have longer upper lobes.
- Páramo described the new species Eonatator coellensis.
- Palci, Caldwell and Papazzoni described the new genus Romeosaurus and the new species R. fumanensis and R. sorbinii.

==== 2015 ====
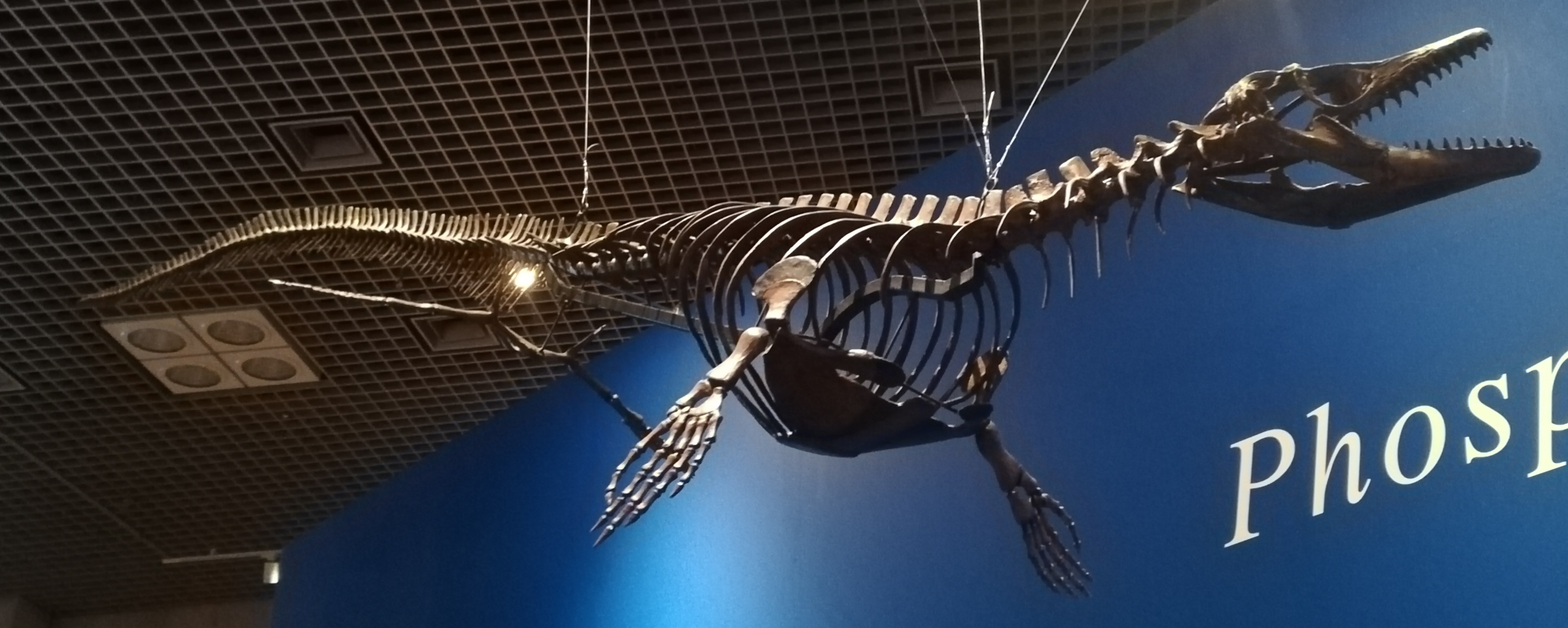
Skeleton of Phosphorosaurus ponpetelegans

- Konishi and others described the new species Phosphorosaurus ponpetelegans.
- Cuthbertson and Holmes described the new species Plioplatecarpus peckensis.

==== 2016 ====
- Longrich described the species Pluridens calabaria.
- A study on mosasaur tooth implantation and its phylogenetic implications is published by Liu et al. (2016).
- A redescription of the mosasaur Hainosaurus bernardi Dollo (1885) is published by Jimenez-Huidobro & Caldwell (2016), who transfer this species to the genus Tylosaurus and synonymize genera Tylosaurus and Hainosaurus.
- A revision of the species assigned to the mosasaur genus Tylosaurus is published by Jiménez-Huidobro, Simões & Caldwell (2016); their conclusion that T. kansasensis is a junior synonym of T. nepaeolicus is subsequently rejected by Stewart & Mallon (2018).

==== 2017 ====
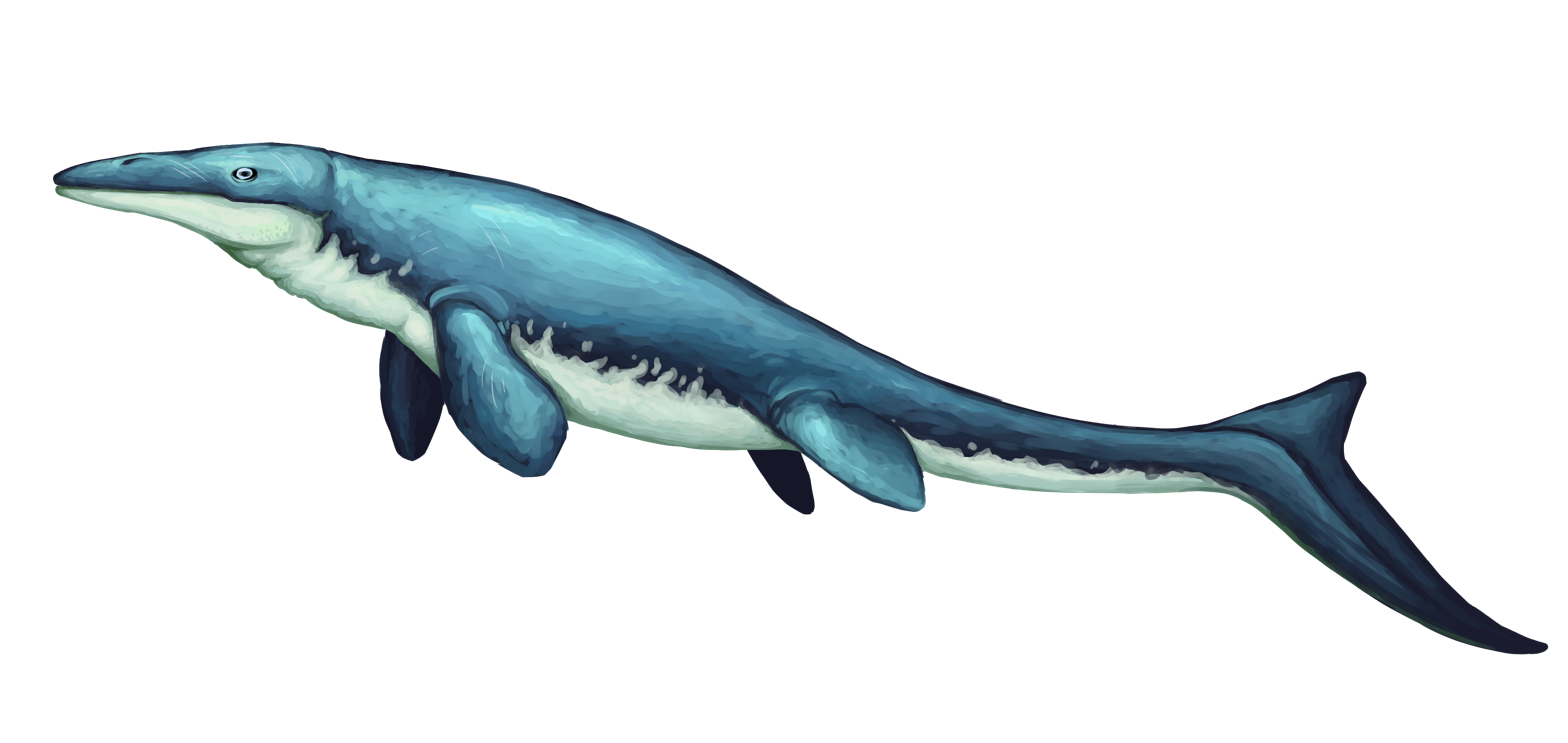
Life restoration of Kaikaifilu

- Otero and others described the new genus and species Kaikaifilu hervei.
- A study on the phylogenetic relationships of members of Mosasauroidea is published by Simões et al. (2017).
- A study on the robustness of the hypotheses about mosasauroid phylogenetic relationships and a reevaluation of the dataset from the study of Simões et al. (2017) is published by Madzia & Cau (2017).
- A revision of mosasauroids from the Upper Cretaceous marine sediments associated with Gondwanan landmasses is published by Jiménez-Huidobro, Simões & Caldwell (2017).
- A redescription of Mosasaurus hoffmannii based on examination of many specimens is published by Street & Caldwell (2017), who also provide emended diagnoses for both the genus Mosasaurus and its type species M. hoffmannii.
- A study on the presence of ligamentous tooth attachment in mosasaurs and in fossil and modern snakes is published by LeBlanc, Lamoureux & Caldwell (2017).

==== 2018 ====
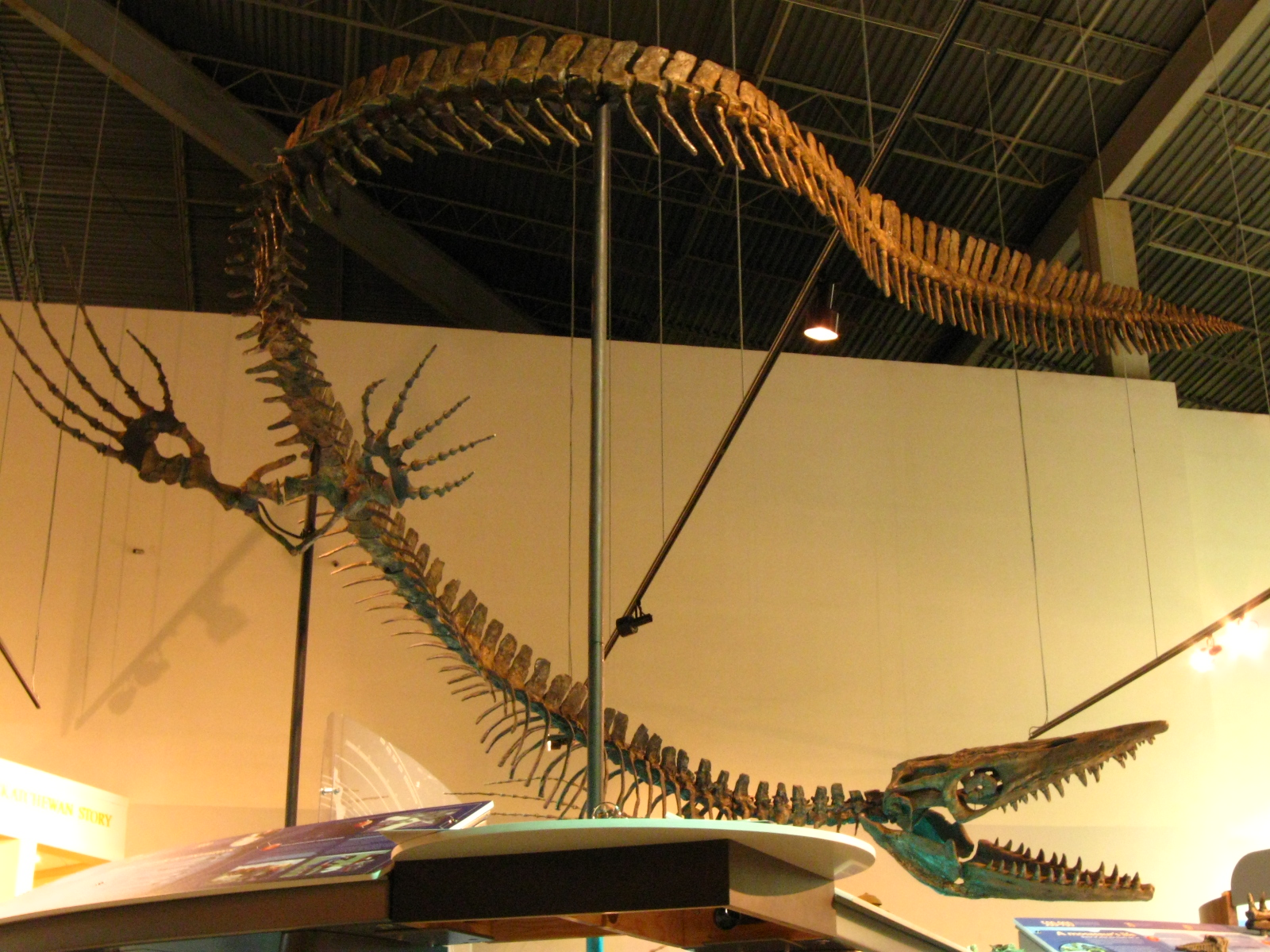
- Reconstructed skeleton of Tylosaurus saskatchewanensis
  Jiménez-Huidobro and others described the new species Tylosaurus saskatchewanensis.
- A basal mosasauroid specimen including a rib and a vertebra, representing a larger individual than the holotype of Phosphorosaurus ponpetelegans and predating P. ponpetelegans by approximately 10 million years, is reported from the Upper Cretaceous (lower Campanian) of Hokkaido (Japan) by Sato et al. (2018).
- Description of a Campanian mosasaur assemblage from the Hannover region of northern Germany is published by Hornung, Reich & Frerichs (2018), who confirm the presence of the genus Clidastes in northern central Europe, as well as the early Transatlantic distribution of a basal member of the genus Prognathodon during the lower Campanian.
- Description of two skulls of subadult specimens of Tylosaurus proriger from the Niobrara Formation (Kansas, United States), and a study on the allometric changes undergone by T. proriger through life, is published by Stewart & Mallon (2018), who reject the hypothesis presented by Jiménez-Huidobro, Simões & Caldwell (2016) that Tylosaurus kansasensis is a junior synonym of Tylosaurus nepaeolicus.
- The smallest-known, neonate-sized specimen of Tylosaurus is described from the Santonian portion of the Niobrara Chalk (Kansas, United States) by Konishi, Jiménez-Huidobro & Caldwell (2018).

==== 2019 ====
- A study evaluating the fossil record of mosasaurs in terms of fossil completeness as a measure of fossil quality is published by Driscoll et al. (2019).
- A study on the morphology of the marginal teeth of Mosasaurus lemonnieri, and on their implications for the distinguishability of this species on the basis of fossil teeth, will be published by Madzia (2019).
- A study on the anatomy of the inner ear of Platecarpus was published by Yi & Norell (2019).
- An isolated tooth of a tylosaurine mosasaur is described from the Turonian of the Apennine Carbonate Platform by Romano et al. (2019), representing the first tylosaurine from Italy and the southernmost occurrence of a tylosaurine in the northern margin of the Mediterranean Tethys.
- A study on the phylogenetic relationships of tylosaurine mosasaurs is published by Jiménez-Huidobro & Caldwell (2019).
- A review of the taxonomic history of Clidastes liodontus and "Clidastes moorevillensis" is published by Lively (2019).
- A juvenile mosasaur specimen affected by infectious arthritis and spondyloarthropathy is described from the upper Maastrichtian of Antarctica by Talevi et al. (2019), representing the first report of a skeletal pathology of a mosasaur from the Southern Hemisphere.
- Leblanc, Mohr & Caldwell described the new species Globidens simplex.
- Campbell Mekarski, Japundžić, Krizmanić & Caldwell describe a new genus from a specimen recovered in 2008 from Dugi Otok.

=== 2020s ===
==== 2020 ====
- Strong et al. described the new genus and species Gavialimimus almaghribensis.
- Lively reassigned the species Prognathodon stadtmani to the new genus Gnathomortis.
- A study on the evolutionary history of mosasauroids, comparing their evolutionary rates and traits to those of plesiosaurs and aiming to determine whether the rise and diversification of mosasauroids was influenced by competition with or disappearance of some plesiosaur taxa, is published by Madzia & Cau (2020).
- Grigoriev & Grabovskiy (2020) describe new fossil material of a tylosaurine from the Upper Cretaceous (Turonian) of the Chukotka Region (Russia), representing one of the oldest and northernmost mosasaur records reported so far, and evaluate the implications of this fossil material (as well as mosasaur fossils from the Santonian of the Komi Republic and from the Campanian–Maastrichtian of the Sakhalin Island) for the knowledge of the paleogeography and possible migrations of Arctic mosasaurs.
- A study on pathological features of a specimen of Prognathodon (belonging or related to the species P. sectorius) from the Maastrichtian Gulpen Formation (the Netherlands) is published by Bastiaans et al. (2020), who consider it most likely that this specimen was bitten in the snout by a large, possibly conspecific mosasaur, making it one of the few specimens with unambiguous evidence of agonistic interactions amongst mosasaurs.
- A study on the morphology of the snout of Taniwhasaurus antarcticus, indicating the presence of a complex internal neurovascular system of branched channels similar to systems present in extant aquatic vertebrates such as cetaceans and crocodiles, is published by Álvarez–Herrera, Agnolin & Novas (2020).
- Zietlow (2020) recovers growth series of Tylosaurus proriger and T. nepaeolicus, and tests the hypothesis that T. kansasensis represent juveniles of T. nepaeolicus.

==== 2021 ====
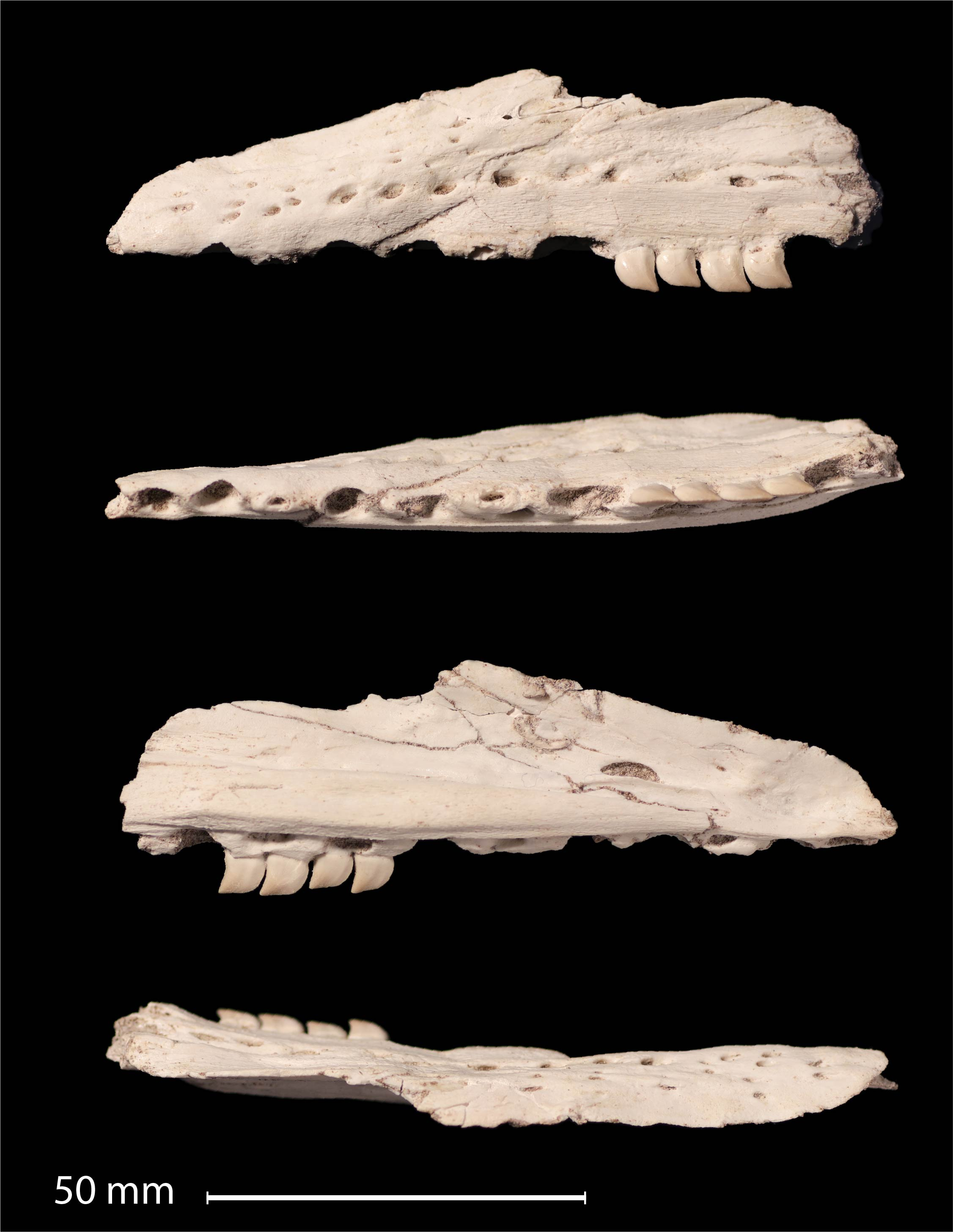
Maxilla of Xenodens

- Willman, Konishi & Caldwell described the new species Ectenosaurus everhartorum.
- Longrich et al. described the new species Pluridens serpentis.
- Longrich et al. described the new genus and species Xenodens calminechari.
- A yaguarasaurine mosasauroid is reported from the Cenomanian-Turonian beds of Coahuila (Mexico) by Jiménez-Huidobro et al. (2021), representing the earliest occurrence of a non-aigialosaur mosasauroid from North America reported to date.
- Redescription and a study on the geographic provenance of the fossil material of "Liodon" asiaticum is published by Bardet et al. (2021).
- One to seven month-long life histories of specimens of Platecarpus tympaniticus and Clidastes propython collected from chalk deposits of the Western Interior Seaway and Mississippi Embayment in Kansas and Alabama are reconstructed by Travis Taylor et al. (2021), who interpret their findings as indicative of semi-regular travels of these mosasaurs from marine to freshwater coastal environments and consumption of freshwater.
- First confirmed non-dental mosasaur remains from the Maastrichtian Breien Member of the Hell Creek Formation (North Dakota, United States) are described by Van Vranken & Boyd (2021).

==== 2022 ====
- A study on the diversification of feeding and locomotory strategies of mosasauroids is published by Cross et al. (2022).
- A study on the evolution of morphofunctional diversity of mosasaurids prior to the Cretaceous–Paleogene extinction event is published by MacLaren et al. (2022), who interpret their findings as indicating that taxonomic turnover in mosasaurid community composition from Campanian to Maastrichtian was reflected by a notable global increase in morphofunctional diversity, and that mosasaurid morphofunctional diversity was in decline in multiple provincial communities in the Late Maastrichtian before the Cretaceous–Paleogene mass extinction.
- A study on the individual age and life history of a halisaurine mosasaur known from a cervical vertebra from the Late Cretaceous (Campanian) Beloe Ozero locality (Saratov Oblast, Russia) is published by Grigoriev et al. (2022).
- The first occurrences of Mosasaurus hoffmannii are reported from the Ouled Abdoun Basin (Morocco) by Rempert et al. (2022), extending the known range of this species.
- An anatomical review of South African mosasaurs by Woolley et al. (2022) with reclassification of T. capensis, originally assigned to Tylosaurus and later to Taniwhasaurus, as a chimera of two different mosasaur genera (cf. Prognathodon and cf. Taniwhasaurus), but not identifiable at the species level.

== See also ==
- Timeline of ichthyosaur research
- Timeline of plesiosaur research
