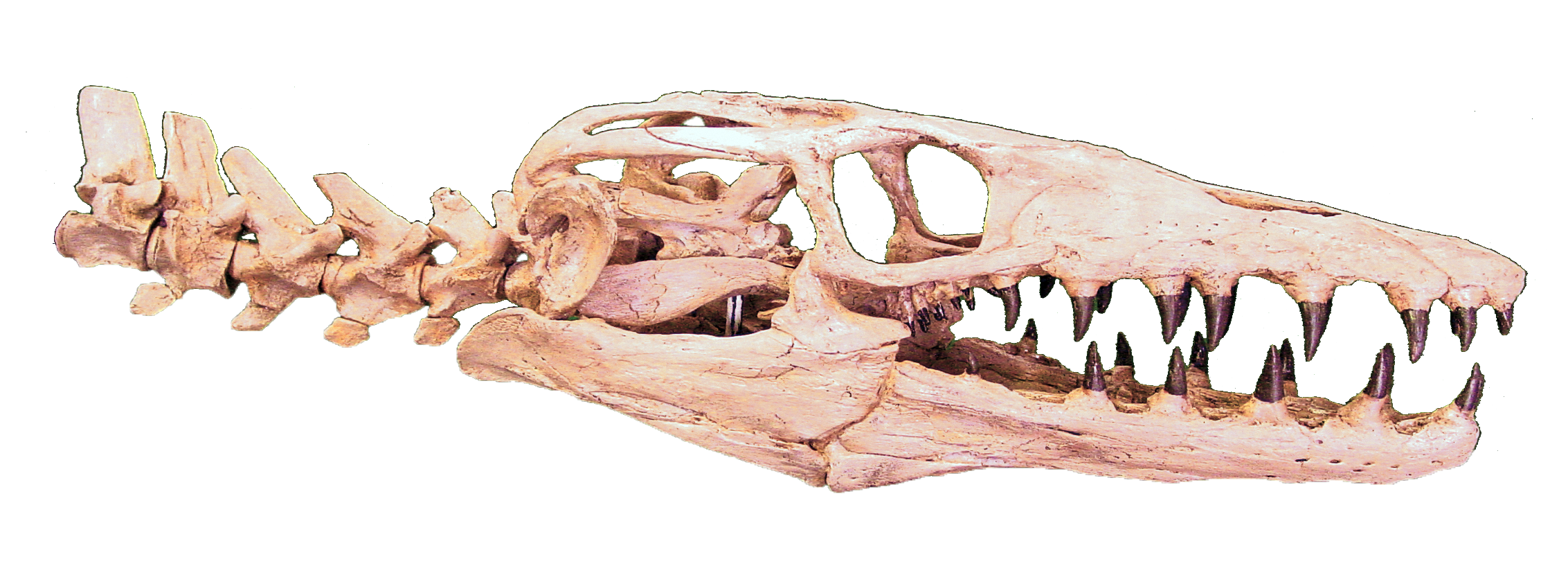
- Selmasaurus johnsoni mounted skull in the Rocky Mountain Dinosaur Resource Center in Woodland Park, Colorado.

Scientific classification
- Kingdom: Animalia
- Phylum: Chordata
- Class: Reptilia
- Order: Squamata
- Clade: †Mosasauria
- Family: †Mosasauridae
- Clade: †Russellosaurina
- Clade: †Selmasaurini
- Genus: †Selmasaurus; Wright & Shannon, 1988

Species
- †S. russelli Wright & Shannon, 1988 (type); †S. johnsoni Polcyn & Everhart, 2008

= Selmasaurus =

Selmasaurus Temporal range: Late Cretaceous, Santonian–Campanian 86.3–80.5 Ma

Extinct genus of mosasaurids

Selmasaurus is an extinct genus of marine lizard belonging to the mosasaur family. It is classified as part of the Plioplatecarpinae subfamily alongside genera like Angolasaurus and Platecarpus. Two species are known, S. russelli and S. johnsoni; both are exclusively known from Santonian deposits in the United States. Fragmentary mosasaur fossils from the Campanian of Sweden have also been referred to Selmasaurus.

Selmasaurus is unique among the mosasaurs in that its skull is unusually akinetic, meaning that it is incapable of widening to swallow larger prey. Most mosasaurs have skulls which possess "coupled kinesis" (mesokinesis and streptostyly), that is, parts of the jaw can open widely to accommodate large prey.

== History of discovery ==
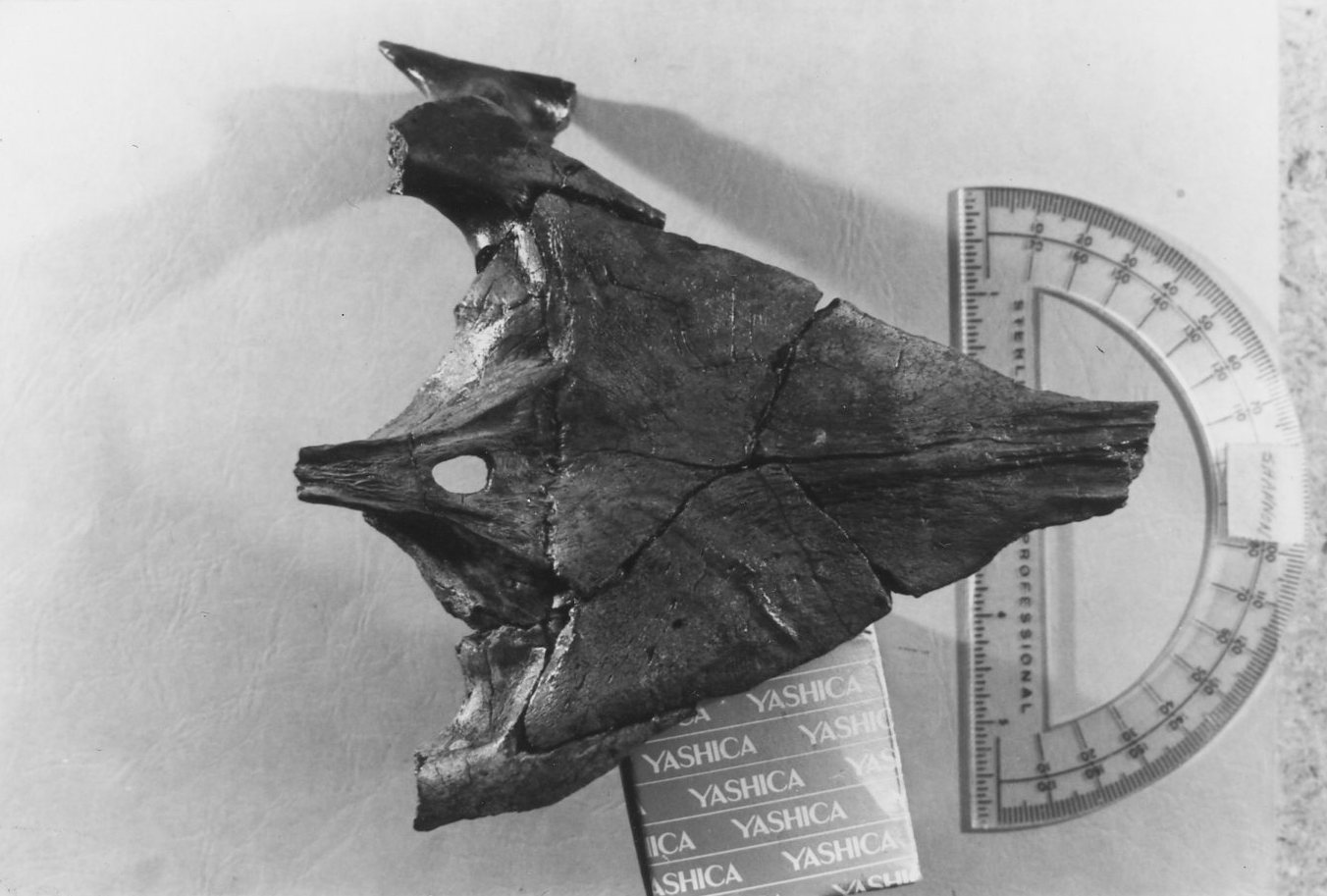
Skull roof of the S. russelli holotype specimen GSATC 221, showing frontal, parietal, postorbitofrontals, and left jugal. Dorsal view.

First recognized by geologist Samuel Wayne Shannon in his 1975 Master's thesis, "Selected Alabama Mosasaurs", the taxon remained a nomen nudum until it was officially described in 1988 in an article coauthored by Wright. The type specimen, formerly reposited at the Geological Survey of Alabama and cataloged as GSATC 221, was transferred in 2005 to the Alabama Museum of Natural History (Tuscaloosa). The holotype of this genus consists of a very well preserved but incomplete and disarticulated skull, the left atlantal neural arch, atlas centrum, and a single neural arch from a cervical vertebra. Preserved skull elements include the frontal, parietal, left ectopterygoid, left jugal, supratemporals, basioccipital and basisphenoid, and quadrates. The species was named in honor of paleontologist Dale A. Russell, for his extensive work on mosasaurs. The holotype and only known specimen of S. russelli was collected from an unknown location in western Alabama, and for decades, uncertainty surrounded the precise stratigraphic horizon from which the specimen had been recovered. Then in 1998, Caitlín R. Kiernan extracted chalky matrix from the basilar canal of the basioccipital and identified calcareous nanoplankton that indicated GSATC 221 had originated from basal Campanian beds within the lower unnamed member of the Mooreville Chalk Formation (Selma Group). In her study of Alabama mosasaur biostratigraphy, Kiernan placed S. russelli within the Clidastes Acme Zone, though it was the rarest element in the fauna, accounting for only 0.3% of the biozone's assemblage (one specimen).

A remarkably well preserved and nearly complete Selmasaurus skull and partial postcranial skeleton was discovered by Steve Johnson and family in 1996, from the Santonian or Campanian marine horizon in the Niobrara Formation of Niobrara Chalk, western Kansas. Recovered in 1997 and donated to the Sternberg Museum of Natural History in Hays, Kansas, in 2001, the remains were determined to be a new species of Selmasaurus in 2008 after over a decade of study by Polcyn and Everhart. Named S. johnsoni after its discoverer, the skull is one of the most complete mosasaur skulls recovered and thus provides new anatomical information for Selmasaurus, a better understanding of plioplatecarpine ingroup relationships, extends the geographic and temporal range of the genus, and documents further diversity within Plioplatecarpinae. The holotype and the only known specimen is housed at the Sternberg Museum of Natural History under catalog number FHSM-VP-13910.

== Description ==
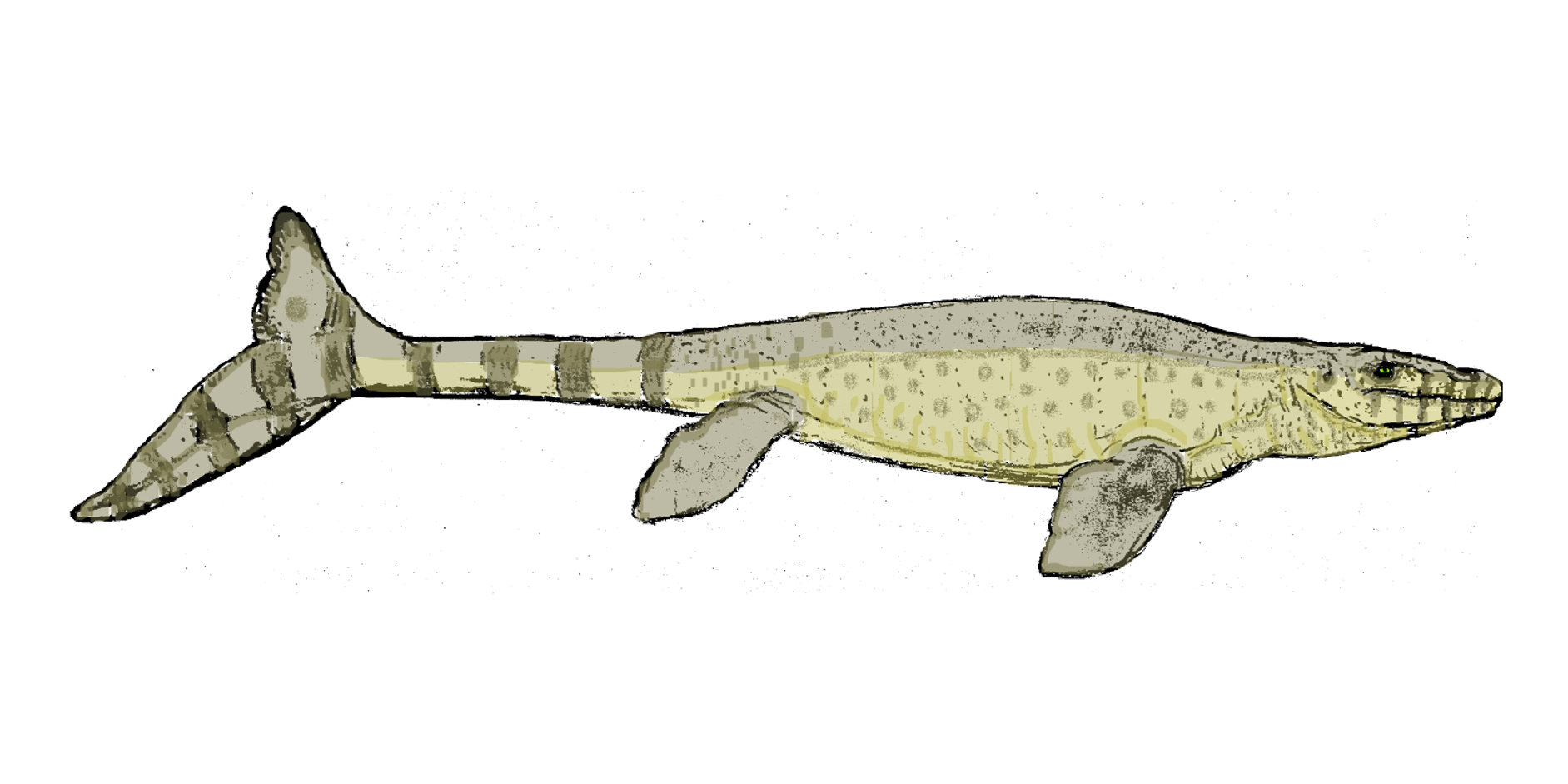
Life restoration

Selmasaurus was a small predatory mosasaur at approximately 3–5 meters in length. It possesses a relatively low number of teeth for a mosasaur, the lowest of any known species at the time of its discovery. Originally classified as a plioplatecarpine mosasaur, it differs from all other plioplatecarpine mosasaurs in several respects, listed below as stated by Polcyn and Everhart (2008):

Suprastapedial process descends to about half the quadrate height, and is in contact with but not fused to the peg-like infrastapedial process; elongate medially constricted, subrectangular parietal table, broadening anteriorally and constricting posteriorly forming narrow parasagittal ridges that diverge at their terminus; posteroventral median process of parietal meets supraoccipital in narrow elongate contact; anteromedial process of supratemporal clasped by medial excavations of the parietal rami for nearly entire length of rami; canals for the basilar arteries enter the basioccipital as two small foramina separated by a median septum, diverge within the basioccipital and cross the basisphenoid suture in a lateral and deeply ventral position.

== Classification ==
Wright and Shannon classified Selmasaurus as a member of the mosasaur subfamily Plioplatecarpinae, which also includes the genera Platecarpus, Plioplatecarpus, and Ectenosaurus, largely on the "basis of the mode of circulation through the basicarnium." The genus may be most closely related to Ectenosaurus, though it possesses a much shorter, stouter skull. Additional specimens would greatly expand our understanding of Selmasaurus russelli.

The cladogram below follows the most resolved topology from a 2011 phylogenetic analysis of the Plioplatecarpinae by paleontologists Takuya Konishi and Michael W. Caldwell.

- - Clidastes propython
  - - Kourisodon puntledgensis
    - Russellosaurina
      - - Yaguarasaurus columbianus
        - - Russellosaurus coheni
          - Tethysaurus nopcsai
      - - - Tylosaurus kansasensis
          - Tylosaurus proriger
        - Plioplatecarpinae
          - Ectenosaurus clidastoides
          - - Angolasaurus bocagei
            - - - Selmasaurus johnsoni
                - Selmasaurus russelli
              - - Plesioplatecarpus planifrons
                - - Platecarpus tympaniticus
                  - - Latoplatecarpus willistoni
                    - - - Latoplatecarpus nichollsae
                        - "Platecarpus somenensis"
                      - - Plioplatecarpus primaevus
                        - - Plioplatecarpus houzeaui
                          - Plioplatecarpus marshi

In their 2024 description of the Moroccan plioplatecarpine Khinjaria, Longrich et al. used phylogenetic analyses to recover it within a monophyletic clade of non-plioplatecarpin plioplatecarpine mosasaurids. They named this clade—also containing Gavialimimus, Goronyosaurus, and Selmasaurus—the Selmasaurini. Selmasaurus johnsoni, which is older and may be more primitive, was found in a more basal position than S. russelli. The results of their analyses are shown in the cladogram below:

- - Tethysaurus
  - Plioplatecarpinae
    - Russellosaurus
    - - Yaguarasaurus columbianus
      - - Carlile Formation plioplatecarpine
        - - Yaguarasaurus regiomontanus
          - - Ectenosaurus spp.
            - - Angolasaurus
              - - Plioplatecarpini
                - Selmasaurini
                  - Selmasaurus johnsoni
                  - - Selmasaurus russelli
                    - - Gavialimimus
                      - - Goronyosaurus
                        - Khinjaria

== Palaeoecology ==
According to stable isotope analysis, S. johnsoni was one of the few plioplatecarpines that was not restricted to nearshore marine environments.
