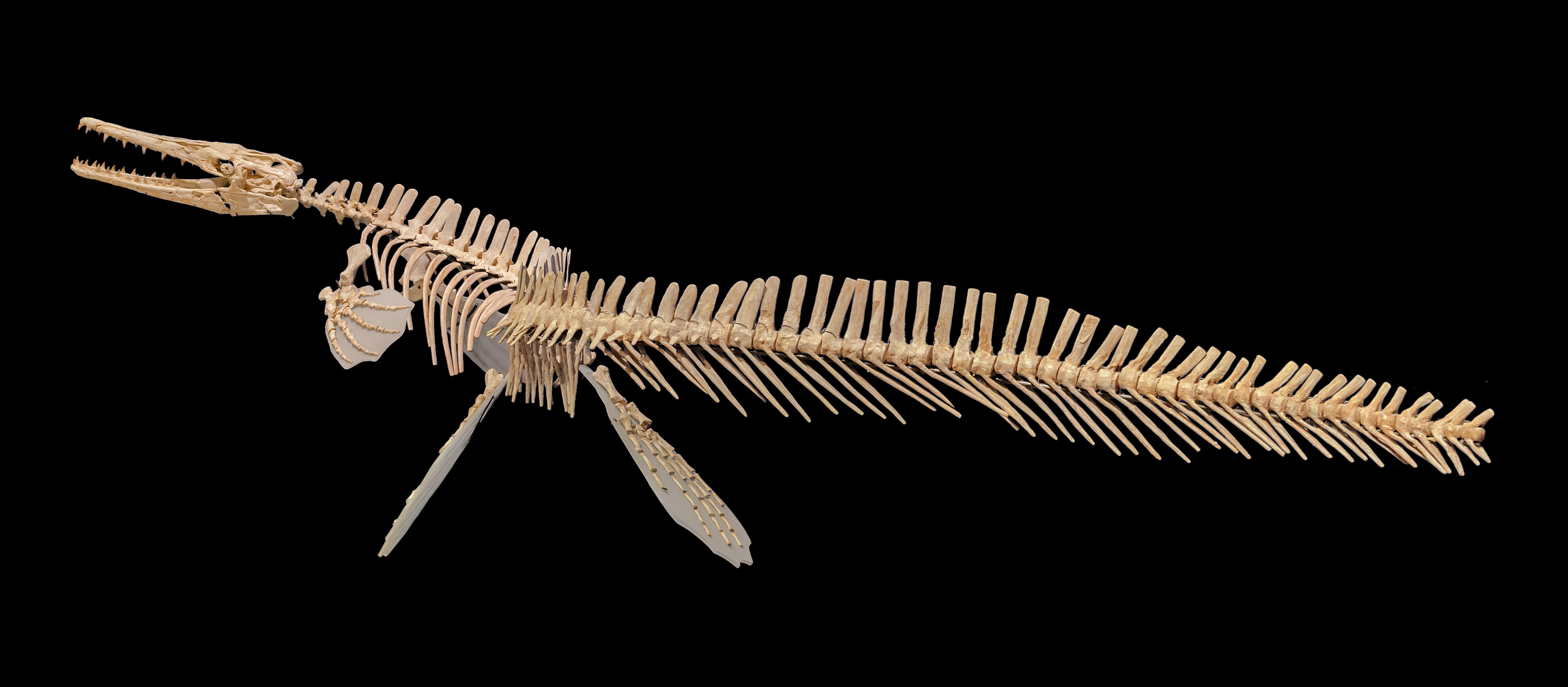
- Reconstructed skeleton of an indeterminate Moroccan plioplatecarpine, possibly a specimen of Gavialimimus

Scientific classification
- Kingdom: Animalia
- Phylum: Chordata
- Class: Reptilia
- Order: Squamata
- Clade: †Mosasauria
- Family: †Mosasauridae
- Clade: †Russellosaurina
- Clade: †Selmasaurini
- Genus: †Gavialimimus; Strong et al., 2020

Type species
- †Gavialimimus almaghribensis Strong et al., 2020

Synonyms
- Platecarpus ptychodon? Arambourg, 1952; Gavialimimus ptychodon? (Arambourg, 1952)

= Gavialimimus =

Gavialimimus Temporal range: Late Cretaceous, Maastrichtian

Extinct genus of lizards

Gavialimimus is an extinct genus of plioplatecarpine mosasaur from the Maastrichtian of Morocco and possibly Angola.

== Discovery and naming ==
In 2020, Strong and colleagues named a new genus of plioplatecarpine mosasaur Gavialimimus based on the specimen MHNM.KHG.1231, an articulated skull and associated fragmentary postcrania found in the Ouled Abdoun Basin, which was designated as the holotype. The etymology of this genus means "gharial mimic" (Gavial = "gharial" + Greek mimus = "mimic"), referring to morphological convergence between Gavialimimus and the extant gharial (Gavialis gangeticus). The specific name almaghribensis references al-Maghrib, the type locality of Gavialimimus. In 2022, Longrich and colleagues reported various marine vertebrate remains with signs of acid damage including a rostrum assigned to G. almaghribensis (MHNM.KHG.519) found in close vicinity to Thalassotitan, suggesting that these fossils are digested by the stomach acid of a large mosasaur like Thalassotitan.

In 2023, Polcyn, Schulp and Gonçalves described the gut contents of a 6.5–7 metres (21–23 ft) long mosasaur specimen identified as Prognathodon kianda (MGUAN PA183) from Angola, which preserved three species of mosasaurs: a 4 metres (13 ft) long specimen of Gavialimimus sp. (MGUAN PA183B), a small individual of P. kianda (MGUAN PA183C) and a new taxon Bentiabasaurus (MGUAN PA183D). The size of Gavialimimus sp. was about 57% the size of P. kianda, and most of the gut contents of P. kianda were cranial material, suggesting that Prognathodon preferred to consume the head portion of other mosasaurs including relatively large taxa and its own kind.

=== Synonymy with "Platecarpus" ptychodon ===
"Platecarpus" ptychodon is another plioplatecarpine mosasaur from the same locality, which was described by Camille Arambourg in 1952 based on an isolated tooth MNHN PMC 30 and other referred specimens (MNHN PMC 31–34 and MNHN PMC 53). Other specimens were referred to "P." ptychodon including a tooth specimen (OCP DEK/GE 661, formerly OCP-SA 661) and a more complete skull (OCP DEK/GE 304, formerly OCP-SA 304), which led Bardet et al. (2015) to recognize that "P." ptychodon is not a species of Platecarpus, though no taxonomic revisions were made.

Although Strong et al. (2020) acknowledged the similarity between the fragmentary holotype tooth of "P." ptychodon and the holotype of G. almaghribensis, they considered "P." ptychodon to be a dubious, undiagnostic taxon. In a comprehensive 2025 study of mosasaur teeth from the Maastrichtian of Morocco, Bardet and colleagues found the type specimen of "P." ptychodon to be diagnostic and distinct from teeth of all other mosasaurid species except for G. almaghribensis. Thus, they considered "P." ptychodon to be a senior synonym of G. almaghribensis, proposing the new combination G. ptychodon.

Bardet et al. (2025) also mentioned unpublished specimens and assigned OCP DEK/GE 356 and OCP DEK/GE 560 to their proposed combination. They also referred a vertebra (OCP DEK/GE 476), which was previously assigned to another extinct marine squamate Pachyvaranus from the same locality.

== Description ==
Gavialimimus is a medium-sized mosasaur, with an estimated body length of 6 metres (20 ft). Gavialimimus likely occupied the niche of a large piscivore, indicating that it managed to co-exist with several other large mosasaur species in the same area through severe specialization. Some specimens suggest that larger prognathodontine mosasaurs preyed upon Gavialimimus.

== Classification ==
In their 2024 description of the Moroccan plioplatecarpine Khinjaria, Longrich et al. used phylogenetic analyses to recover it within a clade of non-plioplatecarpin plioplatecarpine mosasaurids. They named this clade—also containing Gavialimimus, Goronyosaurus and Selmasaurus—the Selmasaurini. A similar clade was recovered by Strong et al. (2020) in their description of Gavialimimus. The results of the analyses of Longrich et al. are shown in the cladogram below:

- - Tethysaurus
  - Plioplatecarpinae
    - Russellosaurus
    - - Yaguarasaurus columbianus
      - - Carlile Formation plioplatecarpine
        - - Yaguarasaurus regiomontanus
          - - Ectenosaurus spp.
            - - Angolasaurus
              - - Plioplatecarpini
                - Selmasaurini
                  - Selmasaurus johnsoni
                  - - Selmasaurus russelli
                    - - Gavialimimus
                      - - Goronyosaurus
                        - Khinjaria
