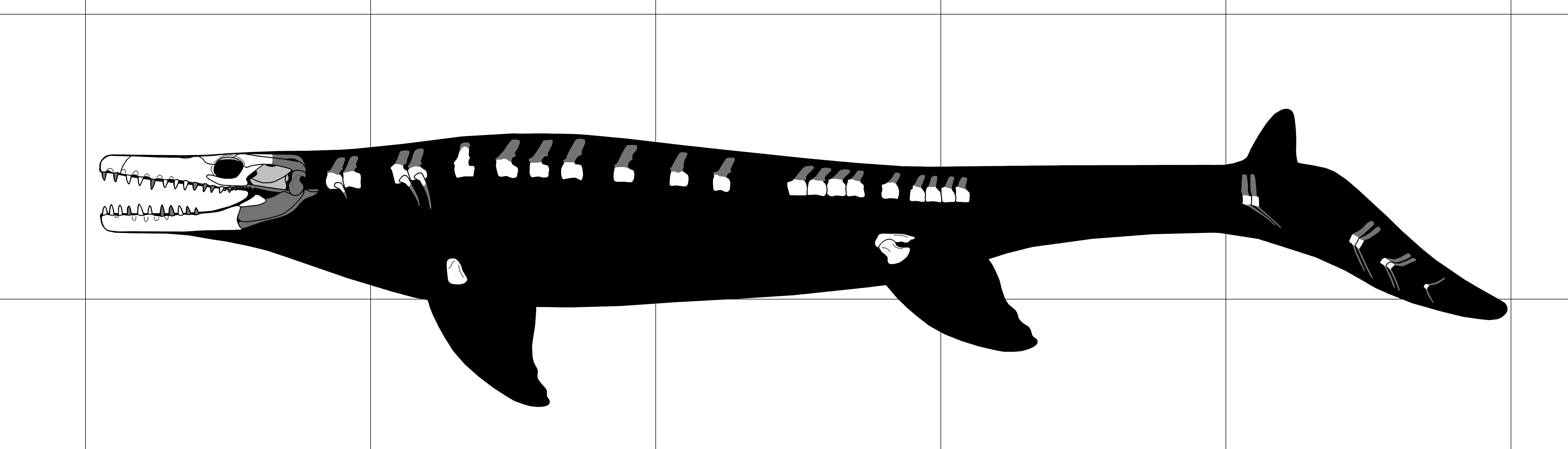
- Diagram of Goronyosaurus, reconstructed as a mosasaurine, based on known fossils.

Scientific classification
- Kingdom: Animalia
- Phylum: Chordata
- Class: Reptilia
- Order: Squamata
- Clade: †Mosasauria
- Family: †Mosasauridae
- Clade: †Russellosaurina
- Clade: †Selmasaurini
- Genus: †Goronyosaurus; Azzaroli et al., 1972
- Species: †G. nigeriensis

Binomial name
- †Goronyosaurus nigeriensis (Swinton et al., 1930)

Synonyms
- Mosasaurus nigeriensis (Swinton et al., 1930)

= Goronyosaurus =

Goronyosaurus Temporal range: Maastrichtian

Extinct genus of lizards

Goronyosaurus is an extinct genus of marine lizard belonging to the mosasaur family. Fossils of Goronyosaurus are exclusively known from the Late Maastrichtian of the Iullemmeden Basin in West Africa, specifically the Dukamaje Formation of Niger and Nigeria and Farin Doutchi Formation of Niger. The type specimen was first described in 1930 as Mosasaurus nigeriensis, but subsequent remains revealed a highly unique set of adaptations that prompted the species to be reclassified as the only species of the new genus Goronyosaurus in 1972. These unique adaptations have made Goronyosaurus notoriously difficult to classify within the Mosasauridae and it is often left out of phylogenetic analyses, although most authors agree that Goronyosaurus belonged to Mosasauridae.

Goronyosaurus possesses unique teeth, which are unlike the teeth of any other mosasaur. Instead of the cutting teeth common among mosasaurs, Goronyosaurus has straight teeth with rounded apices adapted for smashing food.

== Discovery and naming ==
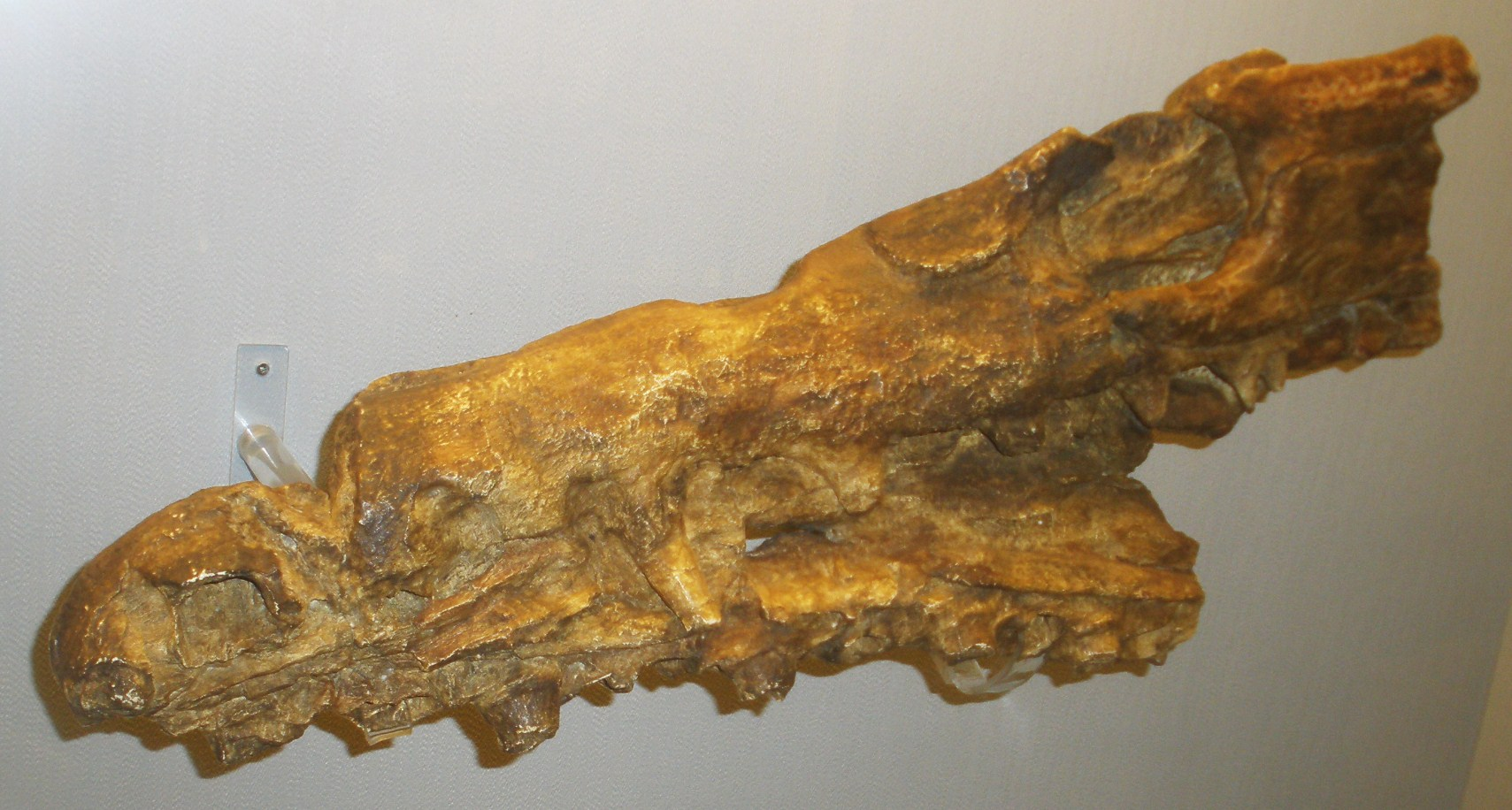
Skull of IGF 14750 at the Florence Museum of Natural History

The type specimen (Note: Chosen as the lectotype by Halstead in 1982; Lingham-Soliar (1991) mistakenly identified IGF 14750 as the holotype.) of Goronyosaurus, BMNH R 5674 consisting of two vertebrae, was found within a section of the Dukamaje Formation called the "Mosasaurus shales" in northwestern Nigeria and was noted by Franz von Nopcsa in 1925, but he gave no species or genus name, and these remains were described more completely by Swinton et al. in 1930. The holotype material included only isolated vertebrae, a single femur, mandible fragments and teeth which Swinton et al. described and named as the new species Mosasaurus nigeriensis. Later from 1969-1971, two Italian expeditions into same locality sponsored by the National Research Council and National Lincean Academy respectively recovered additional material cataloged as IGF 14750. This included more vertebrae, a partial humerus, a partial pelvis, and a nearly complete skull lacking the rear of the cranium and parts of the mandible. Because of the material being found in the same horizon of the same region of Nigeria, and the similarities in size and anatomy, these new specimens were referred to M. nigeriensis by Augusto Azzaroli and his colleagues.

Description of IGF 14750 demonstrated significant differences of the Nigerian fossils from Mosasaurus. As such, Azzaroli et al. named a new genus Goronyosaurus. The generic name recognizes the Goronyo District of Nigeria, where the material was found. With no knowledge on the whereabouts or status of BMNH R 5674, the authors designated IGF 14750 as the taxon's replacement neotype. The specimen was later reassigned as referred material following the reemergence of the original type fossils in literature. A second, unnamed species, from the Farin Doutchi Formation in Niger was reported on by Lingham-Soliar (1991).

== Description ==
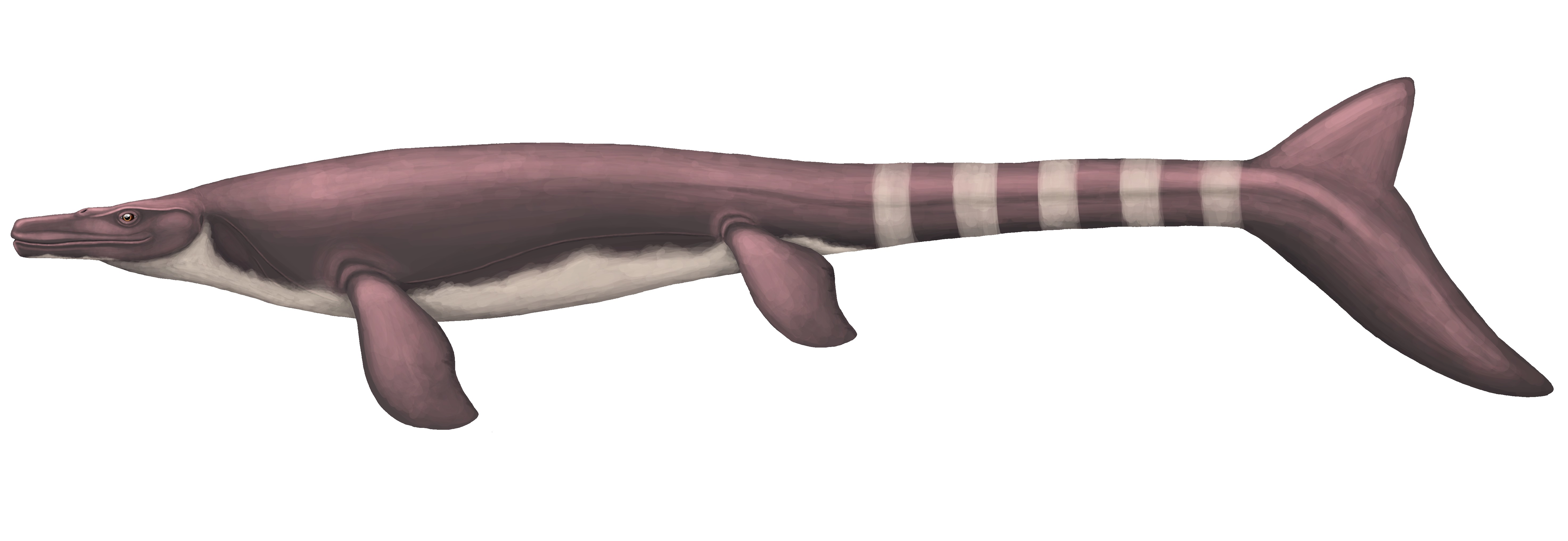
Life restoration of Goronyosaurus as a plioplatecarpine

Size compared to a human as a mosasaurine

Goronyosaurus is a small mosasaur, measuring up to 5.14 m (16.9 ft) long. Previously the body length had been estimated at 7.8 m (26 ft), although Soliar (1988) identified that this length estimate was based on a false skull length to body length ratio (9.1:100). Based on the skull length to body length ratio of Tylosaurus (13.8:100), Soliar (1988) derived a body length estimate of 5.14 m (16.9 ft) from a 0.71 m (2.3 ft) long skull.

=== Skull ===
Most of the skull of Goronyosaurus is preserved in the material, although it is heavily crushed and distorted. Overall the skull is long and narrow compared to other mosasaurids, with an estimated complete length of 71 cm (28 in) and a width of only 11.2 cm (4.4 in). Its skull length to skull width ratio (6.31:1) is most similar to Tylosaurus nepaeolicus (6.18:1) among other mosasaurs, followed by Plesiotylosaurus (5.64:1) and Tylosaurus proriger (5.3:1).

The snout bones of the premaxilla, maxilla and nasals are distorted and flattened laterally. The premaxilae bear strong teeth, with the anterior most tooth being placed directly behind the beginning of the snout. Large nerve foramina are placed close to the dorsal surface of the paired premaxilae. The maxillae bones are unusual for mosasaurids, as they bear teeth which extend posterior to the front of the orbit. It is uncertain exactly how many teeth there were in the maxilla due to breakage, but there is probably around eleven. The narial bar, the combined rear processes of the premaxillae which project between the external nares, is very robust. They are approximately the same width for the entire length, and have a rugged surface, similar to tylosaurines. The nasal openings themselves are relatively small and posterior in Goronyosaurus.

Discussions of the jugal bone were presented significantly in Soliar (1988), due to the supposed morphology that was completely unlike any in known mosasaurs. Azzaroli et al. (1972) proposed that Goronyosaurus has an extremely long and tall jugal, which directly contrasts with the thin slender bones of other lepidosaurs. The functional implications proposed by Azzaroli were disregarded by Soliar in 1988, due to there being no precedent for such a mechanical adaptation. The identity of the jugals was doubted by Halstead & Middleton (1982), and Soliar (1988) instead proposed that the "jugal" of Azzaroli et al. was instead a taphonomic combination of the jugal and coronoid process of the mandible. As such, the true jugal would be only around 19 mm (0.75 in) thick across a majority of its structure, similar in anatomy to Liodon.

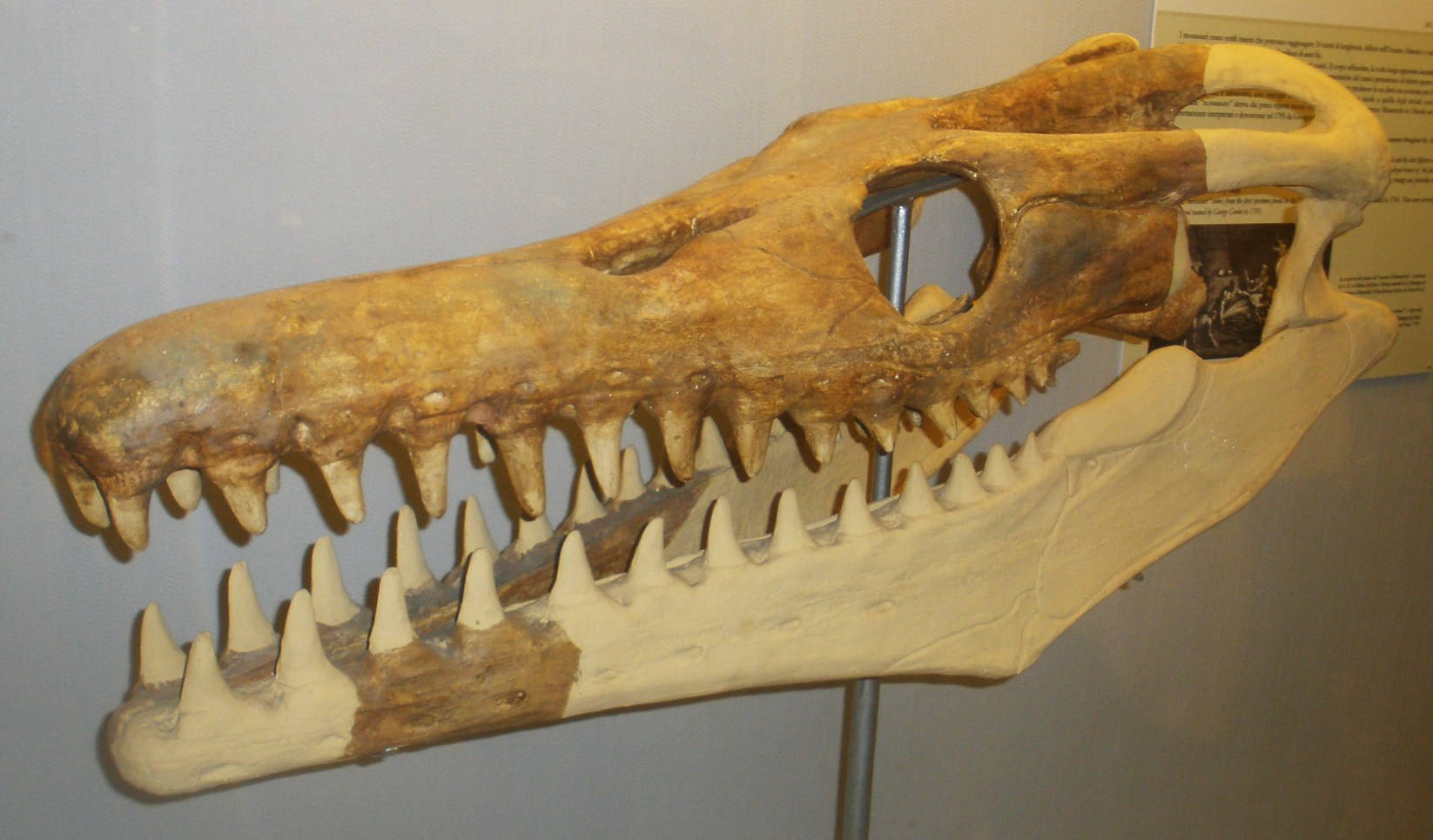
Outdated restored skull based on Azzaroli et al. (1975)

Much of the posterior skull has been crushed or broken away from the holotype. The strongly built parietals are very narrow, and are broken, although the articulation with the frontal was probably very intricate. The frontals are triangular, and articulate with the internarial bar strongly. The prefrontals are very crushed and distorted out of their original articulation, but were positioned like Tylosaurus in life. The prefrontals exclude the frontals from participating in the orbit.

The pterygoid bone of the palate is preserved, and bears teeth like in other mosasaurs. The two main processes of the pterygoid are broken, because of their long and slender shape, but it probable looked similar to related taxa. The process of the pterygoid that articulates with the ectopterygoid is similar to Tylosaurus, being flattened vertically and strongly forked.

Generally the occipital unit of Goronyosaurus is poorly preserved. The unit is narrow, and has tylosaurine features, as well as a unique morphology of the supraoccipital bone. Unlike on other taxa where the supraoccipital is flattened, in Goronyosaurus it has a distinct groove across its midline. The sides of the basisphenoid are unusually steep, and the vidian canal is uncovered, probably due to breakage of the thin sheet of bone that normally covers it. These features have been compared favourably to those in Plioplatecarpus, while the elongation and slenderness are similar more so to Tylosaurus.

==== Dentition ====
Many isolated teeth found throughout Cretaceous Nigeria can be assigned to Goronyosaurus, because of its unique tooth anatomy. Such isolated teeth display a similar polymorphic tapering, with crowns that become blunter towards the back of the tooth row. These fit the morphology of Goronyosaurus to the exclusion of all other mosasaurs, except in the fact that such isolated teeth lack the fluted grooves of Goronyosaurus. Teeth from the front of the dentary are slightly more robust than those more posterior, but still curve gently back. Centralized teeth have very blunt cutting edges, with enamel between 150–250 μm that has varying thickness while remaining shallow.

=== Axial skeleton ===
Although the first two cervical vertebrae are unknown, several others from along the neck have been preserved. The neural spines are robust and the zygapophyses are well developed, but the articulation of the neural arch between vertebrae is not present. The processes that articulate with cervical ribs become stronger towards the back of the neck. Multiple dorsal vertebrae are known from along the back. Their centra begin as cylindrical, but become flattened closer to the pelvis. No neural arches are preserved in any dorsal vertebrae. Zygapophyses are weakly present, unlike in the cervical vertebrae, but the inter-arch articulations are still absent. The transverse processes are directed slightly anteriorly and dorsally, and become less pronounced towards the pelvis.

== Classification ==
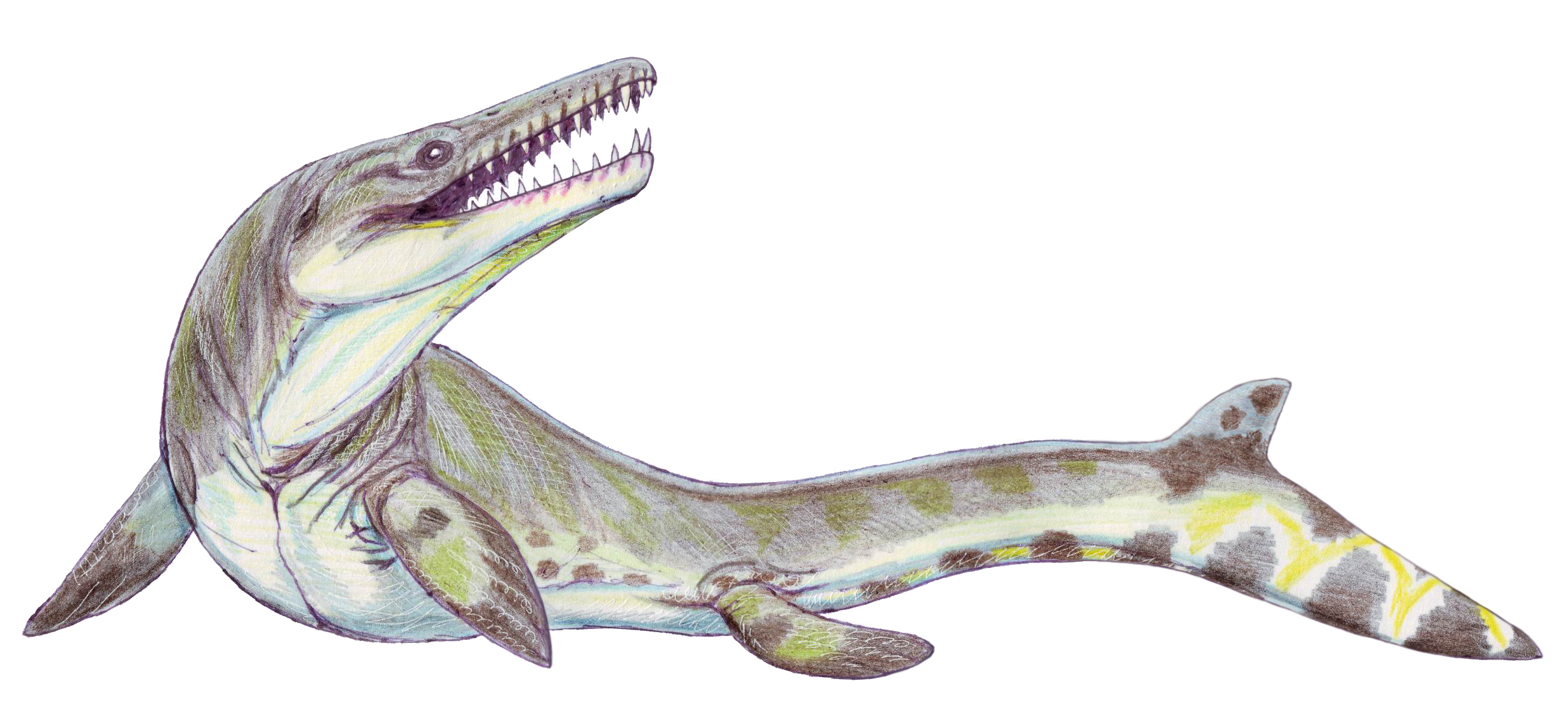
Restoration as a tylosaurine

Due to its unique characteristics and features, Goronyosaurus is notoriously difficult to classify and is left out of most phylogenetic analyses. Goronyosaurus was originally named within its own subfamily, Goronyosaurinae. However, this was based on the characters of the jugal now known to be incorrect. Lingham-Soliar found that Goronyosaurus was within Tylosaurinae in 1988, based on a phylogeny of cranial-only characters. Mosasaurinae was collapsed into a single unit, so relationships of Goronyosaurus within it were not tested. A placement within the Tylosaurinae is not necessarily correct however, as the genus was found as forming a clade with the genera Prognathodon, Plesiotylosaurus and Ectenosaurus, which would place it within the Mosasaurinae, in a comprehensive 2010 analysis of the Anguimorpha. The results from their analysis of morphology-only characters in extinct and extant taxa is shown below, collapsed to only display Mosasauridae. The placements of Prognathodontini and Mosasaurini follow Russell (1967).

- Mosasauridae
  - Halisaurinae
  - - Russellosaurina
      - Plioplatecarpus primaevus
      - - Platecarpus tympaniticus
        - Tylosaurinae
          - - Lakumasaurus antarcticus
            - Taniwhasaurus oweni
          - Tylosaurus proriger
          - - Tylosaurus nepaeolicus
            - Hainosaurus bernardi
    - Mosasaurinae
      - Prognathodontini
        - - Ectenosaurus clidastoides
          - Goronyosaurus nigeriensis
        - - Plesiotylosaurus crassidens
          - - Prognathodon solvayi
            - Prognathodon overtoni
      - Mosasaurini
        - Clidastes liodontus
        - - Globidens alabamaensis
          - - Mosasaurus hoffmanni
            - - Mosasaurus lemonnieri
              - - Moanasaurus mangahouangae
                - - Plotosaurus bennisoni
                  - Plotosaurus tuckeri

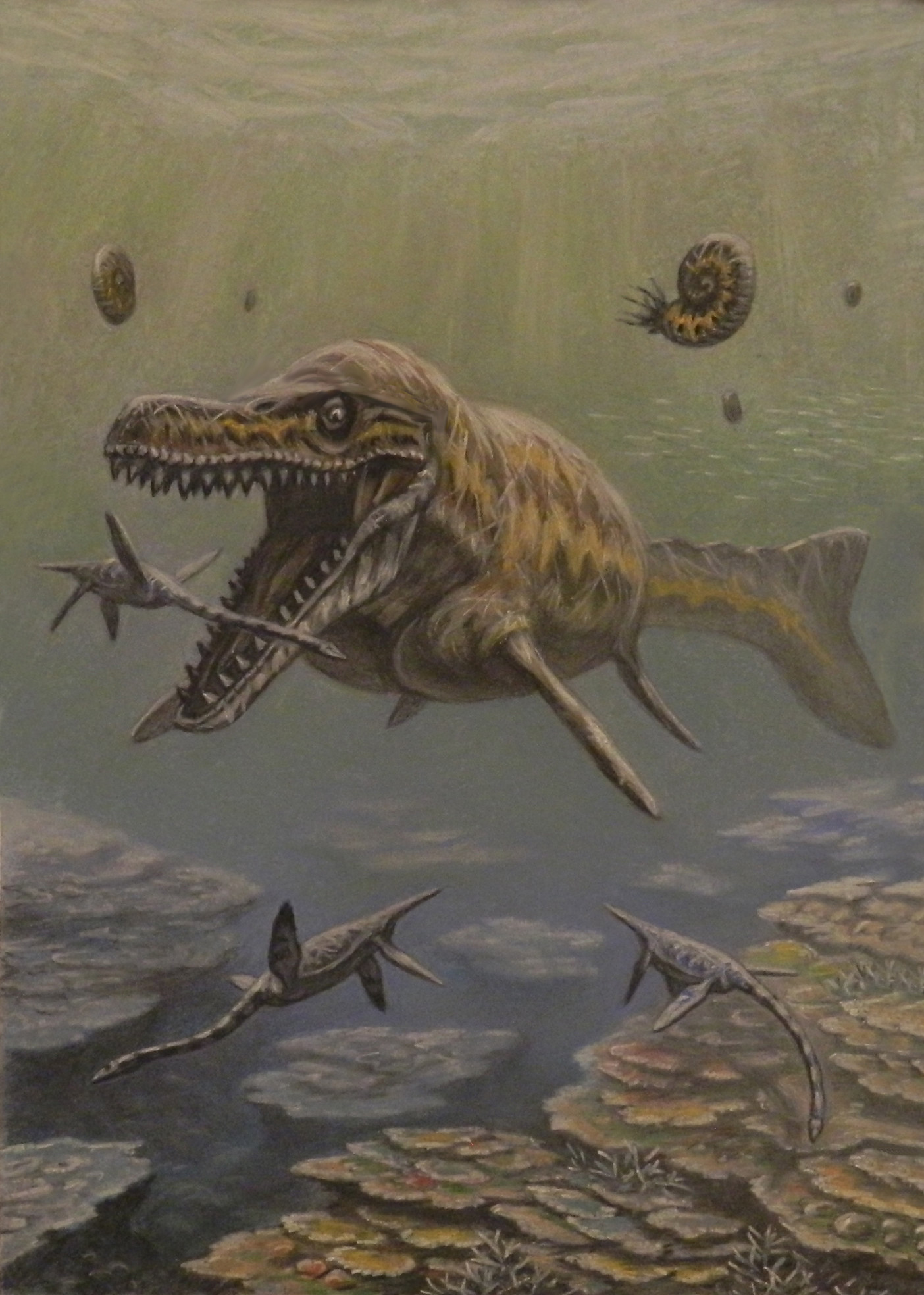
Goronyosaurus hunting juvenile plesiosaurs

The clade of Goronyosaurus and Prognathodon, and the other branch with Mosasaurini, were found to be grouped by two unique (unambiguous) features, the lack of frontal bone bordering the nasal opening, and a humerus with a hooked process behind the glenoid cavity. An earlier version of the 2010 analysis found a more typical phylogeny of mosasaurs, with Goronyosaurus closest to Plotosaurus in derived Mosasaurinae, and the clade Plioplatecarpinae resolved, including Ectenosaurus and Prognathodon (the latter typically a mosasaurine). A clade of Goronyosaurus and Plotosaurus was diagnosed by the presence of teeth to the very front of the premaxilla, extension of the tooth row below and behind the orbit, frontally contacting the maxillae, the unforked shape of the contact between skull roof and supratemporal arch bones, location of the vidian canal opening moved posteriorly, absence of zygapophyseal articulations in vertebrae, and complete separation of the deltoid anc pectoral muscle crests on the humerus.

In 2020, Strong et al. assigned Goronyosarus to the Plioplatecarpinae in a clade containing Angolasaurus and Selmasaurus. A plioplatecarpine assignment was also supported by Zietlow, Boyd & van Vranken in their 2023 description of the mosasaurine Jormungandr.

In their 2024 description of the Moroccan plioplatecarpine Khinjaria, Longrich et al. used phylogenetic analyses to recover it within a monophyletic clade of non-plioplatecarpin plioplatecarpine mosasaurids, as the sister taxon to Goronyosaurus. They named this clade—also containing Gavialimimus and Selmasaurus—the Selmasaurini. The results of their analyses are shown in the cladogram below:

- - Tethysaurus
  - Plioplatecarpinae
    - Russellosaurus
    - - Yaguarasaurus columbianus
      - - Carlile Formation plioplatecarpine
        - - Yaguarasaurus regiomontanus
          - - Ectenosaurus spp.
            - - Angolasaurus
              - - Plioplatecarpini
                - Selmasaurini
                  - Selmasaurus johnsoni
                  - - Selmasaurus russelli
                    - - Gavialimimus
                      - - Goronyosaurus
                        - Khinjaria

== Paleobiology ==
=== Diet ===
Goronyosaurus has a unique tooth morphology among mosasaurs. Unlike a majority of mosasaurs, which have cutting teeth, Goronyosaurus has straight teeth with a rounded apex designed more for smashing food. This means that it may have competed with mosasaurs with cutting teeth, as well as large predatory crocodilians and plesiosaurs.

== Paleoecology ==
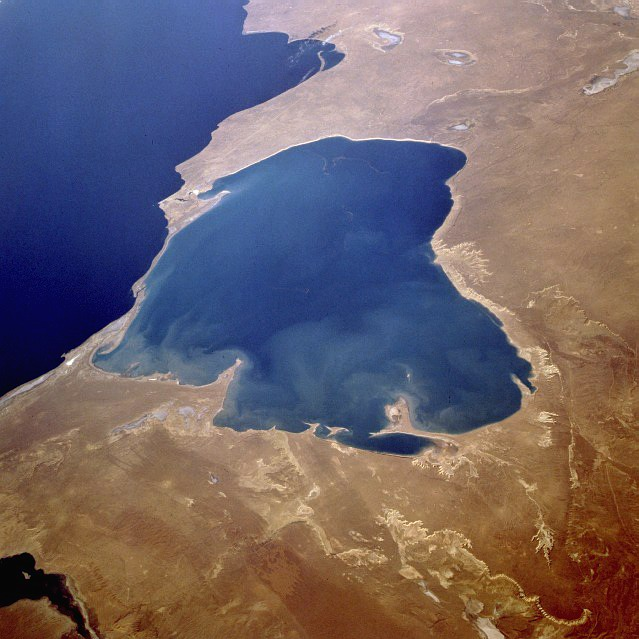
Goronyosaurus inhabited the coastal lagoon (left) and estuarine (right) environments of the Iullemmeden Basin.

All known Goronyosaurus fossils come from the Dukamaje and Farin Doutchi Formations of Niger and Nigeria, both of which lie within the Iullemmeden Basin. Precise dating both of deposits have proven difficult due to the absence of reliable index fossils, but geologists generally agree that the formations are at least Maastrichtian in age based on the occurrence of the ammonite Libycoceras. Some studies suggest the formations can be further constrained to the mid-late Maastrichtian (~70-66 million years ago) based on nannofossil assemblages.

The Iullemmeden Basin was partially submerged under the Trans-Saharan seaway, an inland sea that connected the Tethys Sea to the Gulf of Guinea during the Maastrichtian. The region of the basin that Goronyosaurus inhabited represented an insular flat coastal and estuarine environment characterized by lagoons and salt marshes. The Dukamaje Formation may have in particular represented a sabkha with alternating cycles of flooding and evaporation and influence from brackish water. These conditions probably created to a unique underwater setting that explains the bizarre adaptations of Goronyosaurus. The specialization towards a crocodile-like skull through an elongated and rigid tube-like build, straight conical interlocking teeth, and highly developed snout sensitivity and sense of smell was well-suited for pursuing prey in the environment's unique murky setting. Lingham-Soliar (1999) opined that Goronyosaurus represented an incipient stage towards a freshwater invasion of rivers, which would have been achieved had it not been for the Cretaceous–Paleogene extinction.
