= Khinjaria =

Khinjaria Temporal range: Late Cretaceous (late Maastrichtian)

Scientific classification
- Kingdom: Animalia
- Phylum: Chordata
- Class: Reptilia
- Order: Squamata
- Clade: †Mosasauria
- Family: †Mosasauridae
- Clade: †Russellosaurina
- Subfamily: †Plioplatecarpinae
- Clade: †Selmasaurini
- Genus: †Khinjaria
- Species: †K. acuta

Binomial name
- †Khinjaria acuta Longrich et al., 2024

Extinct genus of mosasaurs

Khinjaria (meaning "dagger") is an extinct genus of plioplatecarpine mosasaurid from the Late Cretaceous Ouled Abdoun Basin of Morocco. The genus contains a single species, K. acuta, known from a partial skull and vertebra. Khinjaria was likely an apex predator in its environment, as its large body size, blade-like teeth, and unusual skull morphology would have allowed it to attack large prey animals.

== Discovery and naming ==
The Khinjaria holotype specimen, MHNM.KHG.521, was discovered in sediments of the Oulad Abdoun Basin (Lower Couche III, Sidi Chennane locality) in Khouribga Province, Morocco. The specimen consists of a partial skull (with a partial premaxilla, both maxillae, the prefrontals, the frontal and parietal, right postorbitofrontal, partial right squamosal, and a dentary) and an associated vertebra, possibly coming from the trunk region.

In 2024, Longrich et al. described Khinjaria acuta as a new genus and species of plioplatecarpine mosasaur based on these fossil remains. The generic name, "Khinjaria", derives from an Arabic word for a dagger. The specific name, "acuta", means "sharp" in Latin. The full binomial name references the morphology of the teeth of Khinjaria.

Undescribed teeth potentially referable to Khinjaria have also been reported from the younger Upper Couche III in the Sidi Chennane locality.

== Description ==
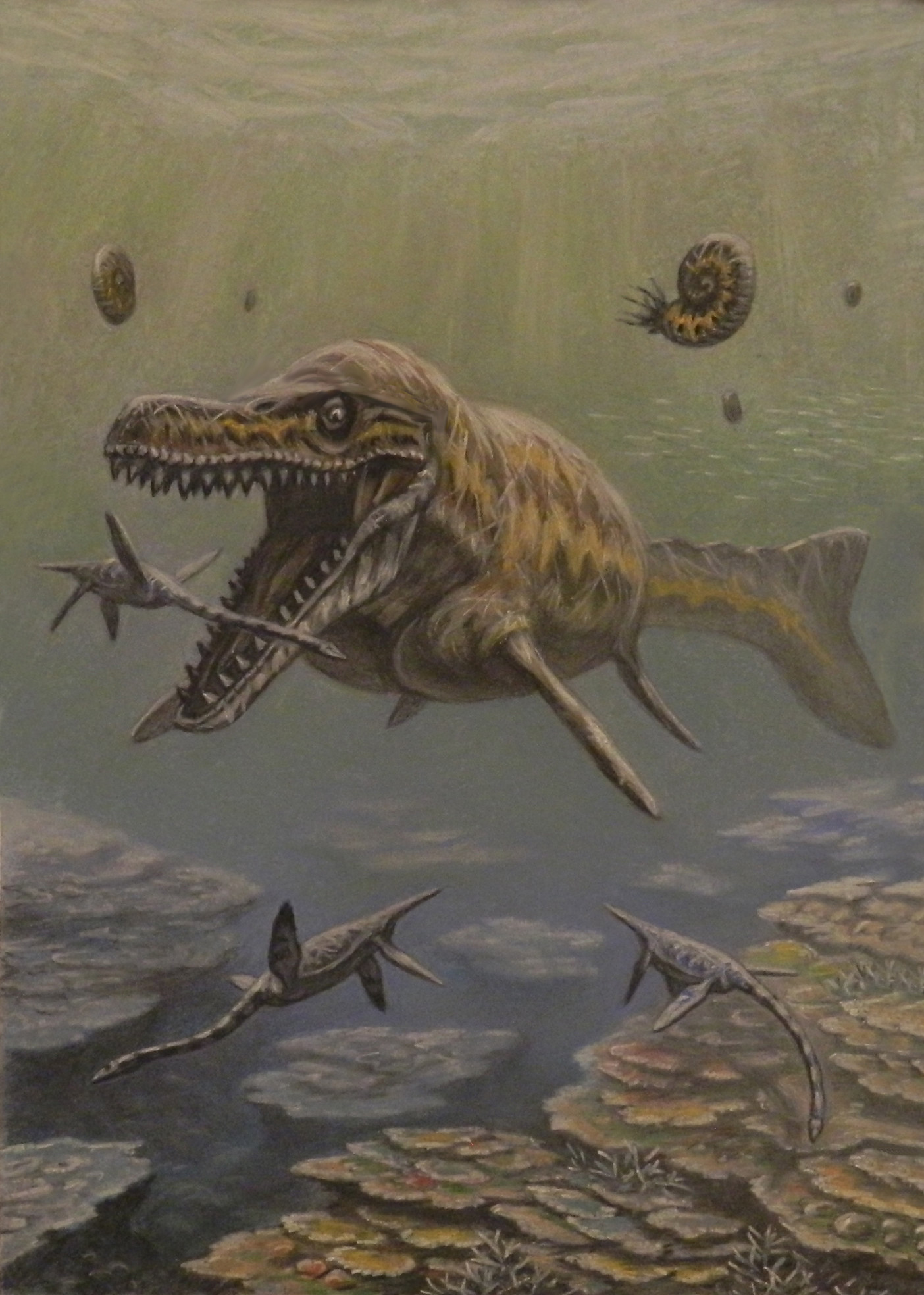
Life restoration of the related Goronyosaurus hunting juvenile plesiosaurs

The body length of Khinjaria was estimated at 8 metres (26 ft). This, in addition to its fanglike teeth, would have allowed it to hunt large prey. The maxilla held ten or eleven teeth, compared to eleven in the closely related Goronyosaurus, twelve in Gavialimimus, and eleven or twelve in Selmasaurus johnsoni. Like Goronyosaurus, Khinjaria had twelve teeth in its dentary. These teeth are proportionately large, like Selmasaurus johnsoni, in contrast to the small teeth of other plioplatecarpine taxa like Gavialimimus. In general, the rostrum is unusually short and the orbit size is reduced. The maxilla and dentary are robust and deep. The skull is very akinetic, meaning that the individual bones comprising it did not move in relation to each other. This would have allowed the jaws to be more powerful.

== Classification ==
In their phylogenetic analyses, Longrich et al. (2024) recovered Khinjaria within a clade of plioplatecarpine mosasaurids, as the sister taxon to Goronyosaurus. They named this clade—also containing Gavialimimus, Goronyosaurus, and Selmasaurus—the Selmasaurini. A similar clade was recovered by Strong et al. (2020) in their description of Gavialimimus. The results of the analyses of Longrich et al. are shown in the cladogram below:

- - Tethysaurus
  - Plioplatecarpinae
    - Russellosaurus
    - - Yaguarasaurus columbianus
      - - Carlile Formation plioplatecarpine
        - - Yaguarasaurus regiomontanus
          - - Ectenosaurus spp.
            - - Angolasaurus
              - - Plioplatecarpini
                - Selmasaurini
                  - Selmasaurus johnsoni
                  - - Selmasaurus russelli
                    - - Gavialimimus
                      - - Goronyosaurus
                        - Khinjaria
