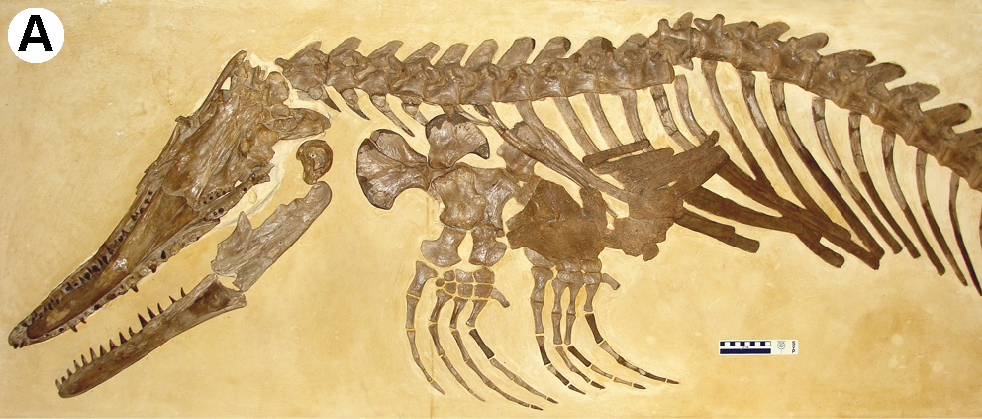
- Partial skeleton of Ectenosaurus clidastoides.

Scientific classification
- Kingdom: Animalia
- Phylum: Chordata
- Class: Reptilia
- Order: Squamata
- Clade: †Mosasauria
- Family: †Mosasauridae
- Clade: †Russellosaurina
- Subfamily: †Plioplatecarpinae
- Genus: †Ectenosaurus; Russell, 1967

Type species
- †Platecarpus clidastoides Merriam, 1894

Species
- E. clidastoides (Merriam, 1894); E. everhartorum Willman et al., 2021; E. tlemonectes Kiernan and Ebersole, 2023; E. shannoni Kiernan and Ebersole, 2023

= Ectenosaurus =

Ectenosaurus Temporal range: Late Cretaceous, 85.8–82 Ma

Extinct genus of lizards

Ectenosaurus is an extinct genus of marine lizard belonging to the mosasaur family. It is classified as part of the Plioplatecarpinae subfamily alongside genera like Angolasaurus and Platecarpus. Ectenosaurus is known from the Santonian and Campanian of Kansas, Alabama, and Texas.

The generic name means "drawn-out lizard", from Greek ectenes ("drawn-out") and Greek sauros ("lizard") referencing the elongated muzzle.

== Description ==
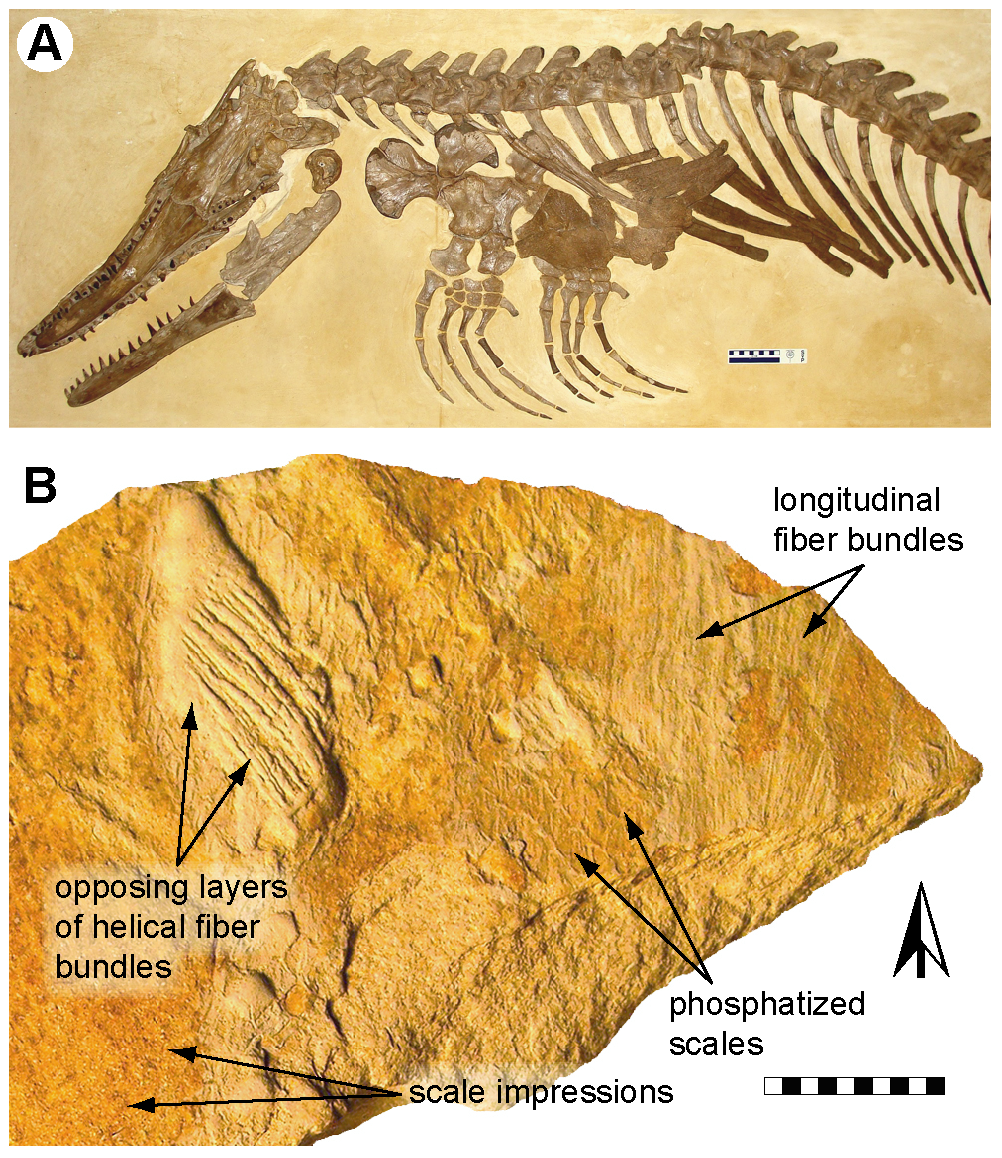
Partial skeleton (A) and soft tissues (B) of Ectenosaurus clidastoides.

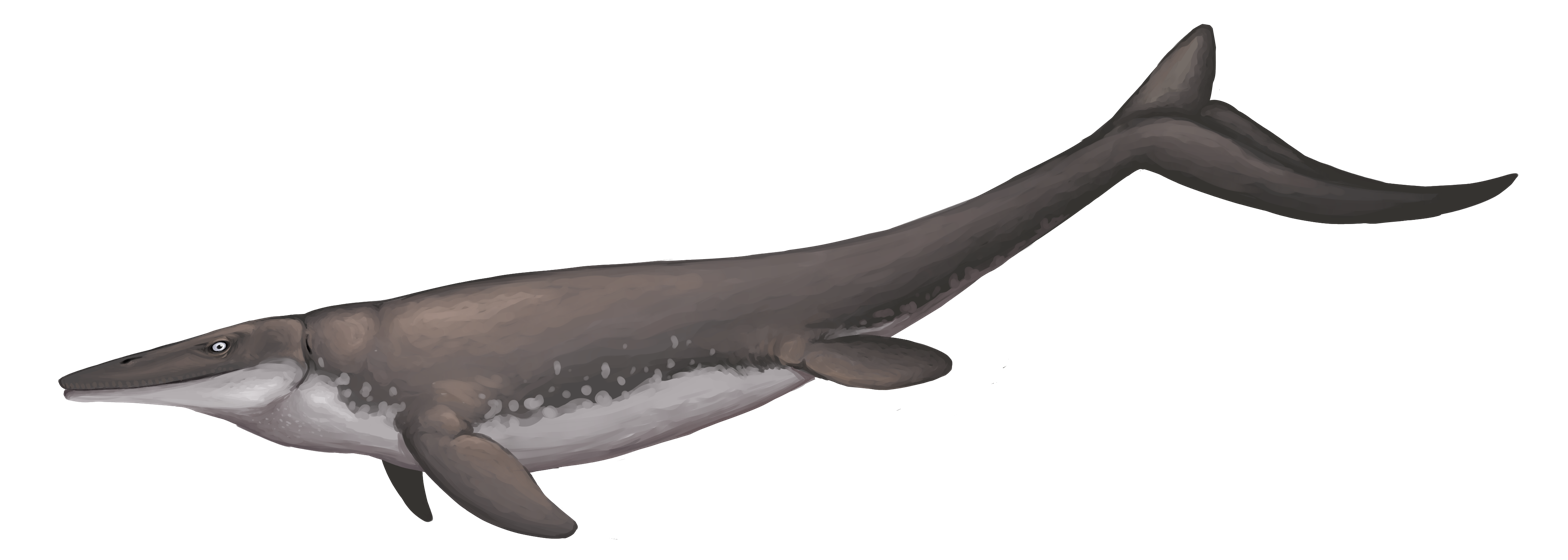
Reconstruction of Ectenosaurus clidastoides.

With the preserved skull about 64.5 cm (2.12 ft) long, Ectenosaurus is estimated to have reached 5–6 m (16–20 ft) in length. It was a rare genus of mosasaur with several unique characteristics that clearly separate it from other mosasaur genera. The most prominent of these features is its elongated jaws, elongated in a similar vein to other mosasaurs with elongated jaws, such as Plotosaurus and Pluridens.

Dale Allan Russell (1967) considered the form of the teeth, the shape of the frontal and the large suprastapedial process of the quadrate as evidence of a close relation between Ectenosaurus and Platecarpus. He separated Ectenosaurus from Platecarpus based on the elongated snout, the exclusion of the prefrontals from the narial borders and the fusion of the supra- and infrastapedial processes.

=== Scales and locomotion ===
The specimen FHSM VP-401 preserve significantly comprehensive skin impressions from Ectenosaurus, which makes it possible to draw conclusions not only about mosasaur integument at large but also about mosasaur movement and propulsion. The scales are considerably smaller in size (2.7×2.0 mm) than those found in the famed LACM 128319 specimen of Platecarpus (3.8×4.4 mm), despite the animals being of similar sizes.

The combination of small and firmly anchored body scales as well as a complex meshwork of alternating crossed-helical and longitudinal fiber bundles suggest that the anterior torso of Ectenosaurus was reasonably stiff. This also suggests that this section of the body was quite rigid during locomotion, and that the main form of propulsion would have to have been done by the tail (likely possessing a tail fin like other mosasaur species), and that it could not move by undulating its entire body like snakes do, a previously popular view of mosasaur locomotion.

== History of discovery ==
Ectenosaurus was originally described as a species of Platecarpus, P. clidastoides, in 1894 by John Campbell Merriam. The type specimen was collected by Charles Hazelius Sternberg or Georg Bauer from Logan County in Kansas and was housed in the Bayerische Staatssammlung für Paläontologie in Munich, where it was likely destroyed in 1944 during the Second World War. A second specimen (which was also much better preserved) was discovered by George Fryer Sternberg in 1953, which he initially identified as a Clidastes velox. The specimen, formerly catalogued as GFS 109-53, was about 3 metres (9.8 ft) in length and largely articulated, though the tail and rear limbs were missing due to erosion.

This specimen was then exhibited at the Sternberg Memorial Museum on the campus of Fort Hays State University from its discovery until 1999 when the museum was closed and moved. Since the museum moved, the specimen remains in storage, where it is catalogued as FHSM VP-401. It was examined in 1963 by Dale A. Russell who determined that it represented a Platecarpus clidastoides and not a Clidastes velox. In his Systematics and Morphology of American Mosasaurs (1967) he re-described the species as part of a new genus, Ectenosaurus. Russell also assigned several additional specimens to Ectenosaurus clidastoides, namely YPM 4671, 4672, 4673, and 4674 in the Yale Peabody Museum.

In 2021, Alexander Willman, Takuya Konishi, and Michael Caldwell designated FHSM VP-401 as the neotype of E. clidastoides, as a replacement for the type specimen. They also named another mosasaur specimen discovered in Logan County during the 1970s, catalogued as FHSM VP-5515, as a new species of Ectenosaurus, Ectenosaurus everhartorum. This species was named after marine reptile researchers Mike Everhart and Pamela Everhart. Since they could not be differentiated, the YPM specimens were removed by Willman and colleagues from E. clidastoides and considered as Ectenosaurus sp. In 2023, Caitlín R. Kiernan and Jun A. Ebersole named two new species of the genus: E. tlemonectes from the Niobrara of Kansas and E. shannoni from the Mooreville Chalk of Alabama.

== Classification ==
Ectenosaurus has been seen as a plioplatecarpine for most of the time since its discovery, partly due to long having been classified as a species of Platecarpus. Some analyses recover it as a mosasaurine however, sharing close relations with Prognathodon. The cladogram below follows Simões et al. (2017), collapsed to only display the Plioplatecarpinae, and shows Ectenosaurus in relation to other plioplatecarpines.

- Plioplatecarpinae
  - - - Angolasaurus bocagei
      - - Selmasaurus johnsoni
        - Ectenosaurus clidastoides
    - - Plesioplatecarpus planifrons
      - - Latoplatecarpus willistoni
        - - Platecarpus tympaniticus
          - Plioplatecarpus

== Palaeoecology ==
Stable isotope analysis indicates that Ectenosaurus was one of the few plioplatecarpines that was not restricted to nearshore marine habitats.
