= List of mosasaur type specimens =

This list of mosasaur type specimens is a list of fossils that are official standard-bearers for inclusion in the species and genera of the squamate clade Mosasauroidea, which includes the line of predatory marine lizards that culminates in the mosasaurids. Type specimens are definitionally members of biological taxa, and additional specimens are "referred" to these taxa only if an expert deems them sufficiently similar to the type.

== The list ==
Species	Genus	Nickname	Catalogue number	Institution	Age	Unit	Country	Notes	Images
Jormungandr walhallaensis	Jormungandr	"Jorgie"	NDGS 10838	North Dakota State Fossil Collection	Campanian	Pembina Member, Pierre Shale Formation	North Dakota, USA		
Mosasaurus hoffmannii	Mosasaurus	le grand animal fossil des carrièrs de Maestricht	MNHN AC 9648	Muséum national d'Histoire Naturelle	Maastrichtian	Kanne Horizon, Nekum Chalk, Maastricht Formation	Netherlands	The holotype specimen was excavated from the limestone quarries of Mount Saint Peter near Maastricht. It is the second documented discovery of mosasauroid fossils and was found between the 1770s and early 1780s. It was brought to Paris after the siege of Maastricht, where it was studied by Cuvier.	
Mosasaurus missouriensis	Mosasaurus	The Goldfuss Mosasaur	MNHN 9587/RFWUIP 1327	Muséum national d'Histoire Naturelle/Goldfuß Museum	Campanian	DeGrey Formation (Pierre Shale Group)	South Dakota (USA)	MNHN 9587 and RFWUIP were uncovered separately. MNHN 9587 was originally assessed as 'Ichtyosaurus missouriensis', while RFWUIP 1327 was described as 'Mosasaurus maximiliani'. Later both specimens were confirmed to belong to the same individual and the species name was established.	Skull of Mosasaurus missouriensis holotype RFWUIP 1327 with a cast of MNHN 9587.
Sarabosaurus dahli	Sarabosaurus		UMNH VP21800	Natural History Museum of Utah	Turonian	Tropic Shale	Utah (USA)		
Tylosaurus proriger	Tylosaurus		MCZ 4374	Museum of Comparative Zoology, Harvard University, Cambridge, Massachusetts		Niobrara Formation	Kansas (USA)	The specimen consists of the anterior portion of a skull, cranial fragments and thirteen vertebrae. The species was originally named Macrosaurus proriger.	
