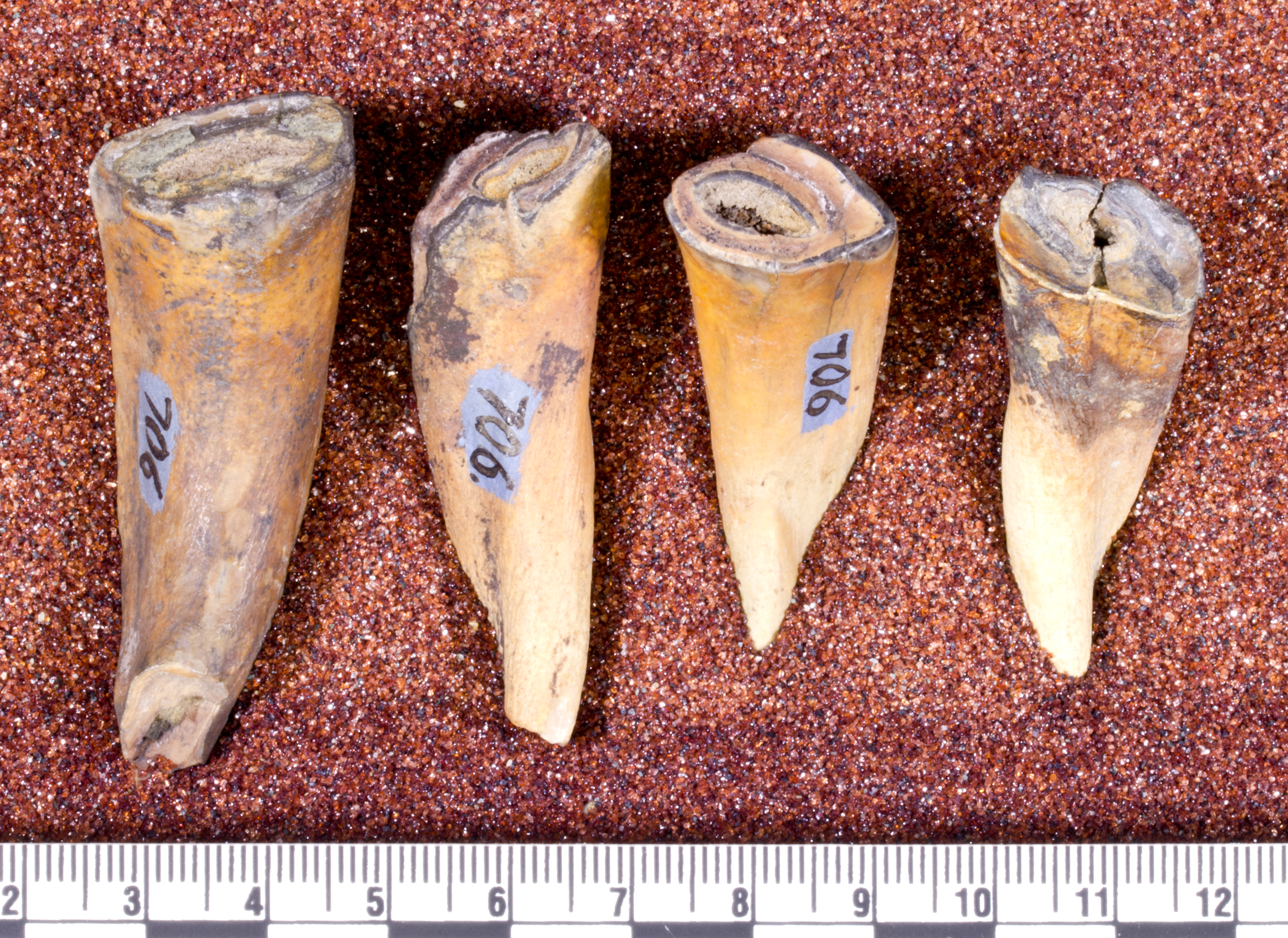
- Incisors found at Iberia Parish, Louisiana.

Scientific classification
- Kingdom: Animalia
- Phylum: Chordata
- Class: Mammalia
- Order: Perissodactyla
- Family: Equidae
- Genus: Equus
- Species: †E. fraternus

Binomial name
- †Equus fraternus Leidy, 1860

= Equus fraternus =

Equus fraternus Temporal range: 1.8–0.012 Ma Irvingtonian to Rancholabrean

Extinct species of mammal

Equus fraternus is a possibly dubious extinct species of Equus that lived in North America during the Pleistocene epoch. Fossils of E. fraternus have been reported from Irvingtonian and Rancholabrean deposits in Alberta, Canada and Florida, Illinois, Mississippi, Nebraska, Pennsylvania, South Carolina, and Texas, USA. A possible record is also known from Costa Rica. Its holotype (name-bearing) specimen consists of an isolated second premolar, which was cataloged at the American Museum of Natural History under AMNH 9200. In a 1985 dissertation, American researcher Melissa C. Winans stated that the tooth characteristics used to diagnose (differentiate one species from others) E. fraternus were invalid, as they could have been caused by wear. Additionally, the holotype material contained more than one individual. Despite this, Italian researcher Augusto Azzaroli assigned several skulls, mandibles, and postcranial elements to this species. Azzaroli considered E. fraternus a close relative of Mexican and South American horses, especially E. conversidens. Its taxonomic status remains unclear.
