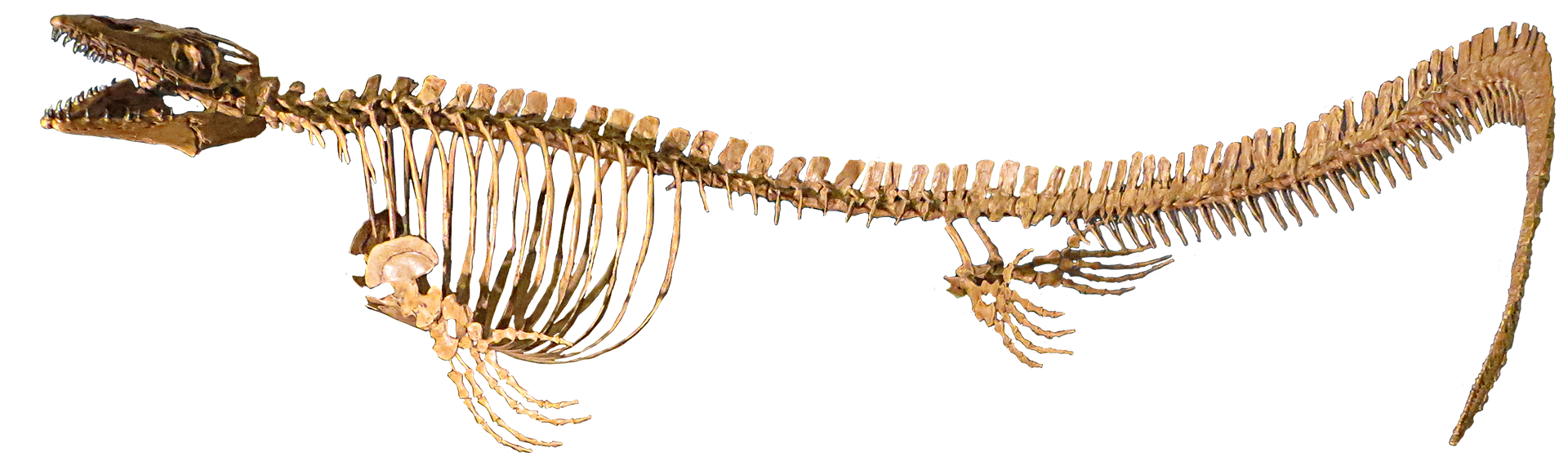
- Skeleton cast of Platecarpus tympaniticus

Scientific classification
- Kingdom: Animalia
- Phylum: Chordata
- Class: Reptilia
- Order: Squamata
- Clade: †Mosasauria
- Family: †Mosasauridae
- Clade: †Russellosaurina
- Subfamily: †Plioplatecarpinae; Dollo, 1884; Williston, 1897

Genera
- †Angolasaurus; †Ectenosaurus; †Oneirosaurus; †Sarabosaurus; †Plioplatecarpini; †Latoplatecarpus; †Platecarpus; †Plesioplatecarpus; †Plioplatecarpus; †Selmasaurini; †Gavialimimus; †Goronyosaurus; †Khinjaria; †Selmasaurus

= Plioplatecarpinae =

Plioplatecarpinae Temporal range: Late Cretaceous 94–66 Ma

Extinct subfamily of lizards

Plioplatecarpinae is a subfamily of mosasaurs, a diverse group of Late Cretaceous marine squamates. Members of the subfamily are informally and collectively known as "plioplatecarpines" and have been recovered from all continents, though the occurrences in Australia remain questionable. The subfamily includes the genera Latoplatecarpus, Platecarpus, Plioplatecarpus and Plesioplatecarpus.

Plioplatecarpines were small to medium-sized mosasaurs that were comparatively fast and agile compared to mosasaurs of other subfamilies. The first plioplatecarpines appear in the Turonian and are among the oldest of mosasaurs, and the clade persists throughout the Maastrichtian, a period of approximately 24 million years. The subfamily was seemingly heavily affected during a poorly understood middle-Campanian mosasaur extinction event and its genera appear to have faced competition from mosasaurine mosasaurs during the Maastrichtian, leading to a decline in numbers and in diversity.

The etymology of this group derives from the genus Plioplatecarpus (Greek pleion = "more" + Greek plate = "oar" + Greek karpos = "wrist, carpus").

== Description ==
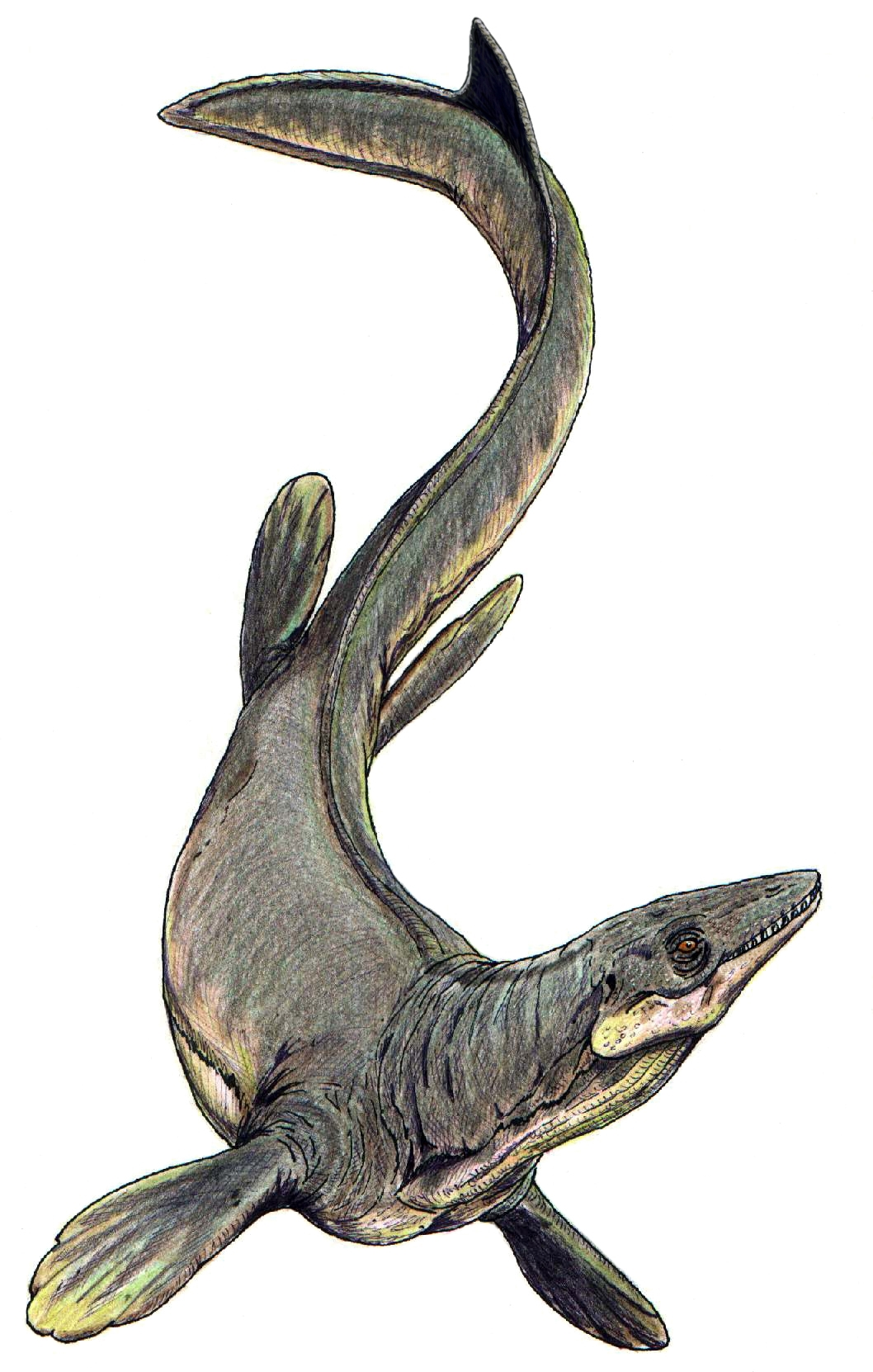
Reconstruction of Plioplatecarpus

In general, plioplatecarpines were short-skulled, short-bodied forms and were among the strongest swimming mosasaurs. Some workers have likened them to pinnipeds in their agility. Most forms were likely piscivores ("fish eaters"), though cephalopods (belemnites) evidently formed an important part of the plioplatecarpine diet. Larger forms may have also fed upon smaller marine reptiles. At least one genus evolved sturdy crushing teeth adapted to feeding on shellfish. The plioplatecarpines were medium-sized mosasaurs ranging from around 2.5 to 7.5 meters in length.

Russell (1967, pp. 148) defined the Plioplatecarpinae as follows: Small rostrum present or absent anterior to premaxillary teeth. Cranial nerves X, XI, XII leave lateral wall of opisthotic through single foramen. Canal or deep groove in floor of basioccipital and basispehnoid for basilar artery. Suprastapedial process of quadrate large, bluntly terminated and with parallel sides. Dorsal edge of surangular rounded and longitudinally horizontal...Twenty-nine or less presacral vertebrae present. Length of presacral series less than that of postsacral, neural spines of posterior caudal vertebrae at most only slightly elongated, do not form an appreciable fin. Haemal arches usually unfused to caudal centra. Appendicular elements lack smoothly finished articular surfaces." Plioplatecarpinae was given a phylogenetic definition by Jack Conrad in 2008 as "all taxa sharing a more recent common ancestor with Plioplatecarpus marshi than with Tylosaurus proriger or Mosasaurus hoffmanni".

== Phylogeny ==
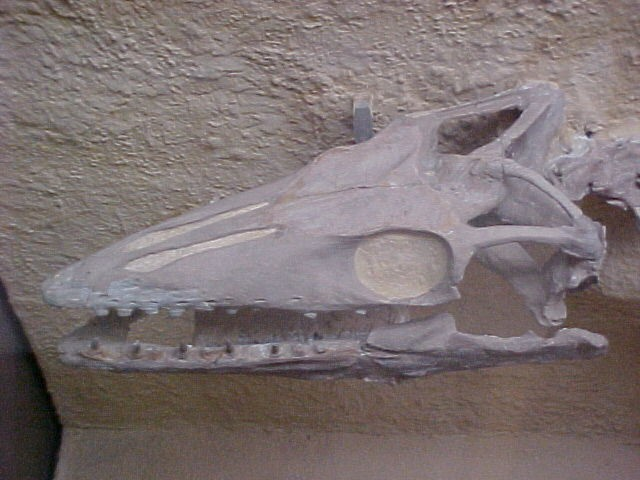
Dorsolateral view of Platecarpus tympaniticus skull at Yale University, Peabody Museum

Russell included two tribes, the Plioplatecarpini and Prognathodontini, the latter of which has been reassigned by Bell to the Mosasaurinae.

Polcyn and Bell (2005, p. 322) have erected a more inclusive clade, the parafamily Russellosaurina, which includes the "subfamilies Tylosaurinae and Plioplatecarpini and their sister-clade containing the genera Tethysaurus, Russellosaurus, and Yaguarasaurus."

The cladogram below follows Simões et al. (2017)

- Plioplatecarpinae
  - - - Angolasaurus bocagei
      - - Selmasaurus johnsoni
        - Ectenosaurus clidastoides
    - - Plesioplatecarpus planifrons
      - - Latoplatecarpus willistoni
        - - Platecarpus tympaniticus
          - Plioplatecarpus

In their 2024 description of the Moroccan plioplatecarpine Khinjaria, Longrich et al. performed a phylogenetic analysis, finding support for a clade of non-plioplatecarpin plioplatecarpines, named the Selmasaurini, which was recovered as the sister taxon to Plioplatecarpini. Both clades were defined respectively as "all species closer to Selmasaurus russelli than Plioplatecarpus marshi or Platecarpus tympaniticus" and "all species closer to Plioplatecarpus marshi than to Selmasaurus russelli". A similar clade was recovered by Strong et al. (2020) in their description of Gavialimimus. The results of the analyses of Longrich et al. are shown in the cladogram below:

- - Tethysaurus
  - Plioplatecarpinae
    - Russellosaurus
    - - Yaguarasaurus columbianus
      - - Carlile Formation plioplatecarpine
        - - Yaguarasaurus regiomontanus
          - - Ectenosaurus spp.
            - - Angolasaurus
              - - Plioplatecarpini
                  - Plesioplatecarpus
                  - - Platecarpus
                    - - Latoplatecarpus willistoni
                      - - Plioplatecarpus nichollsae
                        - - Plioplatecarpus brachycephalus
                          - - Plioplatecarpus corphaeus
                            - Plioplatecarpus primaevus
                            - - Plioplatecarpus peckensis
                              - Plioplatecarpus houzeaui
                              - Plioplatecarpus marshi
                - Selmasaurini
                  - Selmasaurus johnsoni
                  - - Selmasaurus russelli
                    - - Gavialimimus
                      - - Goronyosaurus
                        - Khinjaria
