= Sarabosaurus =

Sarabosaurus Temporal range: Early Turonian, 93.7 Ma

Scientific classification
- Domain: Eukaryota
- Kingdom: Animalia
- Phylum: Chordata
- Class: Reptilia
- Order: Squamata
- Clade: †Mosasauria
- Family: †Mosasauridae
- Clade: †Russellosaurina
- Subfamily: †Plioplatecarpinae
- Genus: †Sarabosaurus; Polcyn et al., 2023

Type species
- †Sarabosaurus dahli Polcyn et al., 2023

Genus of extinct squamate

Sarabosaurus (from the Arabic "sarab", meaning desert mirage and the Greek "sauros", meaning lizard) is a monospecific genus of plioplatecarpine mosasaurid from the lower Turonian Tropic Shale of Utah, United States. The type and only species, S. dahli, was named in honor of Steve Dahl, a volunteer at the Grand Staircase-Escalante National Monument in Kanab, Utah.

== Discovery ==
The holotype specimen of Sarabosaurus, UMNH VP21800, preserves a decent amount of the skull and of the axial postcranial skeleton. Even though it is the oldest mosasaurid currently known from the Western Interior Seaway, having been dated at around 93.7 Ma, the presence of a unique vascular pattern of the basisphenoid that has thus far only been found in derived members of the clade Plioplaticarpinae has warranted the animal's inclusion in this group. Phylogenetic analysis has recovered S. dahli as the sister taxon to Yaguarasaurus and all other later diverging plioplatecarpines.

== Description ==
Sarabosaurus is a small mosasaur, with the type specimen estimated at 3 metres (9.8 ft) in total body length. Preserved growth rings indicate that the holotype was a mature individual, and would have been 3 to 4 years old at the time of death.
