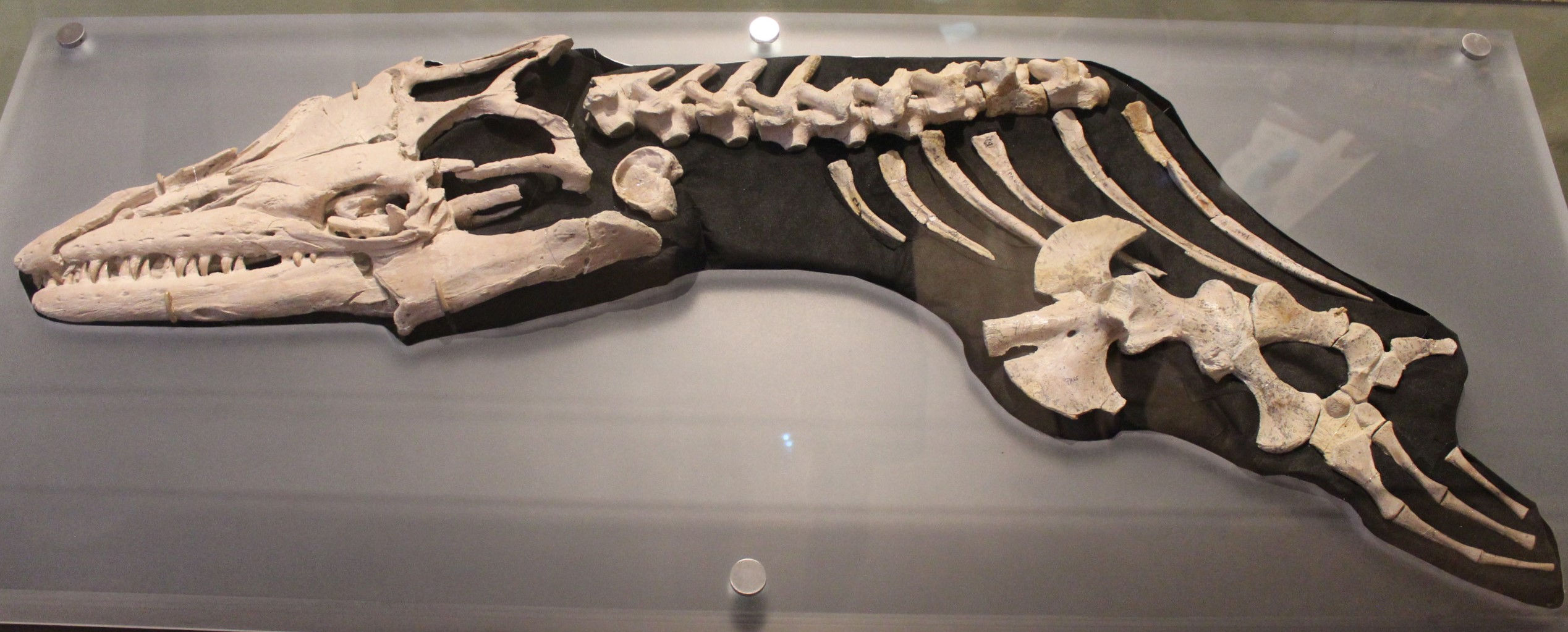
- Partial skeleton (MGUAN-PA 065) at the National Museum of Natural History

Scientific classification
- Kingdom: Animalia
- Phylum: Chordata
- Class: Reptilia
- Order: Squamata
- Clade: †Mosasauria
- Family: †Mosasauridae
- Clade: †Russellosaurina
- Subfamily: †Plioplatecarpinae
- Genus: †Angolasaurus; Antunes, 1964
- Species: †A. bocagei

Binomial name
- †Angolasaurus bocagei Antunes, 1964

Synonyms
- Platecarpus bocagei Lingham-Soliar, 1994

= Angolasaurus =

Angolasaurus Temporal range: Turonian-Coniacian 92.1–88 Ma

Extinct genus of lizards

Angolasaurus ("Angola lizard") is an extinct genus of mosasaur. Definite remains from this genus have been recovered from the Turonian and Coniacian of Angola, and possibly the Coniacian of the United States, the Turonian of Brazil, and the Maastrichtian of Niger. While at one point considered a species of Platecarpus, recent phylogenetic analyses have placed it between the (then) plioplatecarpines Ectenosaurus and Selmasaurus, maintaining a basal position within the plioplatecarpinae.

Its wide geographic range make it one of the only Turonian mosasaurs with a transatlantic range.

== Description ==
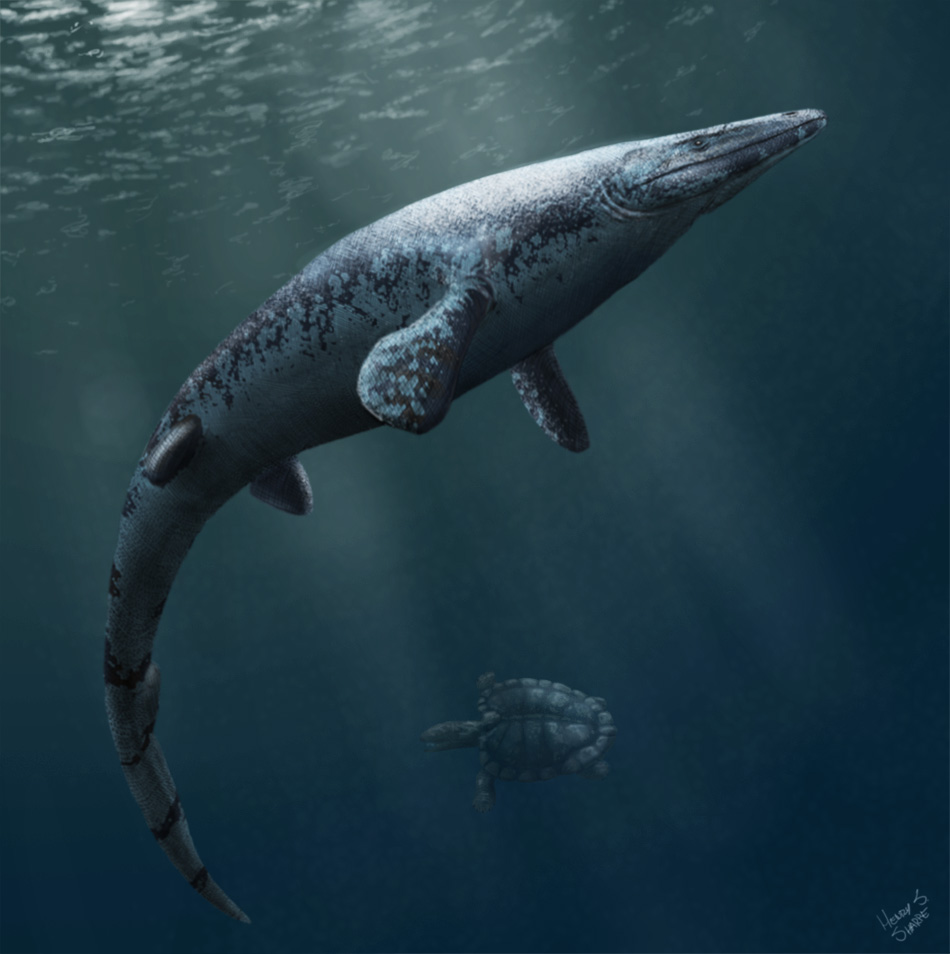
Life reconstruction of Angolasaurus alongside its contemporary, Angolachelys

Angolasaurus was a small mosasaur, with a skull length estimated at 40 centimetres (1.3 ft), suggesting a possible total length of about 4 meters (13 feet) based on the ratio provided by Russell (1967). It shared much of a body plan with its relative Platecarpus, but with a slightly longer skull relative to body length. Its skull housed 11 maxillary teeth, 4 premaxillary teeth, and 12 dentary teeth. The phylogenetic relationship of Angolasaurus indicates that individuals of this genus possessed a tail fluke, more forward-lying nostrils, and keeled scales for hydrodynamic efficiency.

Due to declining sea temperatures in the area that Angolasaurus inhabited, as well as the later Bientiaba locality, it has been hypothesized that it and the other mosasaurs inhabiting its region may have had an increased coverage of dark patterning on its dorsal surface to aid in thermoregulation.

== History of discovery ==
First named in 1964 by Miguel Telles Antunes on the basis of a partial skull and skeleton, Angolasaurus was reassigned in 1994 to the genus Platecarpus. This placement was subsequently struck down in studies in 2005, which nested it within the plioplatecarpinae. Fieldwork between 2005 and 2009 recovered at least two new Angolasaurus skeletons. One new skull as well as the type skull were CT scanned to reveal intricate details of the interior braincase that allowed for a more concrete placement within the plioplatecarpinae. The most recent major phylogenetic analysis conducted on the mosasauridae placed Angolasaurus as basal to the clade composed of the russellosaurine subfamilies Tylosaurinae and Plioplatecarpinae, and part of neither.

In 2007, two individuals from the Eagle Ford Formation of Texas were described as belonging to the genus Angolasaurus, one of which preserved part of the hyoid apparatus. The same abstract assigned two teeth previously assigned to Platecarpus to Angolasaurus. These teeth came from the Sergipe Basin of Brazil, and are virtually indistinguishable from those found in the holotype of Angolasaurus bocagei. These discoveries made Angolasaurus the first known Turonian mosasaur genus with a transatlantic distribution.

== Paleoecology ==
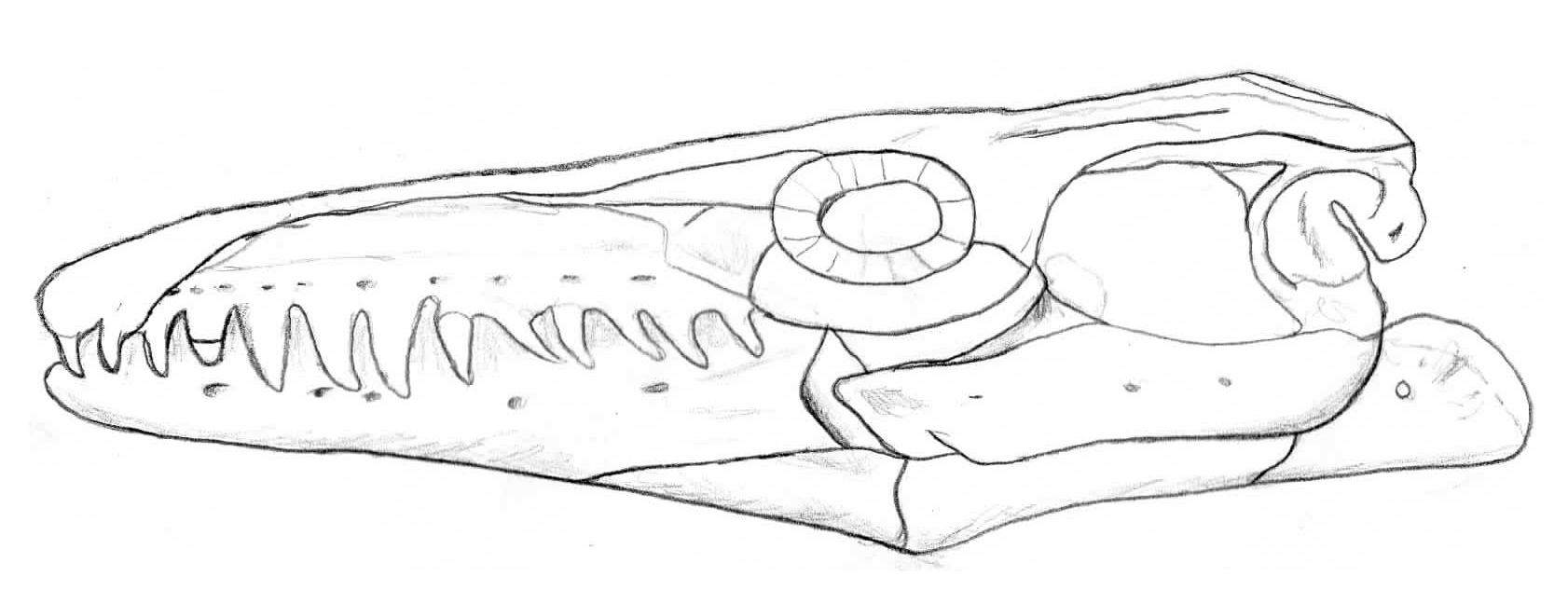
Reconstruction of holotype (SGMA 12/60) based on Antunes (1964)

=== Angola ===
Angolasaurus bocagei, recovered only from the Itombe Formation, shared its habitat with the tylosaurine species Tylosaurus (formerly Mosasaurus) iembeensis and the durophagous shallow-water turtle Angolachelys. Indeterminate halisaurine and plesiosaur remains have also been recovered from this region. Terrestrial fauna consisted solely of the sauropod Angolatitan.

=== Niger ===
Known from the Dukamaje Formation on the basis of a few vertebrae of varying ontogenetic stages, Angolasaurus coexisted here with fellow plioplatecarpine genera Platecarpus and Plioplatecarpus, the globidensine genus Igdamanosaurus, the halisaurine genus Halisaurus, the mosasaurine genus Mosasaurus, and the mosasaurid genus Goronyosaurus.

=== United States ===
Angolasaurus is known from the Eagle Ford Formation of Texas. Other Turonian aquatic reptiles from the Eagle Ford Formation include the plesiosaurs Polyptychodon, Libonectes, Cimoliasaurus, and Plesiosaurus, and the mosasaur Clidastes. Indeterminate mosasaur and plesiosaur remains are also known from here.
