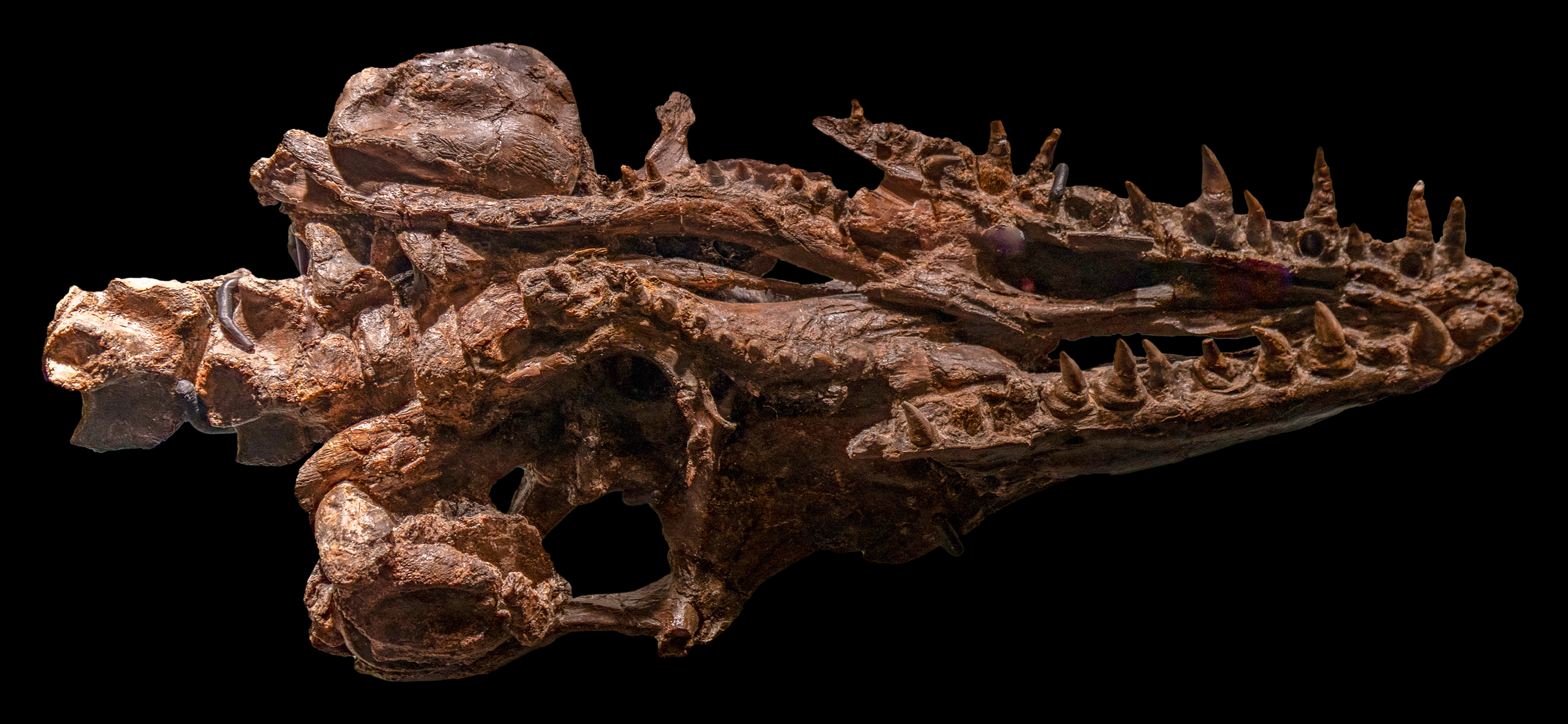
- Skull shown from below, Royal Tyrrell Museum

Scientific classification
- Kingdom: Animalia
- Phylum: Chordata
- Class: Reptilia
- Order: Squamata
- Clade: †Mosasauria
- Family: †Mosasauridae
- Clade: †Russellosaurina
- Tribe: †Plioplatecarpini
- Genus: †Latoplatecarpus; Konishi & Caldwell, 2011

Species
- †L. willistoni Konishi & Caldwell, 2011 (type); †L(?). nichollsae (Cuthbertson et al., 2007 [originally Plioplatecarpus nichollsae])

= Latoplatecarpus =

Latoplatecarpus Temporal range: Late Cretaceous, 80.5–79 Ma

Extinct genus of lizards

Latoplatecarpus is an extinct genus of plioplatecarpine mosasaur known from the Late Cretaceous (early middle Campanian stage) of the northern Gulf of Mexico, the Western Interior Basin of North America, and a singular specimen from the Saratov Region, of Russia. It was among the largest plioplatecarpine mosasaurs, with L(?). nichollsae measuring over 8 metres (26 ft) in total body length.

== Discovery ==
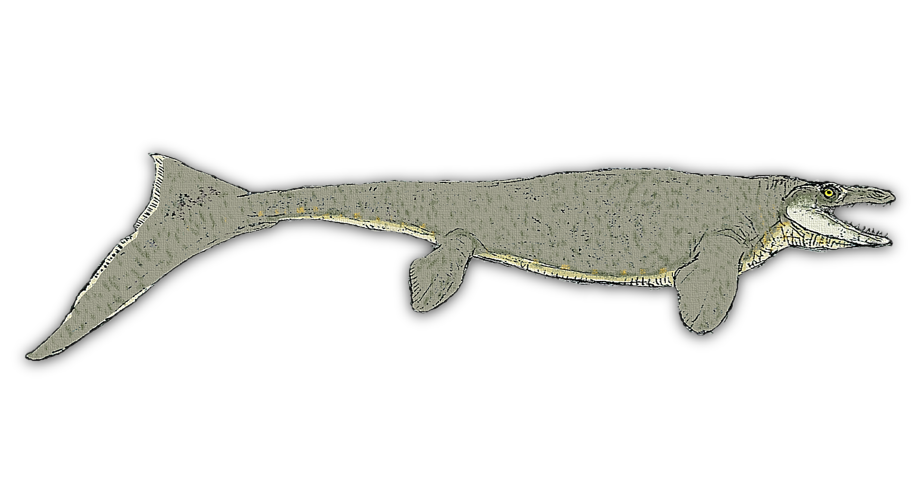
Life restoration

Latoplatecarpus was named by Takuya Konishi and Michael W. Caldwell in 2011 and the type species is Latoplatecarpus willistoni. L. willistoni is known from the holotype TMP 84.162.01, a nearly complete skull, including the mandible and dentary, and a partial postcranial skeleton. The holotype was collected in the Pembina Mountain, in southern Manitoba, from the Pembina Member of the Pierre Shale, dating to the early middle Campanian stage of the Late Cretaceous period, about 80.5 million years ago. Three specimens are also referred to this species, including DMNH 8769 (a very well preserved cranial and postcranial skeleton), SDSMT 30139 and AMNH 2182.

Konishi and Caldwell reassigned a second species, L. nichollsae, to this genus from Plioplatecarpus. A new phylogenetic analysis performed by them failed to recover the monophyly of the genus, however it found the North American referred material (e.g. FMNHPR 465, FMNHPR 467 and GSATC 220) of the dubious Platecarpus somenensis to nest within L. nichollsae. The same conclusion has been made based on the ontogenetic, biostratigraphic, and paleobiogeographic data and interpretations. The interpretation of L. nichollsae as a species of Latoplatecarpus was challenged by subsequent authors, who have reassigned the species back to Plioplatecarpus.
