= Augusto Azzaroli =

Augusto Azzaroli (28 September 1921 - 20 July 2015) was an Italian paleontologist, geologist and stratigrapher. He is best known for his work covering the Pliocene and Pleistocene periods, particularly their stratigraphy and fossil mammals.

== Early life and education ==
Azzaroli was born in Bologna on 28 September 1921, alongside his twin brother, Giulio. His family later moved to Florence, where he studied Natural Sciences, graduating in 1945 with a thesis on foraminifera in the surrounding region. After serving in the Alpine Corps he continued his research, including describing the fossil monkey Macaca majori from Sardinia in 1946.

== Career ==
From 1950 to 1960, Azzaroli served as Assistant Professor of Geology at the University of Florence. During his tenure there he did extensive work geologically mapping the northern Apennine Mountains. Between 1953 and 1956, Azzaroli undertook geological research in Somaliland. In 1958 Azzaroli was involved in a course of geology and paleontology at the University of Khartoum in Sudan, publishing some research of geology of the region. In 1959 he was appointed Chair of Geology at the University of Bari, and a year later was appointed Full Professor of Palaeontology at the University of Florence, where he would remain until retirement in 1996.

As a researcher, Azzaroli made significant contributions to the systematics and chronostratigraphy of Cenozoic fossil mammals, particularly pigs, deer, equines and rhinoceroses, as well as proboscideans and fossil mammals of Mediterranean islands. He also defined the triparite division of the Villafranchian (a time period in the European land mammal ages scheme covering the latter Pliocene and Early Pleistocene) into Early, Middle and Late, which became widely accepted by other researchers. He also erected the mosasaur genus Goronyosaurus, and was involved in the publication describing the 1 million year old archaic human skull from the Buia locality in Eritrea.

== Personal life and death ==
Azzaroli married Maria Luisa Puccetti in 1952. Puccetti would later become the curator of the Museum of Zoology at Florence University. Azzaroli had a noted passion for horse-riding, as well as the history of the domestic horse, to which he published a book about An Early History of Horsemanship published by Brill. Azzaroli died in Florence on the 20 July 2015.
