= Oceans of Kansas (book) =

2005 book by Michael J. Everhart

Oceans of Kansas: A natural history of the western interior sea
- Author: Michael J. Everhart
- Language: English
- Genre: Reference
- Publisher: Indiana University Press
- Publication date: 2005
- Pages: 344 pp
- ISBN: 0-253-34547-2
- OCLC: 56982260
- Dewey Decimal: 560/.457/09781 22
- LC Class: QE766 .E89 2005

Oceans of Kansas: A natural history of the western interior sea is a book by Michael J. Everhart, Adjunct Curator of Paleontology at the Sternberg Museum of Natural History and past President of the Kansas Academy of Science. It was published in 2005 by Indiana University Press. It has a concomitant website entitled Oceans of Kansas Paleontology. A revised, updated, and expanded edition was published in 2017. It is part of the life of the past series.

== Summary ==
In Oceans of Kansas Everhart discusses the state of the land during the Late Cretaceous and earlier, when the area was covered with the marine waters of the Western Interior Seaway, particularly focusing on the record of the Niobrara Cycle of the Seaway as exposed in central Northwestern Kansas (e.g., Trego and Gove Counties). The geologic record shows that ancient lifeforms such as marine reptiles, pteranodons, and toothed birds inhabited the general area both in and out of the water. Everhart also covers the discovery of the fossils and geographic records as well as the competition between E. D. Cope and O. C. Marsh to collect them.

== Reception ==
Oceans of Kansas has received multiple critical reviews, with Jeffrey V. Yule stating that "Oceans of Kansas offers a well researched and often engaging account of the paleobiology of the Western Interior Seaway...". Jonathan Hendricks noted that while the book's "intended audience is not entirely clear... as a needed summary of our knowledge about the fossils found in the Cretaceous rocks of western Kansas and elsewhere in the Great Plains, Everhart's book is a success." Brian R. Pratt wrote on the second edition that "This edition needs to be seen anew, despite much of the same text and many of the same illustrations. Moreover, it is handsomely produced and printed on coated paper, and this means the illustrations are crisper than they were before." Darren Naish made similar remarks, and commented that "Excellent colour photos and numerous diagrams and other illustrations appear throughout. Many of these images are rare or novel and there’s much here not available elsewhere."
