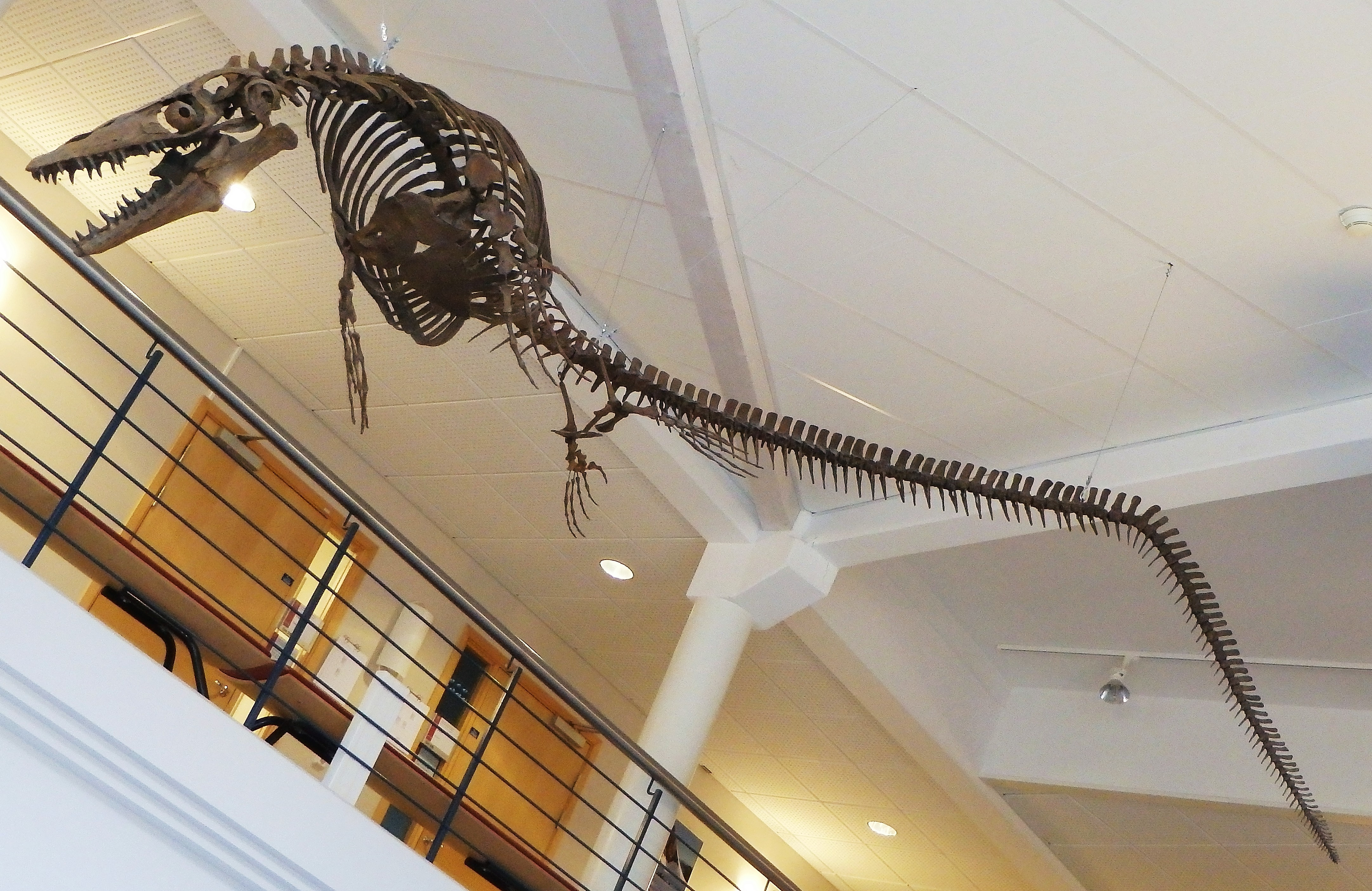
- Reconstructed skeleton in Geocentrum, University of Uppsala

Scientific classification
- Kingdom: Animalia
- Phylum: Chordata
- Class: Reptilia
- Order: Squamata
- Clade: †Mosasauria
- Family: †Mosasauridae
- Clade: †Russellosaurina
- Subfamily: †Plioplatecarpinae
- Tribe: †Plioplatecarpini
- Genus: †Plesioplatecarpus; Konishi & Caldwell, 2011
- Species: †P. planifrons

Binomial name
- †Plesioplatecarpus planifrons (Cope, 1874 [originally Clidastes planifrons])

Synonyms
- Platecarpus planifrons (Cope, 1874)

= Plesioplatecarpus =

Plesioplatecarpus Temporal range: Late Cretaceous, 88–84 Ma

Extinct genus of lizards

Plesioplatecarpus is an extinct genus of plioplatecarpine mosasaur known from the Late Cretaceous (middle Coniacian to middle Santonian stage) of the northern Gulf of Mexico and the Western Interior Basin of North America.

== History ==
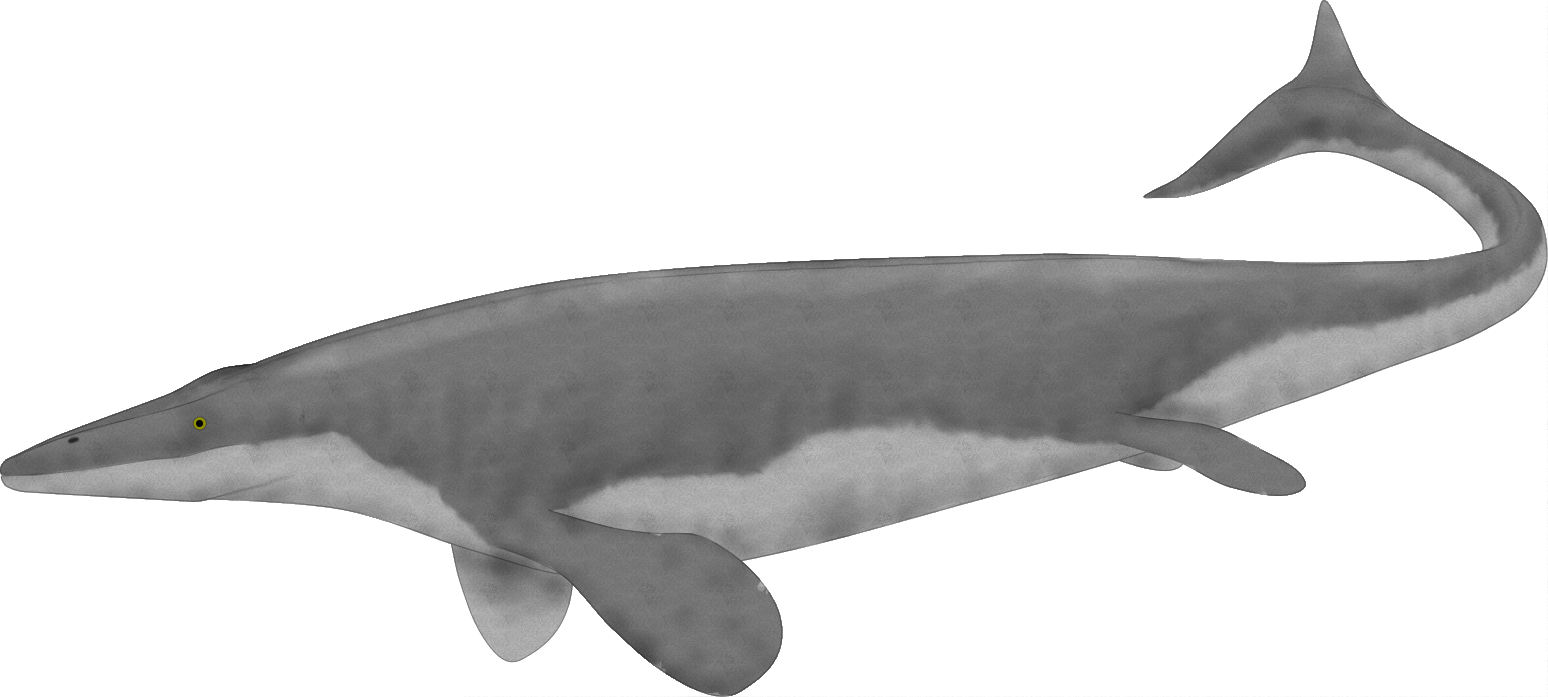
Life restoration

Plesioplatecarpus was originally named by Cope in 1874 as Clidastes planifrons, and later it was reassigned to Platecarpus. The name Plesioplatecarpus was erected by Takuya Konishi and Michael W. Caldwell in 2011 to incorporate Platecarpus planifrons, which was found to be distinct from Platecarpus in a phylogenetic analysis. It is known from the holotype AMNH 1491, a nearly complete skeleton. Many other specimens are also referred to this species, including FHSM VP2116 and 2296, UALVP 24240 and 40402 and YPM 40508.
