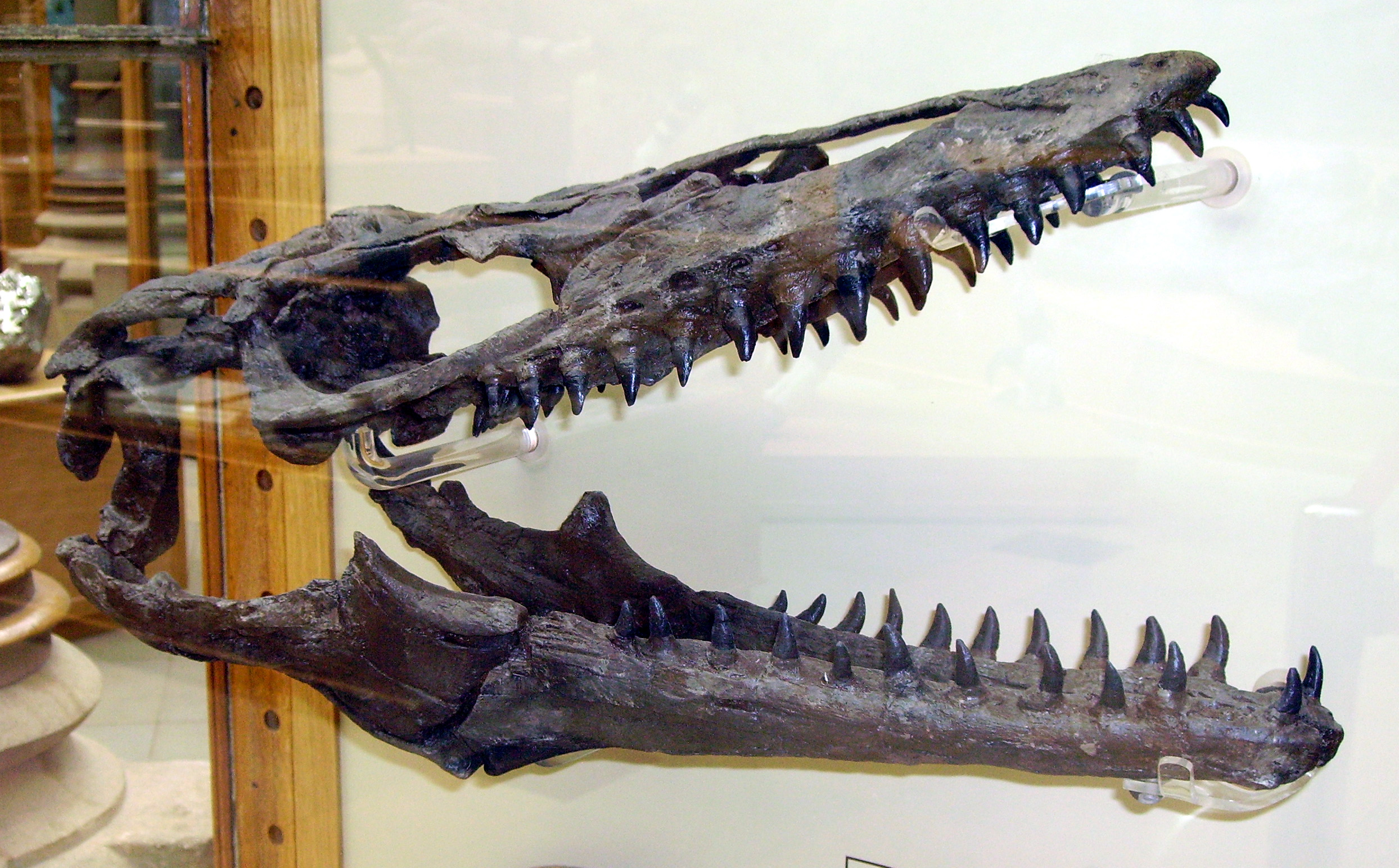
- P. primaevus skull

Scientific classification
- Kingdom: Animalia
- Phylum: Chordata
- Class: Reptilia
- Order: Squamata
- Clade: †Mosasauria
- Family: †Mosasauridae
- Clade: †Russellosaurina
- Subfamily: †Plioplatecarpinae
- Tribe: †Plioplatecarpini
- Genus: †Plioplatecarpus; Dollo, 1882

Species
- †P. marshi Dollo, 1882 (type); †P. depressus (Cope, 1869); †P. primaevus Russell, 1967; †P. houzeaui (Dollo, 1889); †P. peckensis Cuthbertson and Holmes, 2015

Synonyms
- Oterognathus Dollo, 1889

= Plioplatecarpus =

Plioplatecarpus Temporal range: Late Cretaceous, 82–66 Ma

Genus of lizards

Plioplatecarpus is a genus of mosasaur lizard. Like all mosasaurs, it lived in the late Cretaceous period, about 82-68 million years ago.

== Discovery ==
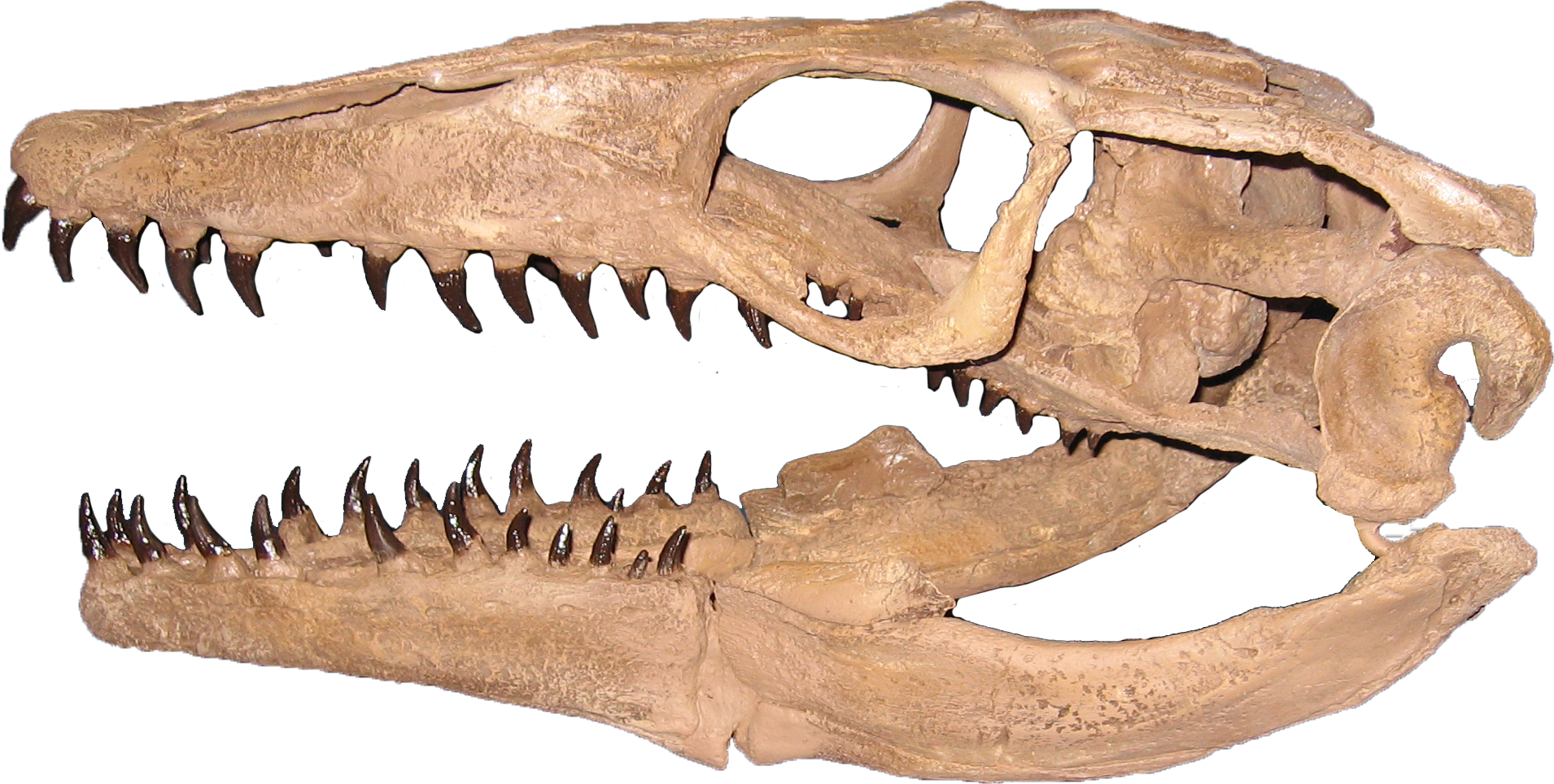
Plioplatecarpus mounted skull in the Rocky Mountain Dinosaur Resource Center in Woodland Park, Colorado

Plioplatecarpus has been found in many locations around the world (most mosasaurs were fairly widespread). Plioplatecarpus has been found in the Pierre Shale of Kansas, Demopolis Chalk of Alabama, and also in Mississippi, Tennessee, North Dakota, South Dakota, Canada, Sweden, and the Netherlands. It was first found in Europe by paleontologist Louis Dollo (P. marshi), in 1882. It was relatively incomplete, but more fossils would soon turn up. In North America, Edward Drinker Cope found another mosasaur in 1869, but had identified it as Mosasaurus. It would later be reclassified as Plioplatecarpus, as would Cope's Liodon, in 1870. Liodon would be reclassified as Platecarpus, and later as Prognathodon or this genus.

=== Possible freshwater occurrence ===
In 1999, Holmes and colleagues described an incomplete specimen of Plioplatecarpus from an early Maastrichtian non-marine deposit, suggesting that this genus might have entered freshwater and estuarine habitats. While the describers of Pannoniasaurus considered this specimen as a random occurrence in a freshwater environment, Taylor and colleagues in 2021 suggested that this specimen and Pannoniasaurus directly support that mosasaurs lived in both marine and freshwater habitats.

== Description ==
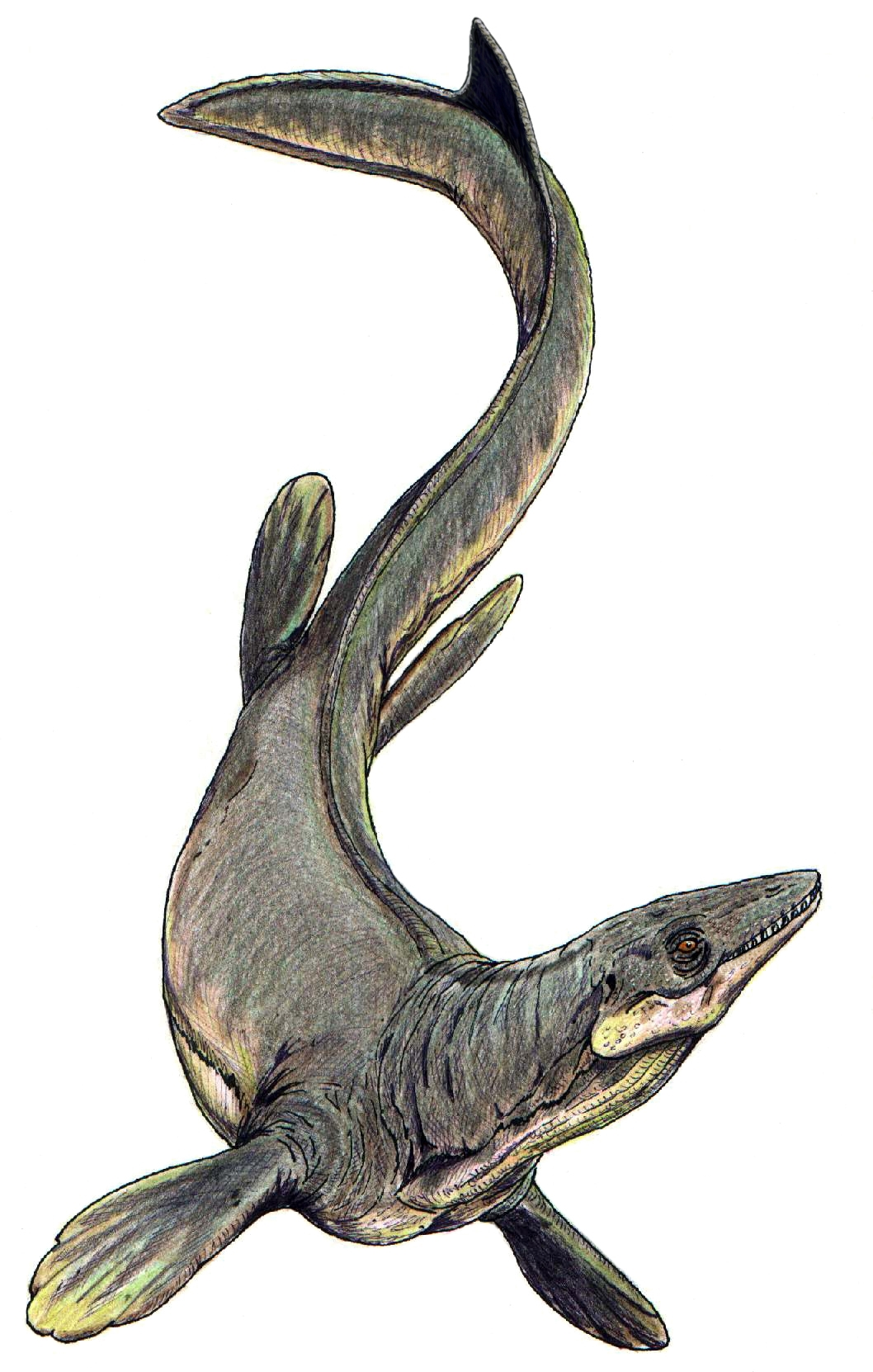
Artist's reconstruction

Plioplatecarpus was a medium-sized mosasaur, with P. marshi measuring 5.5 metres (18 ft) long and P. houzeaui measuring 5–6 metres (16–20 ft) long. The eyes of Plioplatecarpus are proportionally larger than those of many mosasaur genera, although the skull is relatively short. The larger eyes may be an adaptation to low light conditions like those found in deeper water. It has fewer teeth than most mosasaurs, but they are greatly recurved. This suggests that Plioplatecarpus would have hunted relatively small prey that it could grab very precisely. The broad distribution of fossil remains in both North America and Europe suggest that it would have been an open ocean predator.
