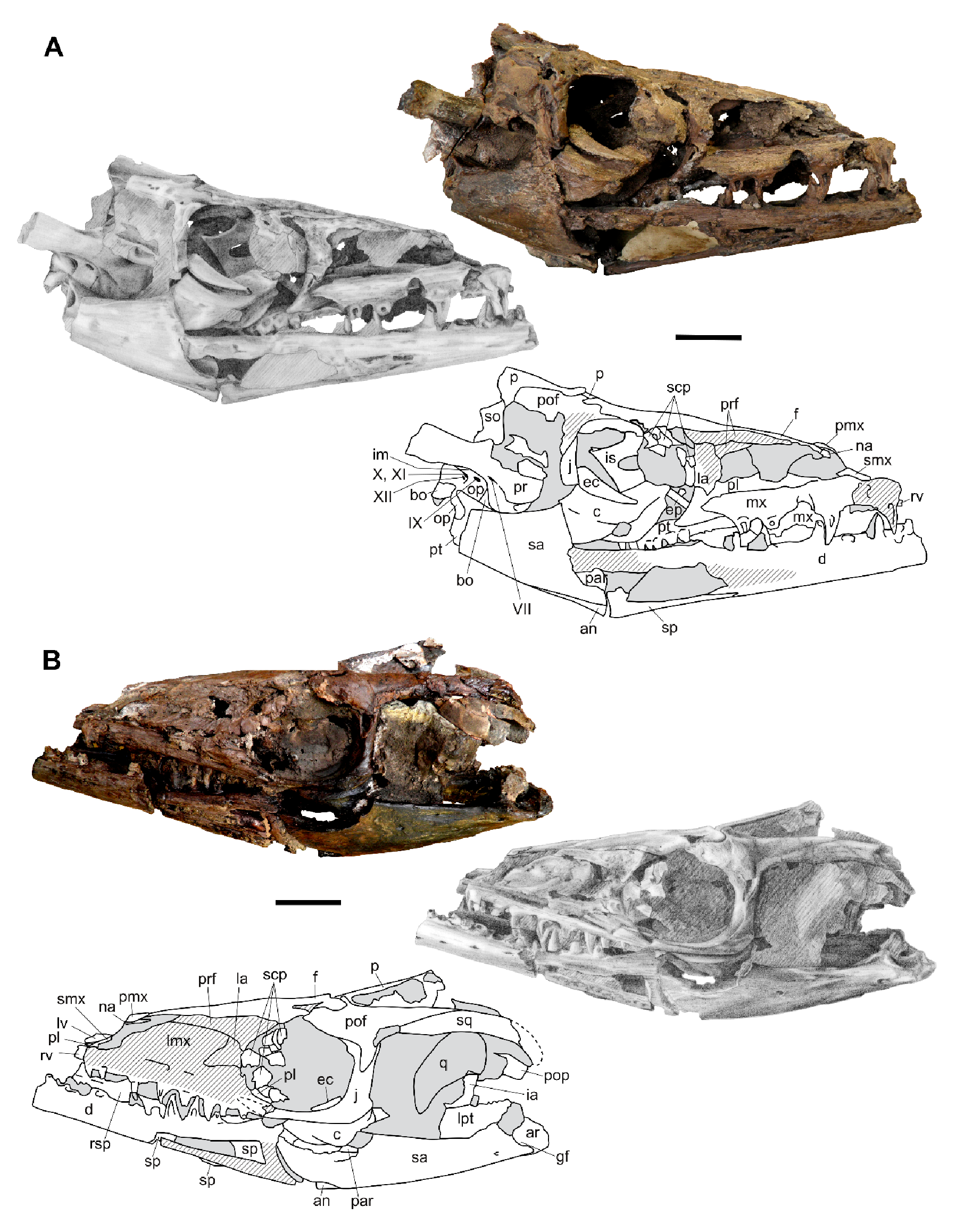
- Holotype skull in right (A) and left (B) lateral views

Scientific classification
- Kingdom: Animalia
- Phylum: Chordata
- Class: Reptilia
- Order: Squamata
- Clade: †Mosasauria
- Family: †Mosasauridae
- Clade: †Russellosaurina
- Subfamily: †Plioplatecarpinae
- Genus: †Oneirosaurus; Páramo-Fonseca et al., 2025
- Species: †O. caballeroi

Binomial name
- †Oneirosaurus caballeroi Páramo-Fonseca et al., 2025

= Oneirosaurus =

Oneirosaurus Temporal range: Late Cretaceous, Coniacian

Extinct genus of mosasaurs

Oneirosaurus (lit. 'dream lizard') is an extinct genus of plioplatecarpine mosasaurid known from the Late Cretaceous (Coniacian age) Galembo Formation of Colombia. The genus contains a single species, Oneirosaurus caballeroi, known from a well-preserved skull and mandible.

== Discovery and naming ==
In 1997, Jaime Caballero reported the discovery of a mosasaur skull to the Servicio Geológico Colombiano (SGC; Colombian Geological Survey). The specimen comprises a nearly complete skull articulated with the mandible and the atlas (first cervical vertebra). It was collected in outcrops of the Galembo Formation ('La Azufrada' locality) near the Barrancabermeja-Bucaramanga highway in Lebrija municipality, Colombia. After Caballero's death, his family donated the specimen to the SGC for study. The SGC subsequently revisited the quarry from which the skull was found and discovered pieces of vertebrae and ribs. It is uncertain if these elements belong to the same individual as the skull. The specimen was initially reported by María Eurídice Páramo-Fonseca in 2012 under the specimen number IPN-2, where it was briefly described as a new specimen generally comparable to—but distinguishable from—Yaguarasaurus columbianus. It is now accessioned under the specimen number IGMp879524 at the José Royo y Gómez National Geological Museum.

In 2025, Páramo-Fonseca and colleagues described Oneirosaurus caballeroi as a new genus and species of mosasaurid, establishing IGMp879524 as the holotype specimen. The generic name, Oneirosaurus, combines the Greek words όνειρο (oneiro), meaning 'dream', and σαῦρος (sauros), meaning "lizard", in reference to the exquisite preservation of the delicate cranial structures in the holotype. The specific name, caballeroi, honors Jaime Caballero, the discoverer of the specimen.

== Classification ==
In their 2025 phylogenetic analysis, Páramo-Fonseca and colleagues recovered Oneirosaurus as a member of the mosasaurid clade Plioplatecarpinae. Their results placed Oneirosaurus as the sister taxon to a clade formed by Dallasaurus, Yaguarasaurus (another Colombian taxon), Russellosaurus, and Romeosaurus, the latter three of which are traditionally regarded as a clade of non-plioplatecarpines, the Yaguarasaurinae. Páramo-Fonseca et al. noted that the skull of Oneirosaurus has anatomy somewhat intermediate between these 'yaguarosaurines' and basal non-plioplatecarpine members of the braoder clade Russellosaurina. The skull is most similar to Yaguarasaurus and the earlier-diverging Angolasaurus. These results are displayed in the cladogram below:

- - Adriosaurus
  - - Dolichosaurus longicollis
    - Komensaurus carrolli
    - Pontosaurus kornhuberi
    - Aigialosauridae
      - Aigialosaurus dalmaticus
      - Opetiosaurus bucchichi
    - Tethysaurinae
      - Pannoniasaurus inexpectatus
      - Tethysaurus nopcsai
    - Halisaurinae
      - Eonatator sternbergii
      - - Eonatator coellensis
        - Halisaurus platyspondylus
    - Natantia
      - - Mosasaurinae
        - Tylosaurinae
        - Plioplatecarpinae
          - - Plesioplatecarpus planifrons
            - - Latoplatecarpus willistoni
              - - Platecarpus tympaniticus
                - Plioplatecarpus
          - - Selmasaurus johnsoni
            - - Angolasaurus bocagei
              - - Ectenosaurus clidastoides
                - - Oneirosaurus caballeroi
                  - - Yaguarasaurus columbianus
                    - - Russellosaurus coheni
                      - - Dallasaurus turneri
                        - Romeosaurus fumanensis

'yaguarasaurines'
