= Garamaudo =

Garamaudo Temporal range: Late Cretaceous (Santonian), 84–83.6 Ma
- Partial mandible of the holotype

Scientific classification
- Kingdom: Animalia
- Phylum: Chordata
- Class: Reptilia
- Order: Squamata
- Clade: †Mosasauria
- Family: †Mosasauridae
- Clade: †Russellosaurina
- Subfamily: †Tethysaurinae
- Genus: †Garamaudo; Bardet et al., 2026
- Species: †G. bauciensis

Binomial name
- †Garamaudo bauciensis Bardet et al., 2026

Extinct genus of mosasaur

Garamaudo (lit. 'beware the cursed one') is an extinct genus of tethysaurine mosasaur known from Late Cretaceous (Santonian age) rocks of France. The genus contains a single species, Garamaudo bauciensis, known from the fragmentary remains of at least four individuals. It inhabited a freshwater environment and likely lacked the paddle-like flippers of more derived mosasaurids.

== Discovery and naming ==
Type locality in southeastern France [★]

The Garamaudo fossil material was discovered in outcrops of the Aix-en-Provence Basin (Bouc-Bel-Air - Sousquières locality) in Bouc-Bel-Air, Bouches-du-Rhône department, in southeastern France. The remains of at least four separate individuals are known from this region, housed at the Departmental Council of Bouches-du-Rhône in Marseille. The most complete of these is CD13-PAL.2018.3.1–3, 5–15, 18, which comprises around 20 elements of a single individual collected by the Museum d'Histoire Naturelle Aix-en-Provence in 1997. These include the posterior part of the left hemimandible, seven vertebrae (five of which are from the neck), six ribs, and much of the right pelvis. Other remains from this outcrop include CD13-PAL.2018.3.1.16, a right humerus found near the previous specimen but likely belonging to a smaller individual, and CD13-PAL.2018.3.1.4, a dorsal vertebra found near these specimens but belonging to a larger individual than either of them. CD13-PAL.2018.3.4, a dorsal vertebra comparable in size to the first individual, was found in an outcrop ~20 metres (66 ft) away.

In 2026, Nathalie Bardet and colleagues described Garamaudo bauciensis as a new genus and species of tethysaurine mosasaur based on these fossil remains, designating the most complete individual as the holotype specimen. The humerus was regarded as a paratype, and the other two vertebrae were treated as referred specimens. The generic name, Garamaudo, is derived from the Provençal expression Gara au maudo, which means 'beware the cursed one', in turn alluding to Garamaudo, a malicious freshwater-dwelling serpentine creature of local legend. The specific name, bauciensis, means 'from Bouc-Bel-Air', referencing the type locality.

== Description ==
Holotype (A–E) and referred (F, G–I) vertebrae

Paratype humerus

Holotype pelvis

The lack of clearly distinct sutures on the mandible and pelvis of the G. bauciensis holotype suggests this individual was skeletally mature at the time it died. The total body length was likely around 2.5 m (8.2 ft), comparable to the closely related Tethysaurus, which has been estimated as being under 3 m (9.8 ft) long. The other named tethysaurine, Pannoniasaurus, was substantially larger, at up to 6 m (20 ft) long. The limbs and pelvic girdle of Garamaudo may have been more plesiomorphic ('primitive') in morphology in contrast to the derived paddle-like flippers of other mosasaurids. The known Garamaudo fossils exhibit clear osteosclerosis (increased bone density), indicating it was likely capable of diving to shallow depths. It may not have been capable of rapid acceleration and maneuverability, instead catching prey by ambush.

== Classification ==
To test the affinities and relationships of Garamaudo, Bardet et al. (2026) included it in an updated version of the phylogenetic matrix of Zietlow et al. (2023). It was recovered in an unresolved clade with Pannoniasaurus, Tethysaurus, and an unnamed taxon from Villeveyrac-L'Olivet, together forming the subfamily Tethysaurinae. Tethysaurinae was recovered as the sister taxon to Yaguarasaurinae, with this clade in a large polytomy of other mosasaurid groups. These results are displayed in the cladogram below:

- Mosasauroidea
  - Aigialosauridae
  - Mosasauridae
    - Haasiasaurus gittelmani
    - - Tethysaurinae
        - Garamaudo bauciensis
        - Pannoniasaurus inexpectatus
        - Tethysaurus nopcsai
        - Villeveyrac-L'Olivet mosasauroid
      - Yaguarasaurinae
        - Romeosaurus fumanensis
        - Russellosaurus coheni
        - Yaguarasaurus columbianus
    - - Carsosaurus marchesetti
      - - Vallecillosaurus donrobertoi
        - - Mosasaurinae
    - - Komensaurus carrolli
      - - Halisaurinae
        - - Plioplatecarpinae
          - Tylosaurinae

== Palaeoenvironment ==
The Bouc-Bel-Air - Sousquières locality, from which Garamaudo is known, represents a freshwater depositional environment. During the late Cretaceous period, this may have been a moderately eutrophic lake with periodic flooding events. Other reptiles known from this formation include small indeterminate crocodylomorphs and a bothremydid turtle tentatively assigned to the genus Polysternon. Other fossils from the locality include fish, such as Atractosteus africanus (a gar) and Axelrodichthys megadromos (a coelacanth).
