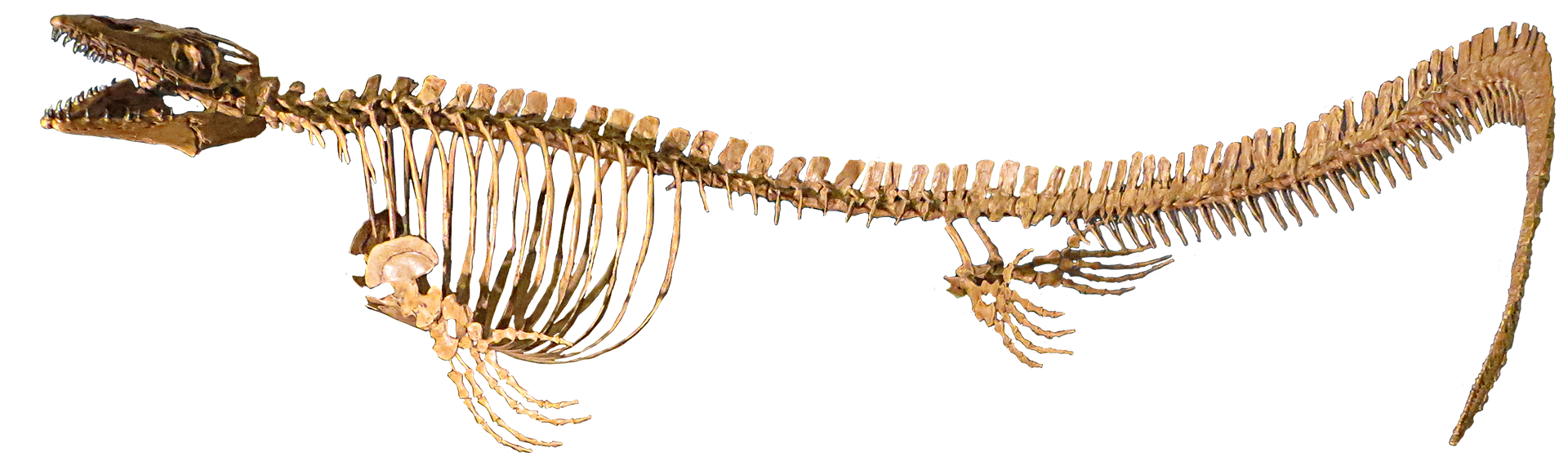
- Cast of P. tympaniticus

Scientific classification
- Kingdom: Animalia
- Phylum: Chordata
- Class: Reptilia
- Order: Squamata
- Clade: †Mosasauria
- Family: †Mosasauridae
- Clade: †Russellosaurina
- Subfamily: †Plioplatecarpinae
- Genus: †Platecarpus; Cope, 1869
- Species: †P. tympaniticus

Binomial name
- †Platecarpus tympaniticus Cope, 1869

Synonyms
- Platecarpus coryphaeus Platecarpus ictericus

= Platecarpus =

Platecarpus Temporal range: Late Cretaceous, 84–81 Ma Possible late Campanian record

Extinct genus of lizards

Platecarpus ("oar wrist") is an extinct genus of aquatic lizards belonging to the mosasaur family, living around 84–81 million years ago during the middle Santonian to early Campanian, of the Late Cretaceous period. Fossils have been found in the United States and possibly in Belgium, Australia, and Africa. A well-preserved specimen of Platecarpus shows that it fed on moderate-sized fish, and it has been hypothesized to have fed on squid and ammonites as well. Like other mosasaurs, it was initially thought to have swum in an eel-like fashion, although another study suggests that it swam more like modern sharks. An exceptionally well-preserved specimen of Platecarpus, known as LACM 128319, shows skin impressions, pigments around the nostrils, bronchial tubes, and the presence of a high-profile tail fluke, showing that it and other mosasaurs did not necessarily have an eel-like swimming method, but were more powerful, fast swimmers. It is held in the Natural History Museum of Los Angeles County. Isotopic analysis on teeth specimens has suggested that this genus and Clidastes may have entered freshwater occasionally, just like modern sea snakes.

== Description ==
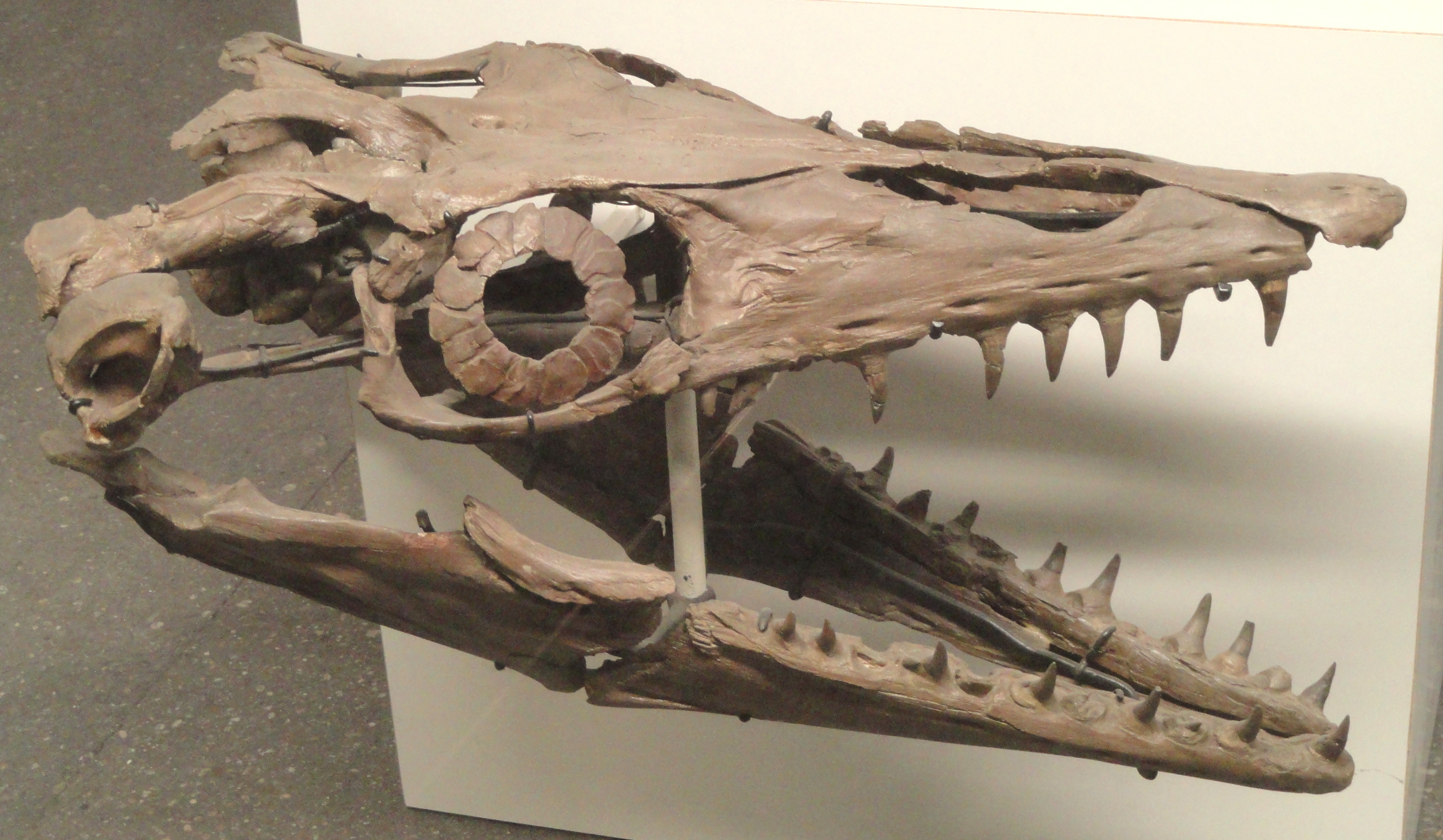
Skull in Naturmuseum Senckenberg

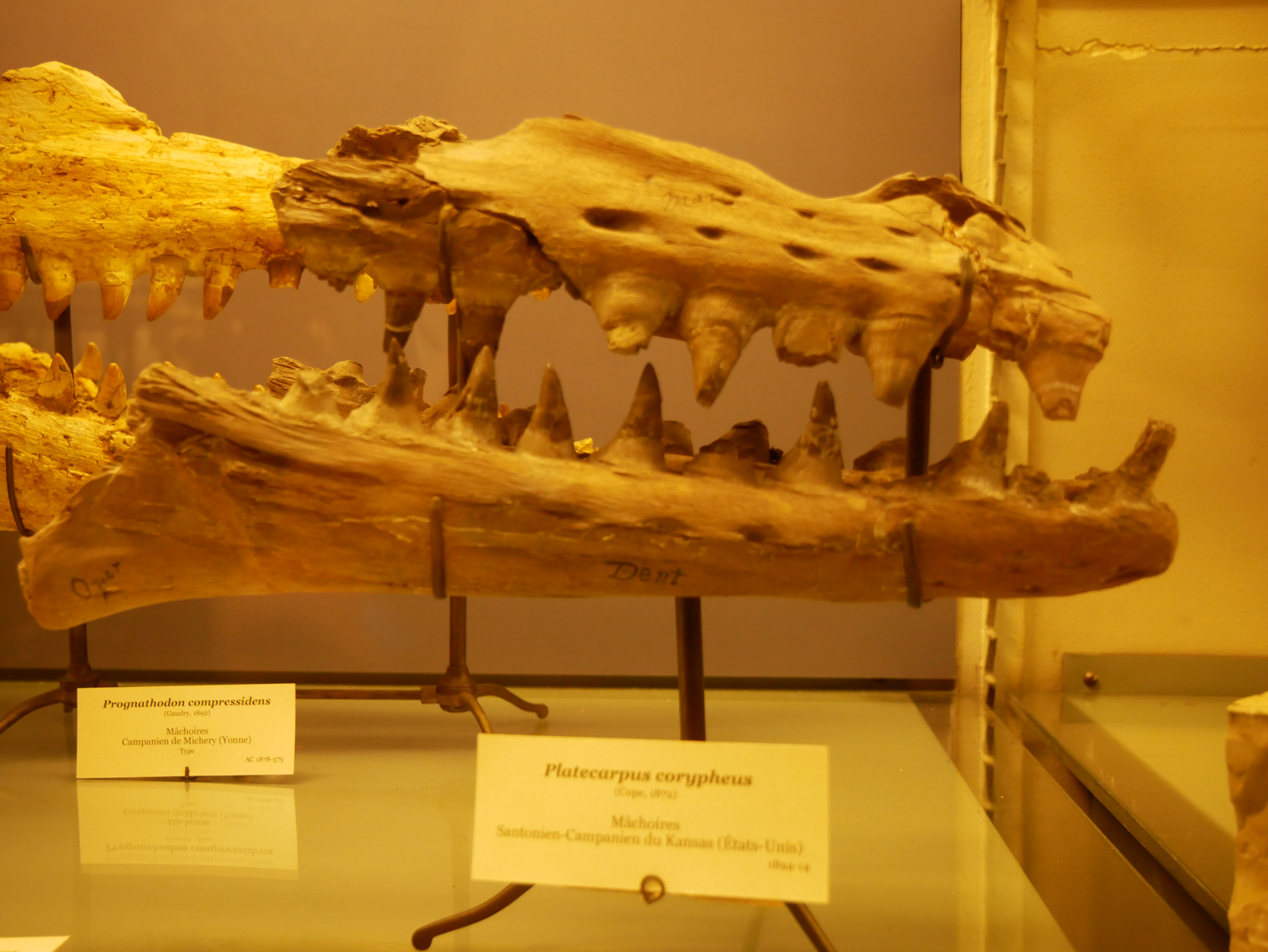
P. coryphaeus jaws

Platecarpus had a long, down-turned tail with a large dorsal lobe on it, steering flippers, and jaws lined with conical teeth. A complete specimen LACM 128319 shows that it grew up to 5.57–5.67 m (18.3–18.6 ft) long and weighed around 548 kg (1,208 lb).^{Extended Data 1} The platecarpine mosasaurs had evolved into the very specialized plioplatecarpine group by the end of the Cretaceous.

The skull structure of Platecarpus is unique among mosasaurs. This genus is characterized by a short skull, and has fewer teeth than any other mosasaur (around 10 teeth in each dentary). (Note: Burnham (1991) reported an unclassified species of Plioplatecarpus from the Lower Demopolis Formation in Alabama that has a lower number of teeth in its jaws.) LACM 128319 preserves matter within the scleral ring that may possibly be the retina of the eye. Small structures in the retina, each around 2 μm long and observed by scanning electron microspectroscopy, may represent retinal melanosomes preserved in their original positions.

Size comparison

The respiratory tube is also known in LACM 128319, preserved as cartilaginous tracheal rings. Only the posterior-most end of the tracheal tube – at the end of the neck near the pectoral girdle – is known. The section where the two bronchi split was also preserved in the specimen, but was destroyed during excavation. This is an indication that Platecarpus and other mosasaurs had two functional lungs. Snakes, which are closely related to mosasaurs, have only one functional lung with the second often being vestigial or absent. Unlike terrestrial lizards, however, the bronchi separate in front of the area of the forelimbs rather than at the level of the limbs.

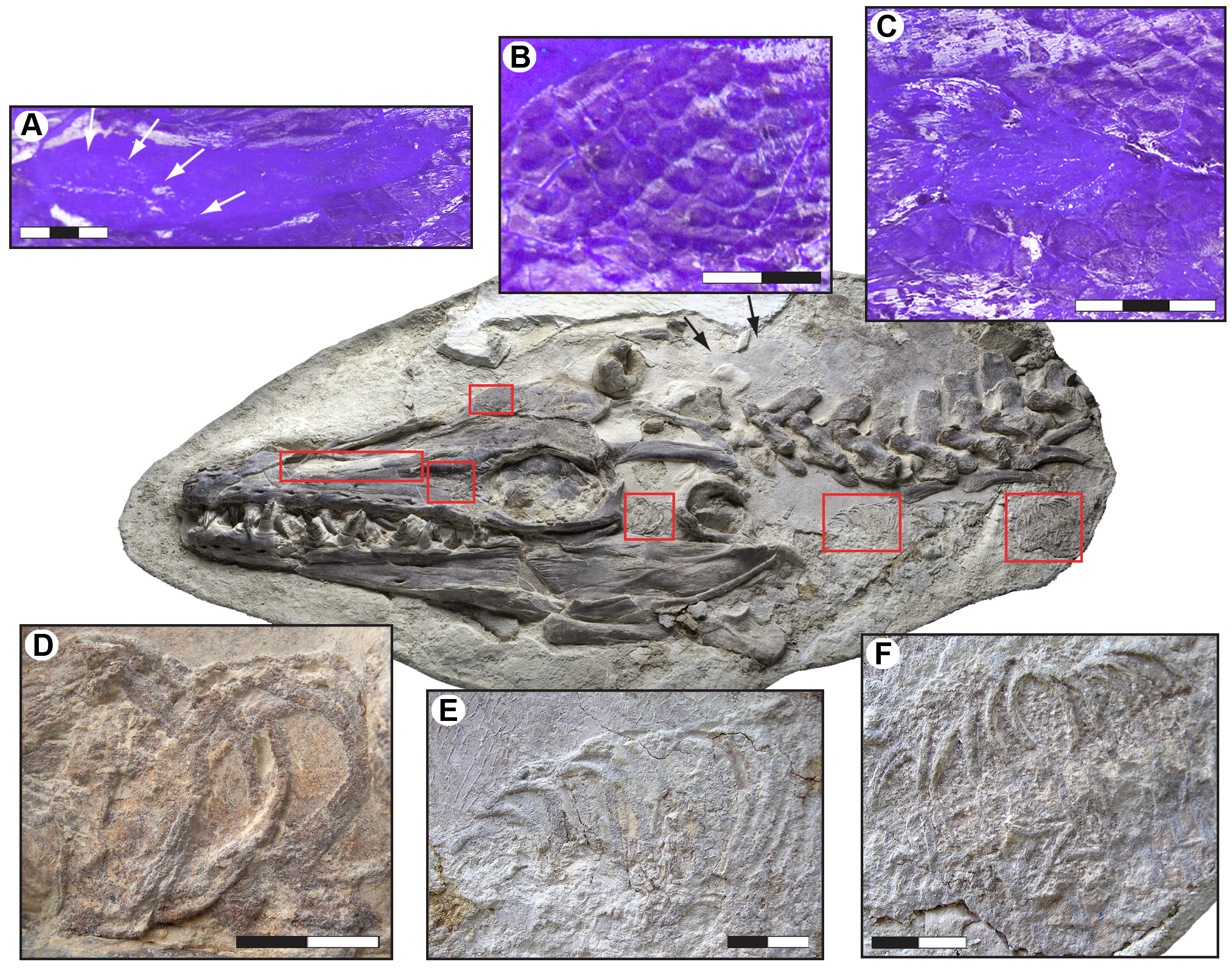
Soft tissues in the head and neck of specimen LACM 128319: Tracheal rings are shown in the bottom three photographs.

Skin impressions are known from Platecarpus, preserved in LACM 128319 as soft impressions and phosphate material. Scales on the tip of the snout and the top of the skull are somewhat hexagonal in shape and do not touch one another. The scales on the jaws are longer and rhomboidal in shape, overlapping one another. The scales on the snout indicate that the nostrils were placed far in front of the skull at its tip and faced laterally as in most squamates and archosaurs. The body scales are all rhomboidal in shape and form tightly connecting diagonal rows that overlap each other at their posterior edges. They are generally the same size throughout the entire length of the body. The caudal scales on the tail are taller and larger than those of the rest of the body, although those covering the lower surface of the tail are more similar to body scales.

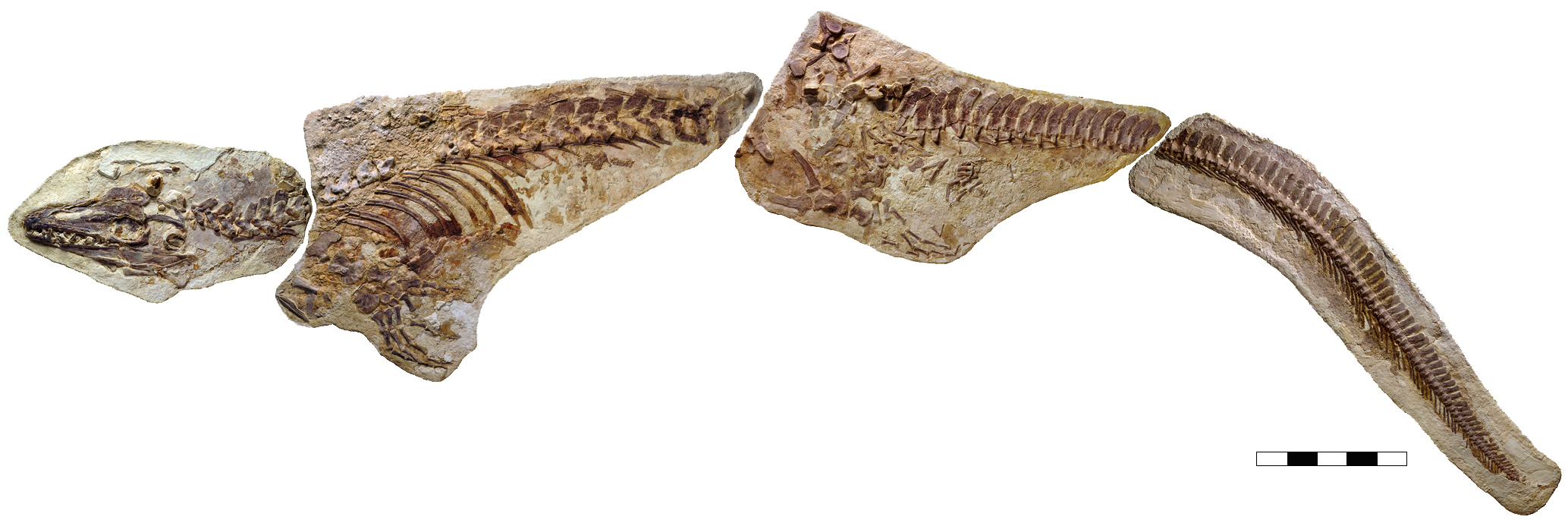
LACM 128319

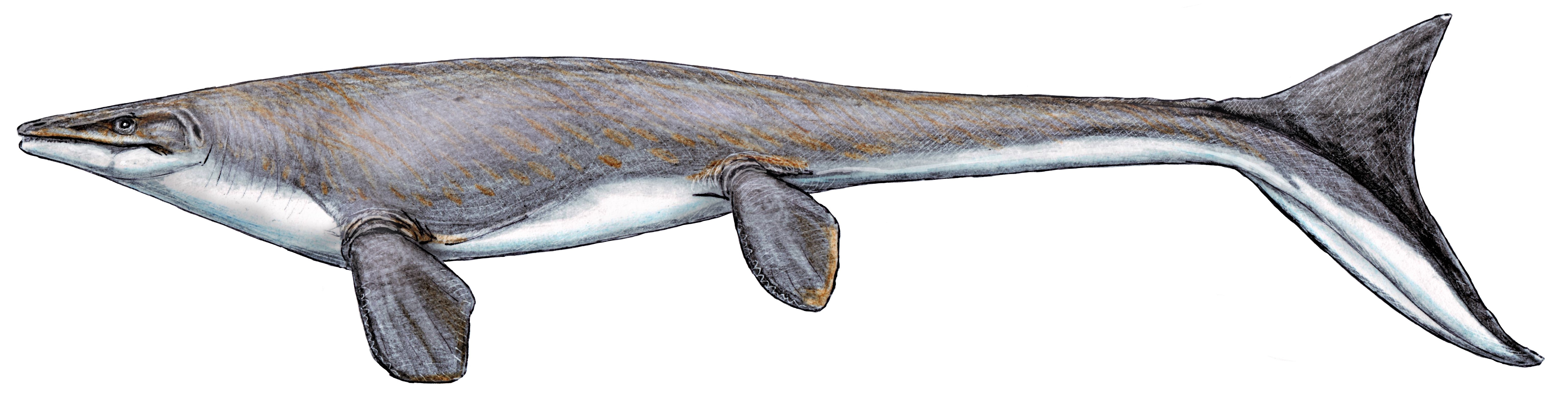
Life reconstruction of same specimen

Internal organs, or viscera, may also be preserved in the specimen as reddish areas. One is located in the thoracic cavity low in the ribcage, while the other is located in the upper portion of the abdominal cavity just behind the ribcage. The reddish areas were analysed with mass spectrometry and were shown to contain high levels of compounds made of iron and porphyrin. These substances are evidence of hemoglobin decomposition products that may have formed in the organs as they decomposed. Based on its position, the organ in the thoracic cavity is probably the heart or liver, or even both of those organs. The organ in the abdominal cavity may be a kidney, although it is in a more anterior position than the kidneys of monitor lizards, mosasaurs' closest living relatives. The anterior position of the kidneys may have been an adaptation toward a more streamlined body, as their presumed position is similar to that of cetaceans.

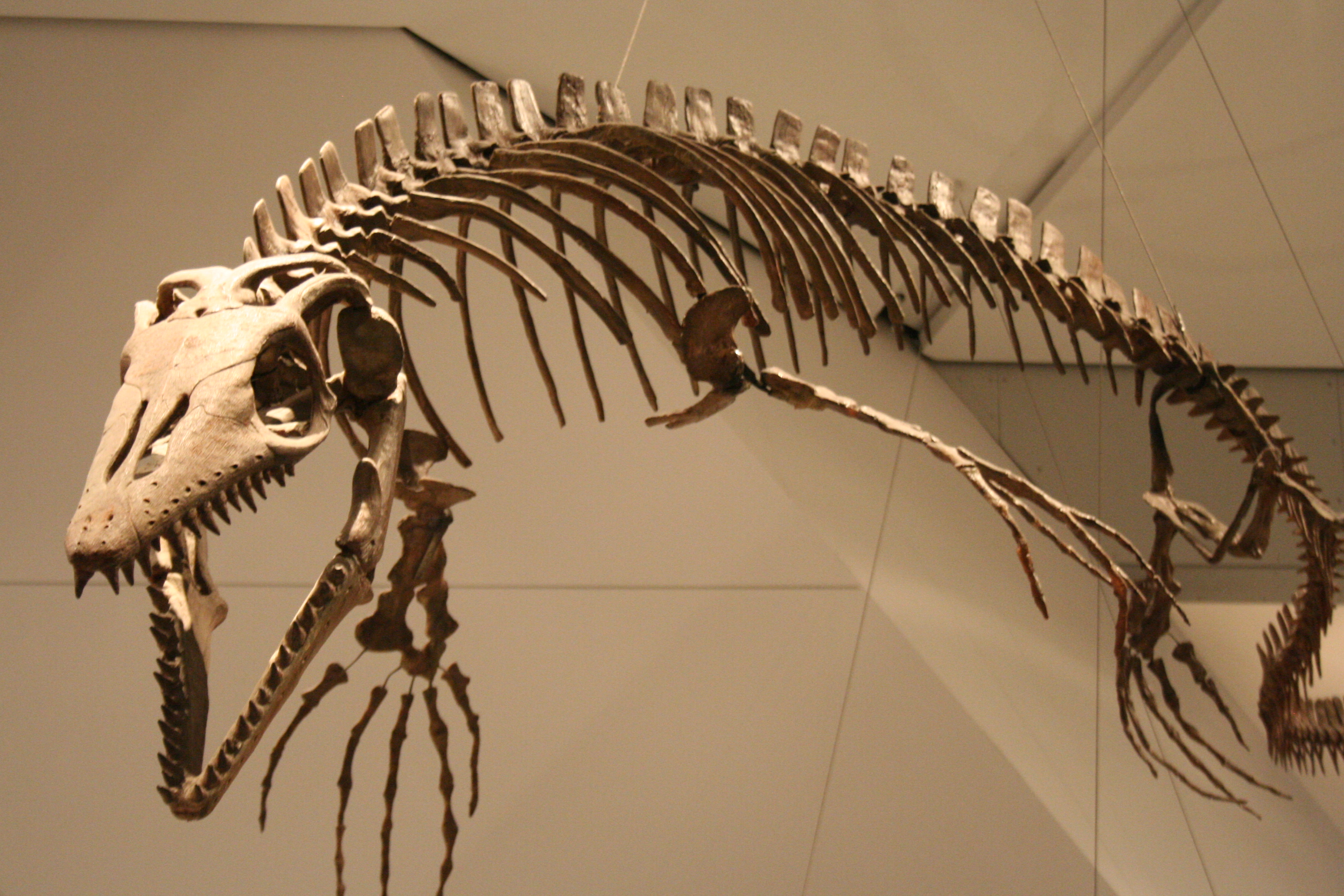
Reconstructed Platecarpus skeleton

Part of the digestive tract is also preserved and is filled with mid-sized fish remains. The shape of these remains may outline the true shape of the corresponding part of the digestive tract, most likely the colon. The presence of scales and undigested bones in the colon suggests that Platecarpus and other mosasaurs processed food quickly and did not thoroughly digest and absorb all food in the gastrointestinal tract. Coprolites from the mosasaur Globidens are also suggestive of low digestion and absorption rates as they contain masses of crushed bivalve shells.

The caudal, or tail vertebrae, are sharply downturned. The vertebrae at the bend (called the caudal peduncle) are wedge-shaped with neural spines that are wider at their ends than they are at their bases. This downturned area likely supported a fluke similar to modern sharks. Two lobes would have been present, a lower one supported by the downturned vertebrae and an upper, unsupported one. The tail fluke was probably hypocercal, meaning that its lower lobe was longer than its upper lobe. This condition is also seen in ichthyosaurs and metriorhynchid crocodyliforms.

== History ==
=== Fossils ===
Various skeletons of this mosasaur have been found in Cretaceous deposits in Kansas, but only one complete skull has ever been recovered. Platecarpus fossils have been found in rocks that date back to the late Santonian through the early Campanian in the Smoky Hill Chalk.

=== Taxonomic history ===
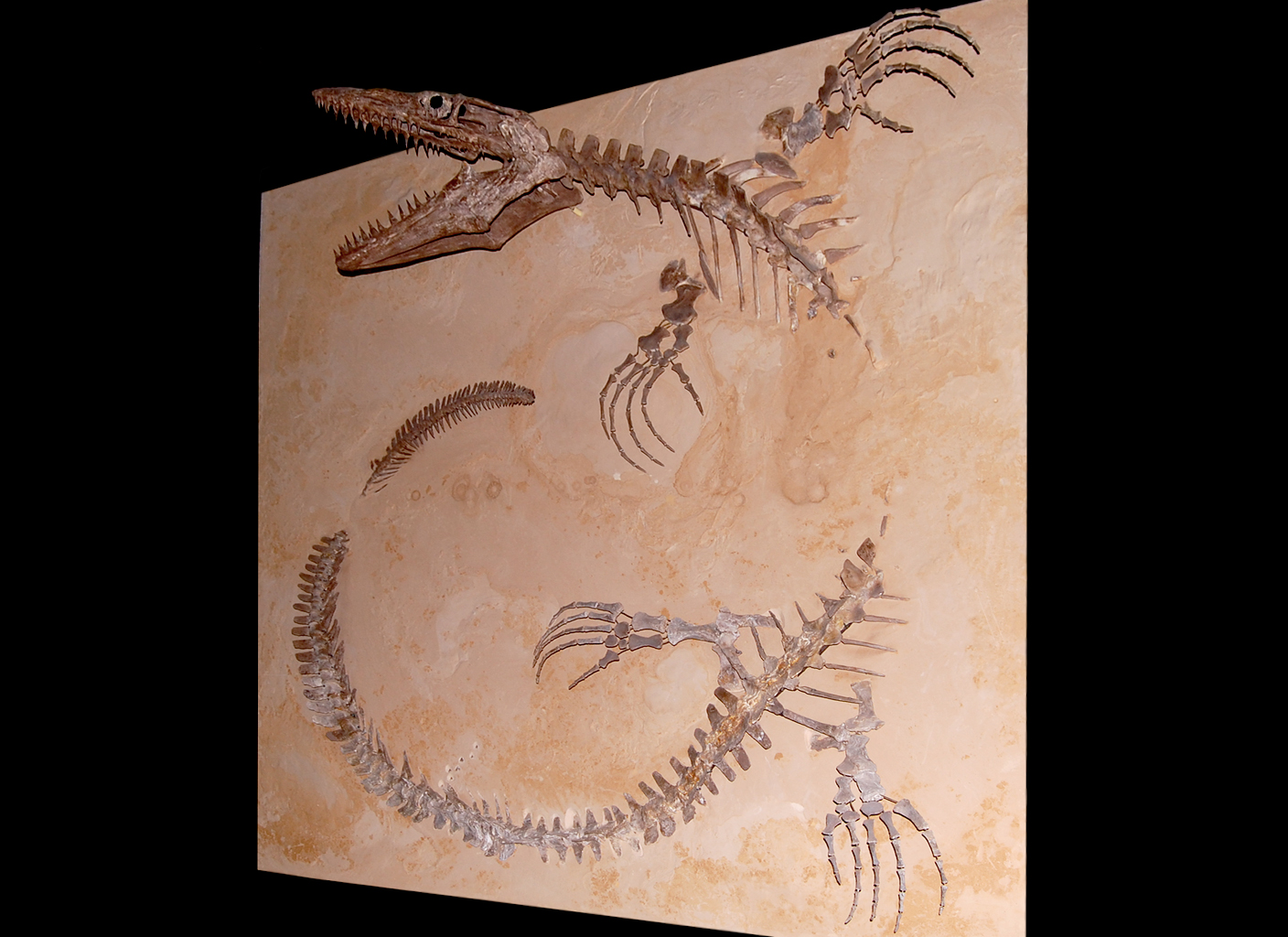
Skeleton in Naturhistorisches Museum Wien

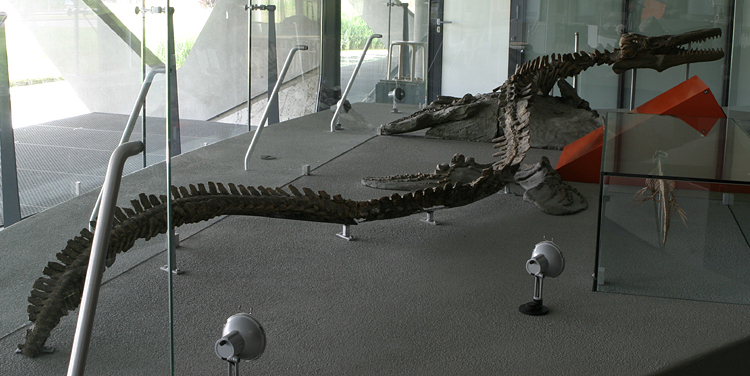
Specimen in Naturalis in Leiden formerly referred to P. ictericus

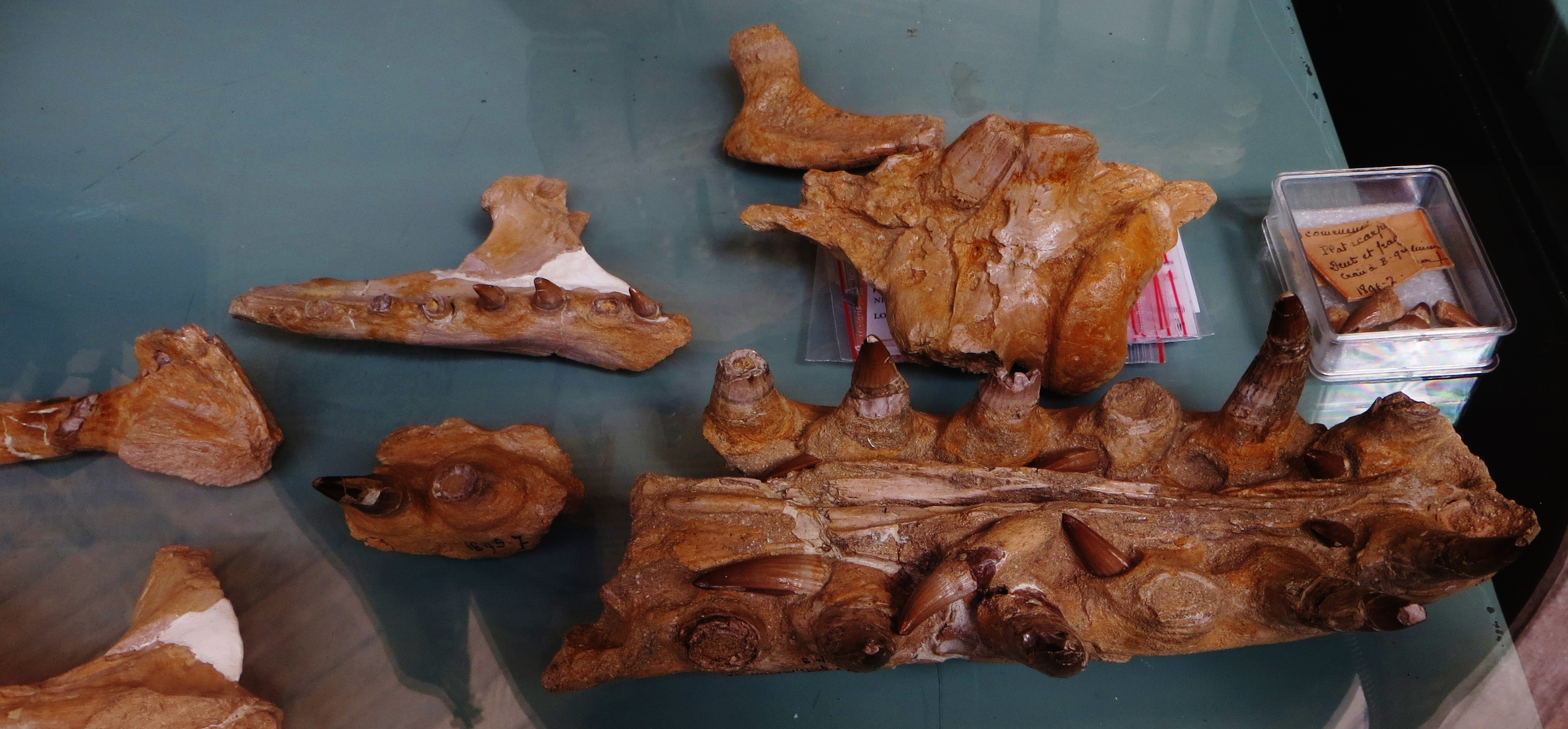
P. somenensis type specimen

Platecarpus was often regarded as the most common genus of mosasaur in the Western Interior Sea during the deposition of the Smoky Hill Chalk in Kansas, and Platecarpus ictericus was regarded as the most commonly occurring species. However, scientists now consider it to be of the paraphyletic genus. Therefore, some species were reassigned to their own genera. The type specimen of Platecarpus planifrons was discovered by Professor B. F. Mudge and was classified by Edward Drinker Cope as Clidastes planifrons. In 1898, on further analysis of the remains, it was determined that the mosasaur be placed in the genus Platecarpus. The type specimen underwent another taxonomic review in 1967, when paleontologist Dale Russell determined that the remains were too fragmentary to place within any genus, and deemed it a specimen of "uncertain taxonomic position". A 2006 discovery in the Smoky Hill Chalk of Kansas re-affirmed this position with the discovery a complete fossilized skull being unearthed. In 2011, a new generic name, Plesioplatecarpus, was erected by Takuya Konishi and Michael W. Caldwell to incorporate P. planifrons, which they found was distinct from Platecarpus in a phylogenetic analysis. In 1994, Angolasaurus was synonymized with this genus. However, many recent studies re-validate this genus. Furthermore, Platecarpus is considered monotypic, as P. coryphaeus and P. ictericus were synonymized with its type species, P. tympaniticus.

The cladogram below follows the most resolved topology from a 2011 analysis by paleontologists Takuya Konishi and Michael W. Caldwell.

- - Clidastes propython
  - - Kourisodon puntledgensis
    - Russellosaurina
      - - Yaguarasaurus columbianus
        - - Russellosaurus coheni
          - Tethysaurus nopcsai
      - - - Tylosaurus kansasensis
          - Tylosaurus proriger
        - Plioplatecarpinae
          - Ectenosaurus clidastoides
          - - Angolasaurus bocagei
            - - - Selmasaurus johnsoni
                - Selmasaurus russelli
              - - Plesioplatecarpus planifrons
                - - Platecarpus tympaniticus
                  - - Latoplatecarpus willistoni
                    - - - Latoplatecarpus nichollsae
                        - Platecarpus somenensis
                      - - Plioplatecarpus primaevus
                        - - Plioplatecarpus houzeaui
                          - Plioplatecarpus marshi

== Paleobiology ==
=== Diet ===
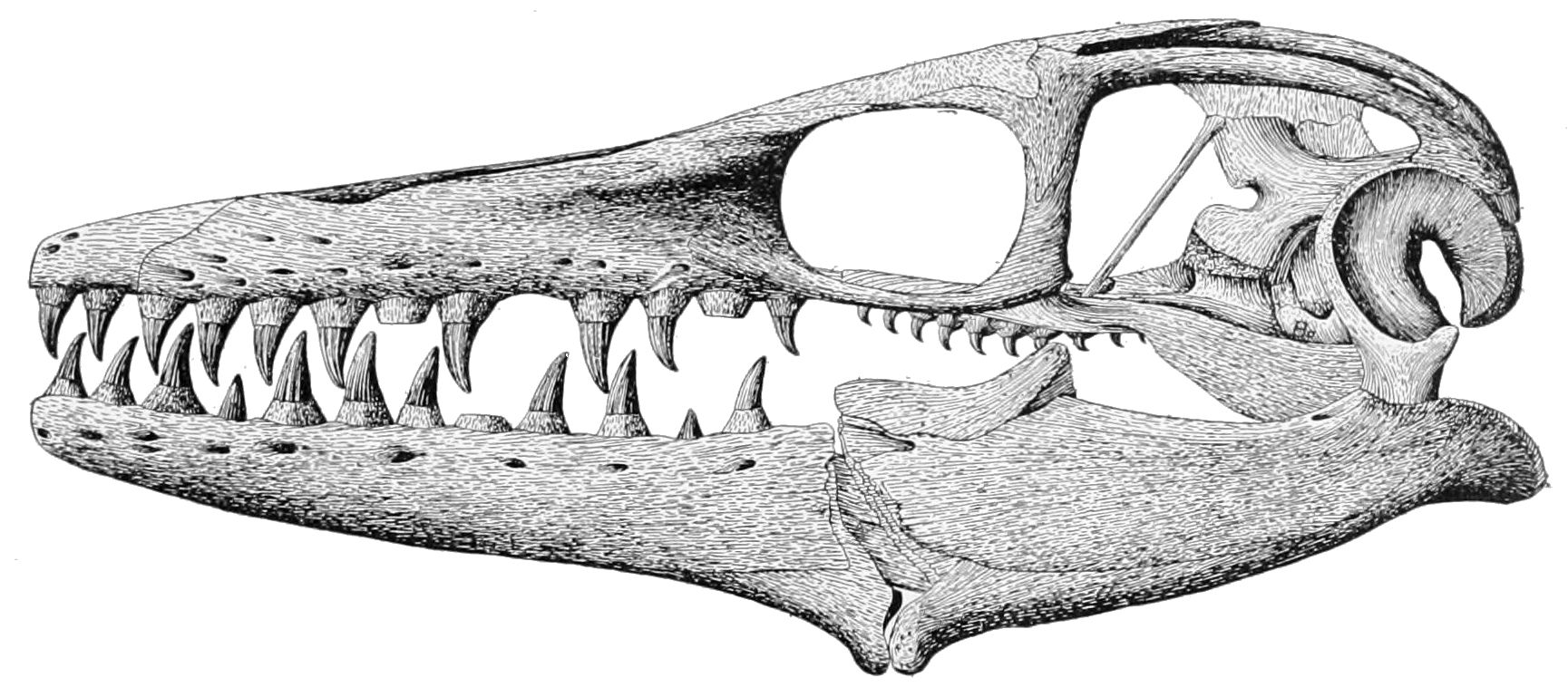
Restoration of the skull, showing dentition

Compared to the tylosaurs, plioplatecarpine mosasaurs had much less robust teeth, suggesting that they fed on smaller (or softer) prey such as small fish and squid.

=== Locomotion ===
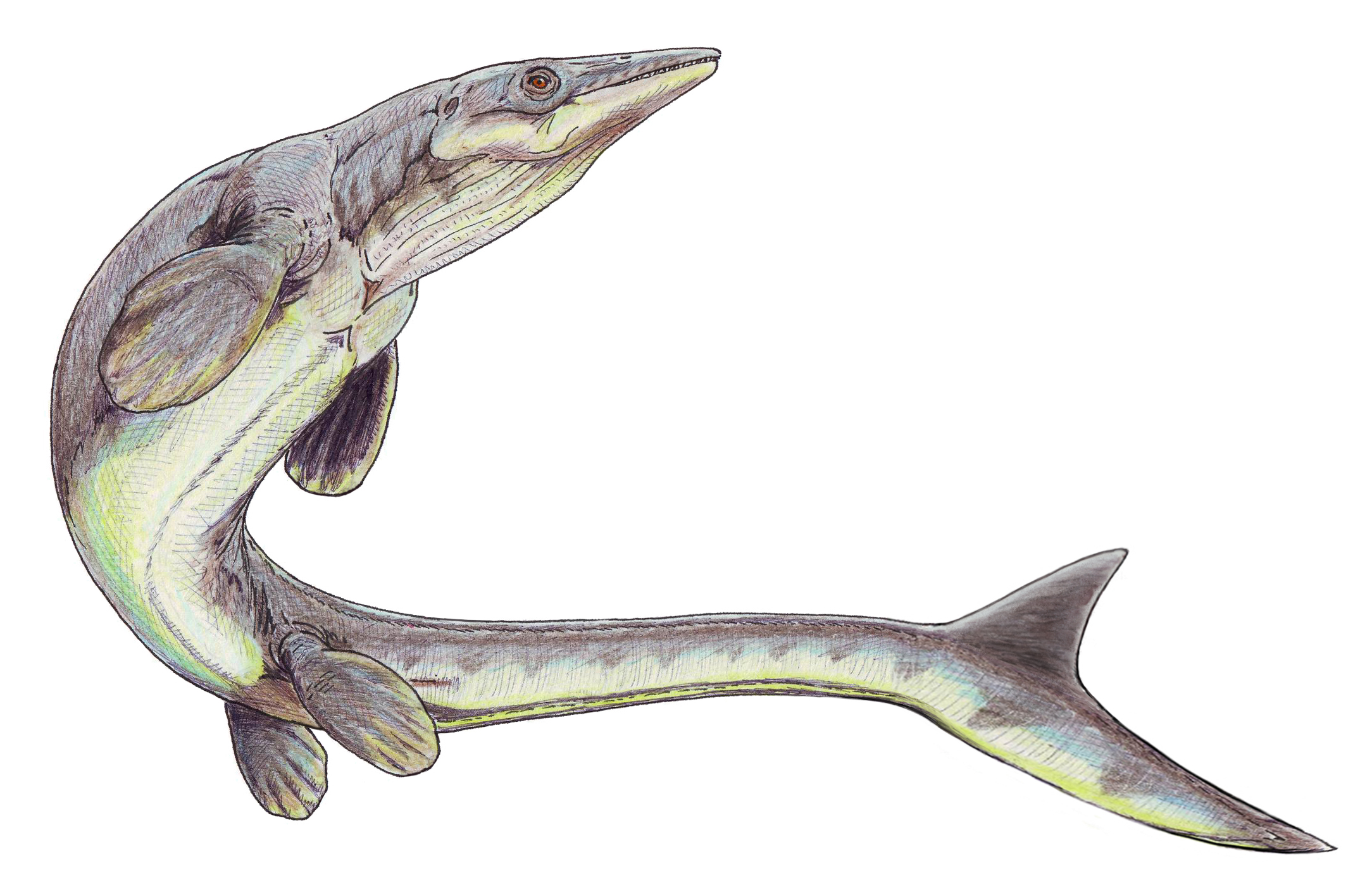
Restoration

While mosasaurs are traditionally thought to have propelled themselves through the water by lateral undulation in a similar way to eels, the deep caudal fin of Platecarpus suggests that it swam more like a shark. The downturned caudal vertebrae of Platecarpus suggest it had a crescent-shaped tail fluke. At the point of the tail where the fluke begins the vertebral centra are shortened and disk-like. Their reduced size likely allowed for greater flexibility at an area that would have experienced high stresses during swimming. The neural spines of these vertebrae also have grooves for the insertion of interspinal ligaments and dorsal connective tissues which would have aided in lateral movement of the fluke. The ligaments were probably made of collagenous fibers that acted as springs to move the tail back into a resting position after energy was stored in them. These types of ligaments work in some living fish to conserve energy during repetitive bending of the tail. While the fluke and back of the tail undulated in Platecarpus, the base of the tail remained stable. This form of movement is known as carangiform locomotion.

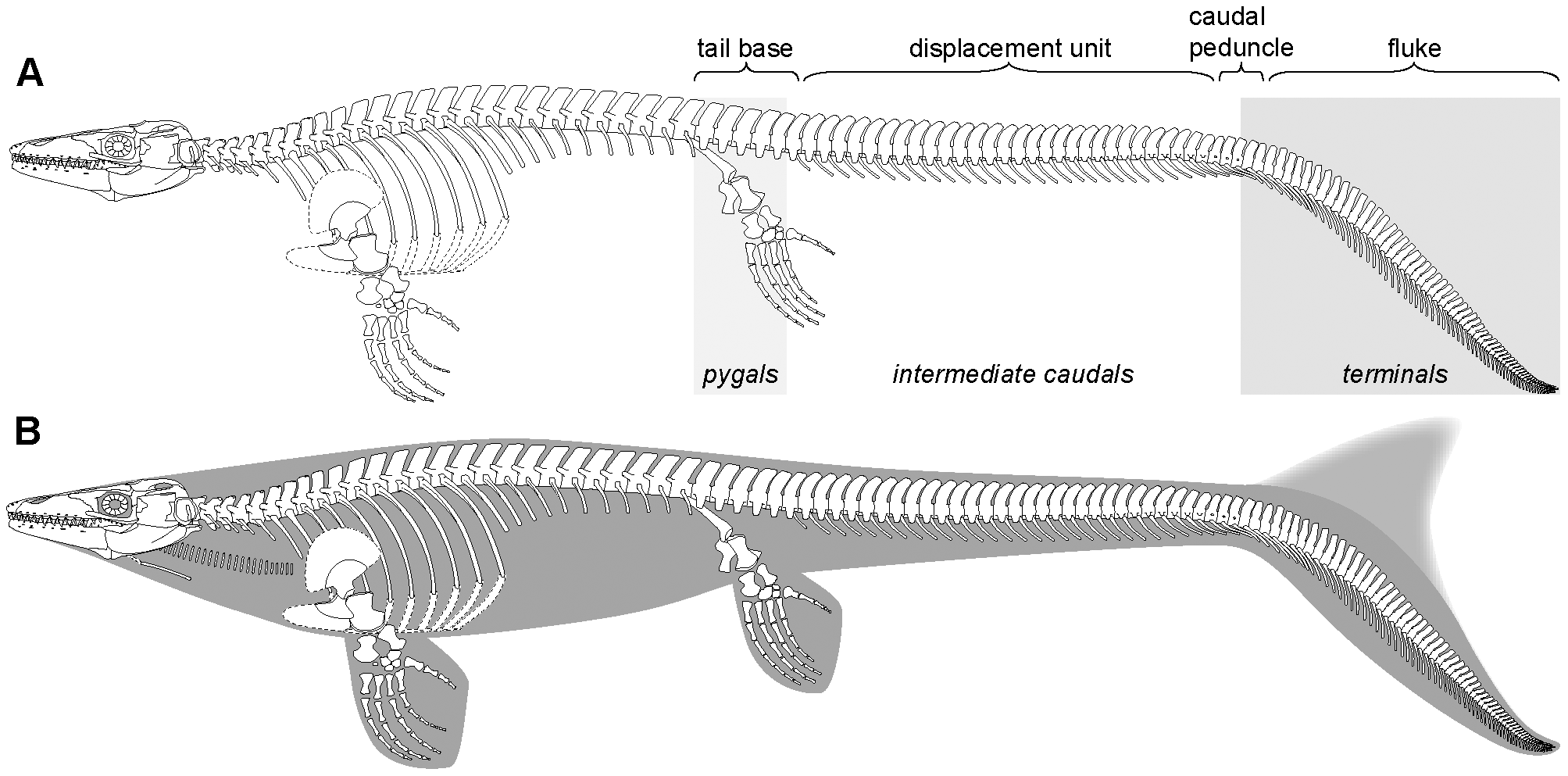
Reconstruction showing bi-lobed tail fluke

The structure of the scales of Platecarpus may have been another adaptation toward a marine lifestyle. The small size and similar shape of these scales throughout the body would have stiffened the trunk, making it more resistant to lateral movement. This stiffness would have improved hydrodynamic efficiency by improving the flow of water across the body. The early mosasauroid Vallecillosaurus also preserves body scales, but they are larger and more varied in shape, suggesting that the animal relied on undulatory movement in its trunk rather than just its tail. Plotosaurus, a more derived mosasaur than Platecarpus, has even smaller scales covering its body, indicating that it had even more efficient locomotion in the water.

=== Metabolism ===
A 2026 study reconstructed the thermoregulatory modes of Platecarpus and the related Tylosaurus from the Smoky Hill Chalk Member of the Niobrara Formation on the basis stable oxygen isotope composition of their tooth enamel, which was interpreted as consistent with endothermy.
