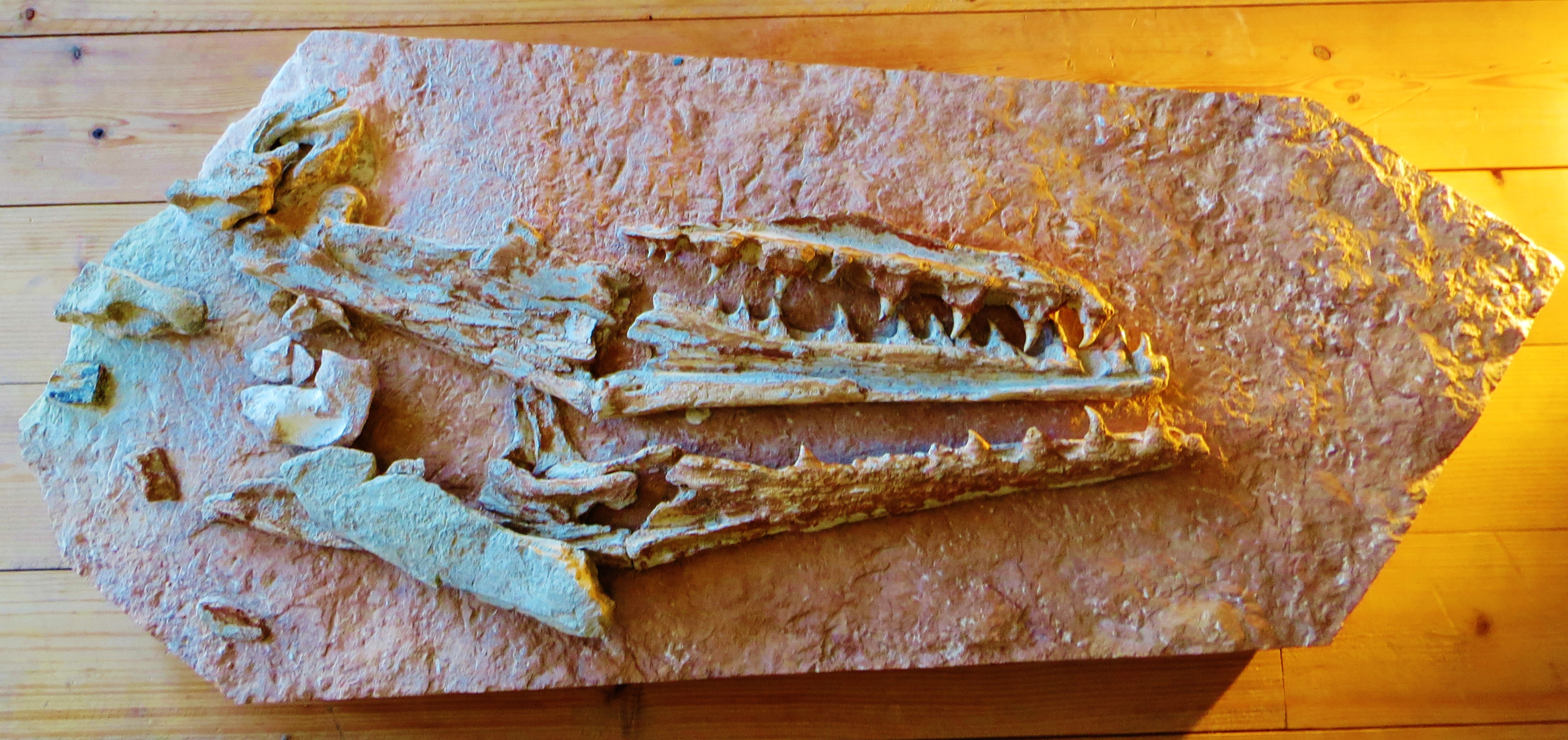
- R. fumanensis skull

Scientific classification
- Kingdom: Animalia
- Phylum: Chordata
- Class: Reptilia
- Order: Squamata
- Clade: †Mosasauria
- Family: †Mosasauridae
- Clade: †Russellosaurina
- Subfamily: †Yaguarasaurinae
- Genus: †Romeosaurus; Palci et al., 2013

Species
- †Romeosaurus fumanensis Palci et al., 2013 (type species); †Romeosaurus sorbinii Palci et al., 2013

= Romeosaurus =

Romeosaurus Temporal range: Late Cretaceous, Turonian–Santonian

Extinct genus of reptiles

Romeosaurus is an extinct genus of yaguarasaurine mosasaur known from the early Late Cretaceous "Lastame" lithotype (lower Turonian to lower Santonian) of northern Italy. It contains two species, Romeosaurus sorbinii and Romeosaurus fumanensis. Of the 2 species, R. sorbinii is known only through very fragmented fossil records of a single specimen and is otherwise poorly described. R. fumanensis is known through more specimens found across a small geographic area in Italy.

Of all specimens recovered, none had well enough preserved post-cranial fossils to make good judgments of their post-cranial anatomy. As of 2018, only 1 specimen of R. sorbinii and 4 specimens of R. fumanensis were known.

== Etymology ==
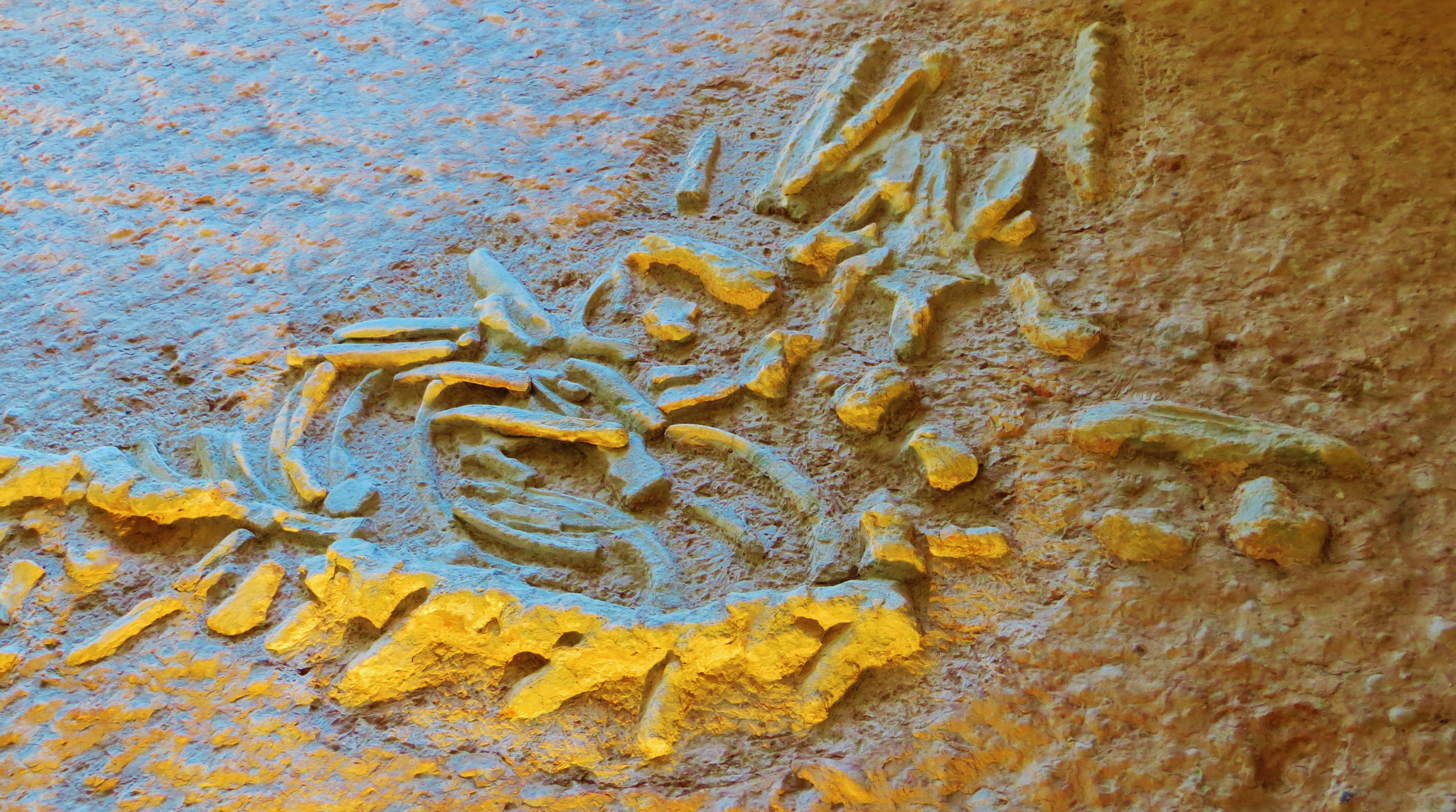
R. fumanensis skeleton

The genus is named after the character Romeo in William Shakespeare's Romeo and Juliet, due to the proximity of the locations of the fossils to Verona, where the play is set. R. sorbinii is named after Lorenzo Sorbini, an Italian paleontologist, whilst R. fumanensis is named after Fumane, a comune in the Province of Verona.

== Phylogeny ==
- Russellosaurina
  - Tethysaurinae
  - - Yaguarasaurus columbianus
    - - Russellosaurus coheni
      - - Romeosaurus fumenensis
        - Romeosaurus sorbinii
