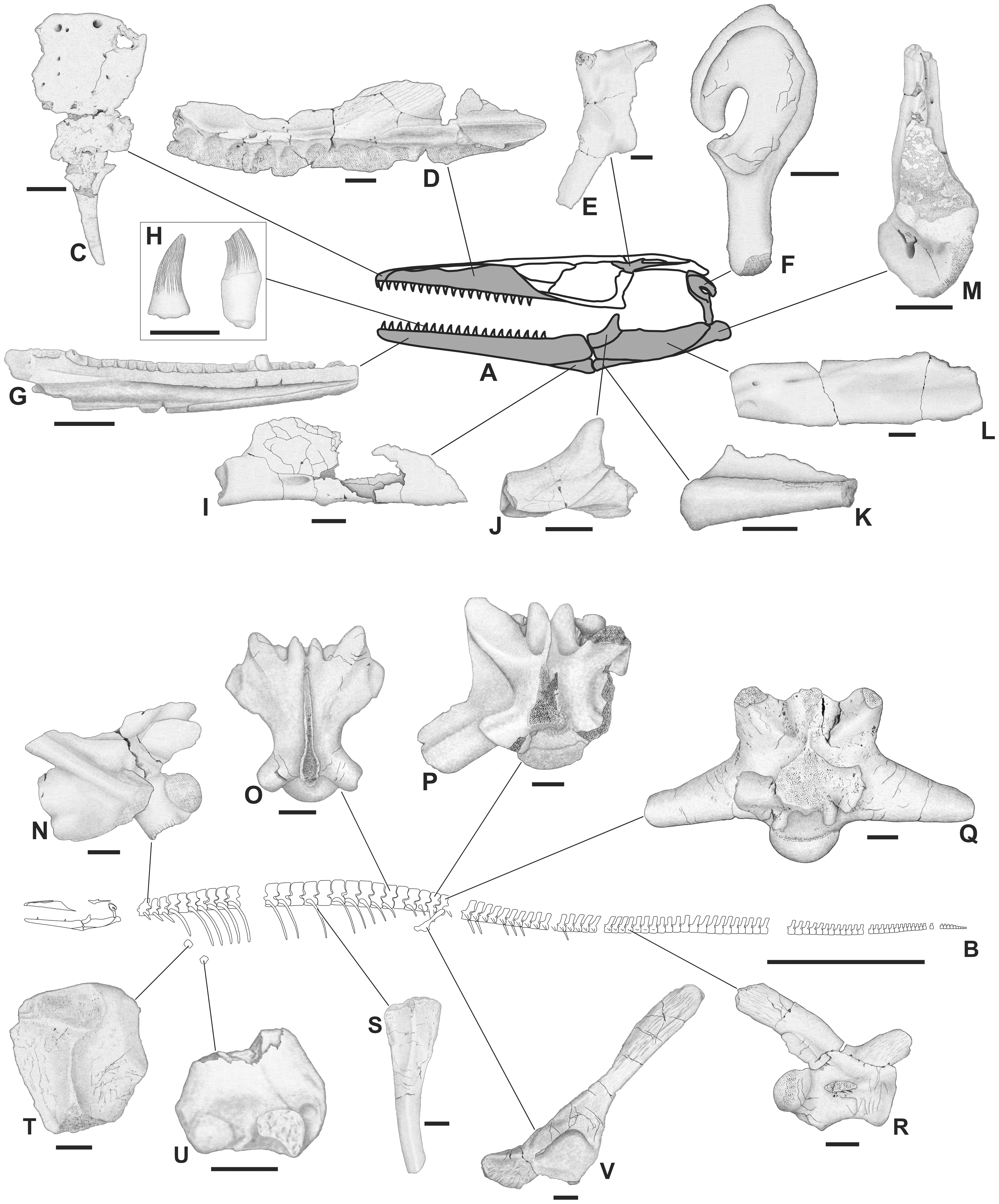
- Known remains and skeletal restorations

Scientific classification
- Kingdom: Animalia
- Phylum: Chordata
- Class: Reptilia
- Order: Squamata
- Clade: †Mosasauria
- Family: †Mosasauridae
- Clade: †Russellosaurina
- Subfamily: †Tethysaurinae
- Genus: †Pannoniasaurus; Makádi, Caldwell & Ősi, 2012

Type species
- †Pannoniasaurus inexpectatus Makádi, Caldwell & Ősi, 2012

= Pannoniasaurus =

Pannoniasaurus Temporal range: Late Cretaceous, 85.3–83.5 Ma

Extinct genus of lizards

Pannoniasaurus is an extinct genus of tethysaurine mosasauroid known from the Late Cretaceous Csehbánya Formation and Ajka Coal Formation (Santonian stage) of Hungary. It contains a single species, Pannoniasaurus inexpectatus, dubbed "unexpected" because it was discovered in freshwater sediments, unlike other mosasaurs, which were marine predators. It was a medium-sized mosasaur, reaching up to 6 metres (20 ft) in length.

== Discovery and naming ==
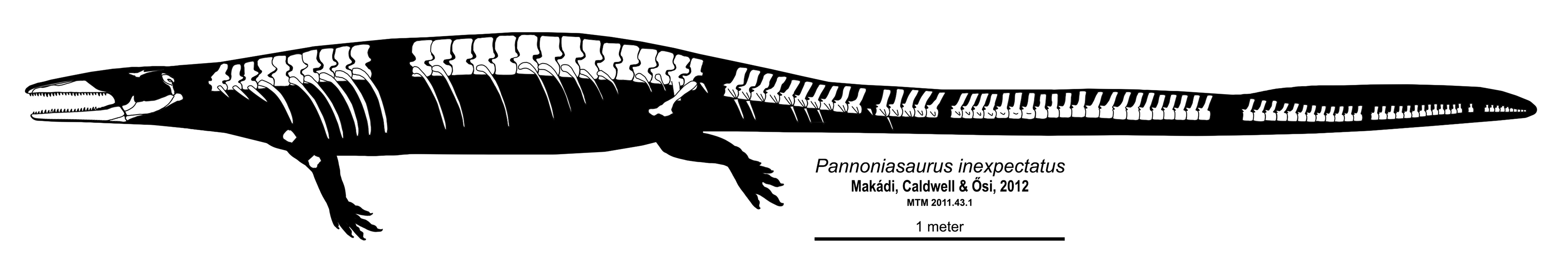
Skeletal diagram of Pannoniasaurus inexpectatus, restored with primitive aigialosaur-style limbs

The holotype (MTM 2011.43.1) and referred specimens have been collected from the alluvial sediments of the Csehbánya Formation from various exposures at the Iharkút open-pit bauxite mine, Bakony Hills, Western Hungary since the discovery of the locality in 2000. Pannoniasaurus inexpectatus was then named and described by Makádi, Caldwell & Ősi (2012).

Since then, more than one hundred bones of Pannoniasaurus, sourced from a large number of individuals of differing age classes, are known from the alluvial flood-plain deposits that comprise the Csehbánya Formation.

A single vertebra (MTM V.2000.21) was collected in 1999 from the Ajka Coal Formation at the waste dump of the coal mines next to the town of Ajka, 20 km from Iharkút. It was described as belonging to cf. Pannoniasaurus by Makádi, Caldwell & Ősi (2012), and then was classified as Pannoniasaurus inexpectatus by Ősi et al. (2016).

All specimens of Pannoniasaurus are currently housed in the Hungarian Natural History Museum, Budapest, Hungary.

== Description ==
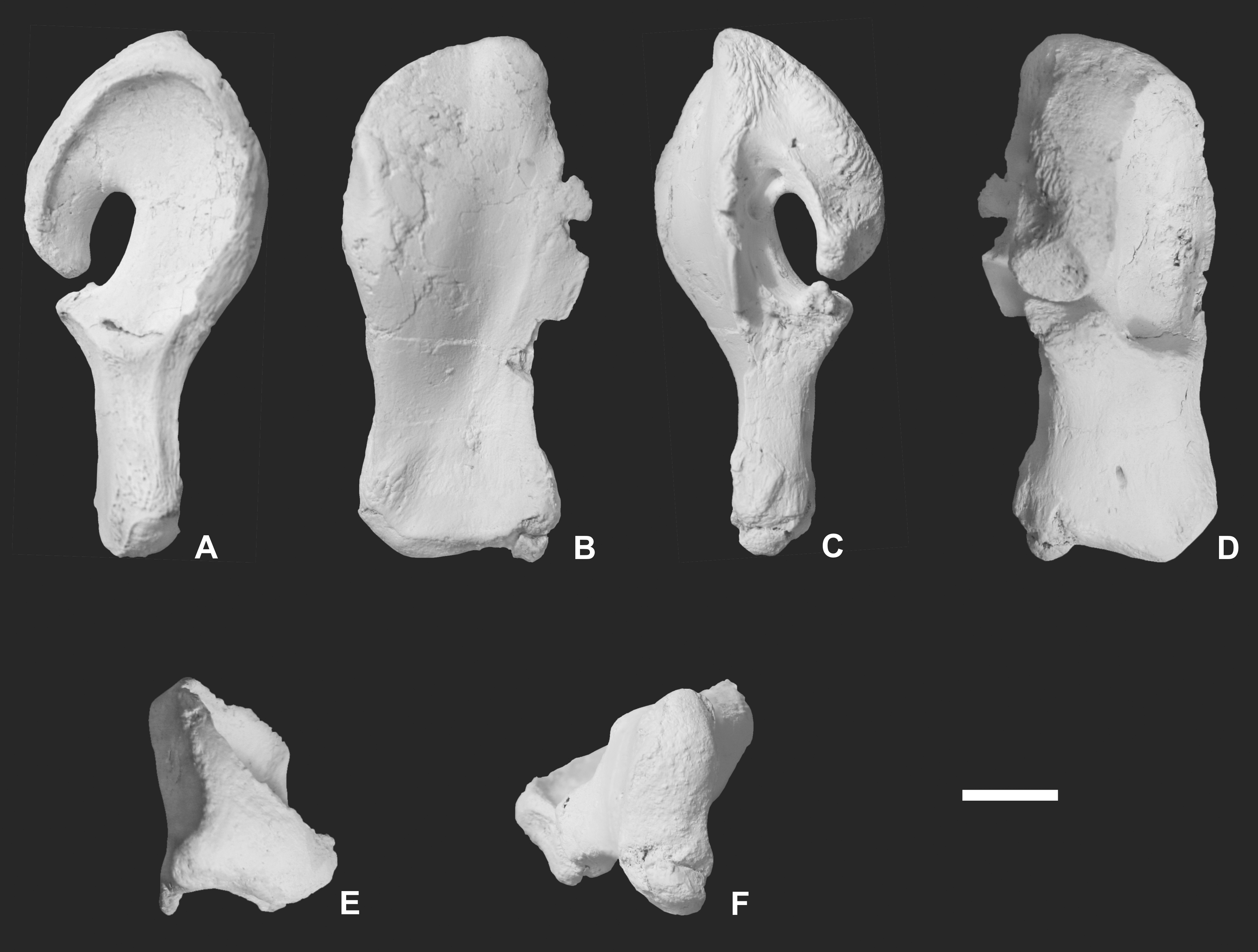
Holotype quadrate (MTM 2011.43.1) of Pannoniasaurus inexpectatus

Pannoniasaurus was a medium-sized mosasauroid, estimated to grow up to a maximum of 6 m (20 ft) in length. It exhibited a combination of primitive characteristics, such as having no predental rostrum, the premaxilla-maxilla suture ends anterior to or level with the midline of the fourth maxillary tooth, a nearly straight frontoparietal suture, and a shallow quadrate alar concavity. It also had elongated stapedial pit that was at least three times longer than it was wide.

Pannoniasaurus is known from various material, including 2 isolated premaxillae, 3 maxillae, 2 postorbitofrontals, 2 quadrates, 3 dentaries, 3 splenials, 3 angulars, a coronoid, 2 surangulars, an articular, 91 isolated teeth, 20 cervical, 40 dorsal, 4 sacral, and 18 caudal vertebrae, 34 vertebral fragments, 3 ribs, 2 humeral fragments, and 4 ilia. Since all remains are isolated bones, the basis for the referral of this material to Pannoniasaurus is based on similar methods used by other authors, such as Houssaye et al. in their study of Pachyvaranus crassispondylus in 2011. The paratypes are known by MTM V.01.115, a left quadrate, and MTM 2007.31.1, a fragmentary left quadrate. Though all remains (including the holotype) of Pannoniasaurus are isolated bones, the density of the specimens, the various size classes, the large number of similar elements from individual animals, and their unique characters make it possible to link them together into a single taxon.

The preserved part of the maxilla bears 12 tooth sockets but the original maxillary tooth count might have been much higher. A number of isolated teeth were attributed to Pannoniasaurus that are similar to Halisaurus, being conical and curved posterolingually, bear crowns with fine anastomosing longitudinal striae, and have a strong mesial but weaker labiodistal carina.

A single vertebra of Pannoniasaurus (MTM V.2000.21), as well as a variety of fish and crocodile teeth, were collected from the waste dump of the subterranean Ajka coal mine. The Ajka Coal Formation interdigitates with the Csehbánya Formation, the depositional environment of the latter was a floodplain, while the Ajka Coal Formation was formed in the accumulation basin of the same river system. Both of these facies were formed in the same paleogeographic area, which itself might have been part of a larger, but isolated landmass.

== Classification ==
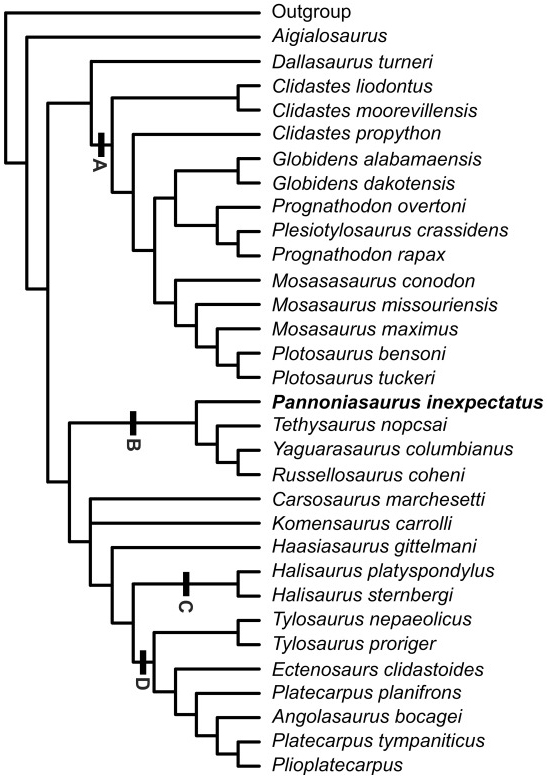
Phylogenetic tree of Pannoniasaurus inexpectatus

Analysis by Makádi et al. found three equally most parsimonious trees that placed Pannoniasaurus in a new clade, the Tethysaurinae. The three trees reconstructed Pannoniasaurus as the sister taxon to the clade that includes Tethysaurus nopcsai, Yaguarasaurus columbianus, and Russellosaurus coheni. Tethysaurinae was reconstructed at the base of a clade that includes the aigialosaurs Carsosaurus, Komensaurus, and Haasiasaurus, and the clades that include conventional marine mosasaur-grade mosasauroids such as halisaurs, tylosaurs and plioplatecarpines. The concept of a monophyletic clade of aigialosaurs from within which a polyphyletic Mosasauridae arises (two major lineages of a grade of paddle-bearing marine mosasaurs), is supported, and provides further support for the hypothesis of convergent aquatic adaptations in paddle-bearing mosasaurs.

The discovery of Pannoniasaurus indicates that, similar to some lineages of cetaceans, mosasauroids quickly radiated into a variety of aquatic environments, with some groups reinvading available niches in freshwater habitats, and becoming highly specialized within those ecosystems.

== Paleobiology ==
Geochemical and isotopic data are most compatible with Pannoniasaurus having lived in a predominantly freshwater ecosystem, and evidence suggests strongly that Pannoniasaurus was not a seasonal migrant from marine waters into fresh, but rather that ecologically it was a permanent member of a freshwater fauna. With the discovery and description of Pannoniasaurus, mosasauroid evolution is now understood as also having involved important and unsuspected adaptations to freshwater ecosystems. The size of Pannoniasaurus makes it the largest known predator in the waters of this paleoenvironment. Additionally, the crocodile-like flattened skull (as indicated by the premaxilla and maxilla) was a useful adaptation for water-level ambush hunting of terrestrial and shallow water prey.

=== Limbs ===
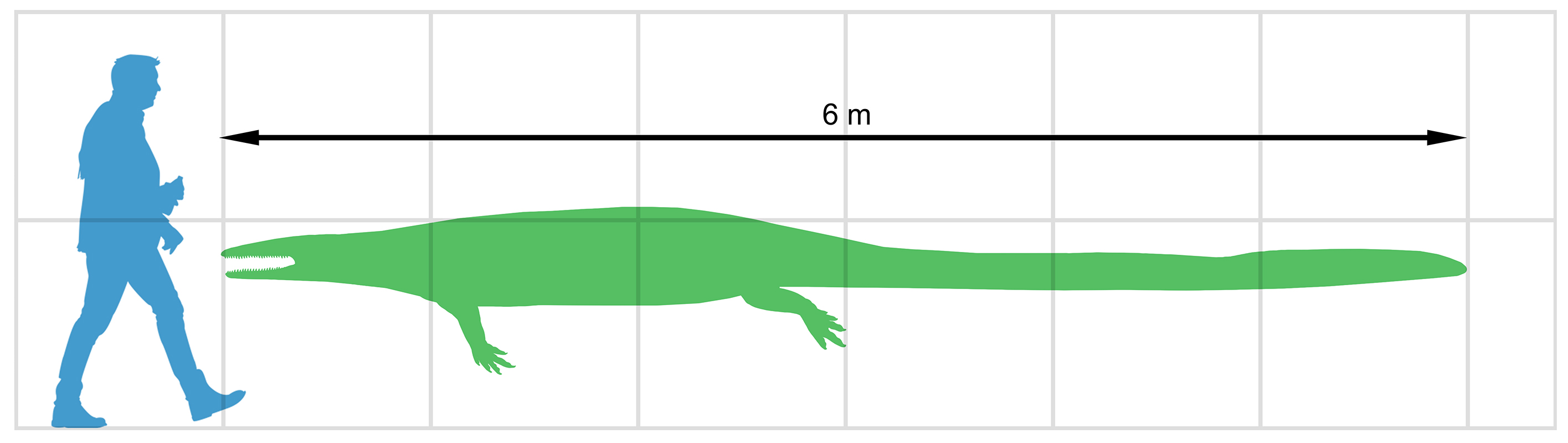
Size of Pannoniasaurus inexpectatus compared to human

It is difficult to estimate how the unknown girdle and limb elements of Pannonisasaurus may have looked. It had a primitive vertebral column, a posteriorly oriented ilium and an elongated humerus with a distal epiphysis, all most similar to aigialosaurs. These suggest that P. inexpectatus had an overall aigialosaur-like postcranial morphology (including plesiopelvia and plesiopedia). However, Dallasaurus, for example, has an anteriorly oriented, hydropelvic ilium in combination with primitive-looking proximal limb elements, and therefore a flattened, derived distal limb morphology is not entirely impossible for that taxon. For Pannoniasaurus a primitive morphology of the complete limbs in correlation with the primitive axial skeleton and pelvis is more probable, but far from certain. It is possible that the retention of a robust sacrum, pelvis and possibly non-paddle-like limbs were used to help to propel the body forward from the bottom during prey-capture in shallow water, similar to extant crocodiles.
