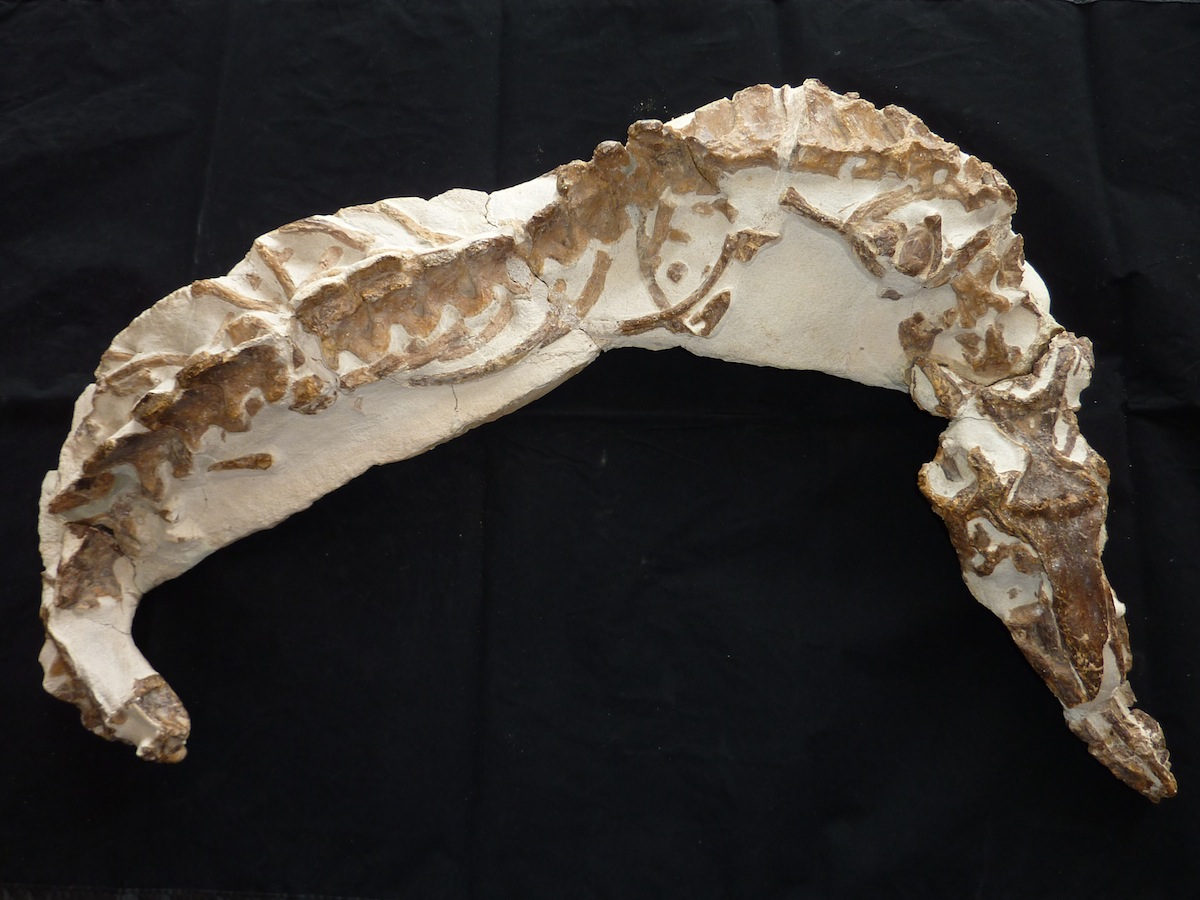
- Skeleton of Tethysaurus

Scientific classification
- Kingdom: Animalia
- Phylum: Chordata
- Class: Reptilia
- Order: Squamata
- Clade: †Mosasauria
- Family: †Mosasauridae
- Clade: †Russellosaurina
- Subfamily: †Tethysaurinae; Makádi et al., 2012

Genera
- †Garamaudo; †Pannoniasaurus; †Tethysaurus

= Tethysaurinae =

Tethysaurinae Temporal range: Late Cretaceous 92–84.9 Ma

Extinct subfamily of mosasaurs

The Tethysaurinae are a subfamily of mosasaurs, a diverse group of Late Cretaceous marine squamates. Members of the subfamily are informally and collectively known as "tethysaurines" and have been recovered from North America and Africa. Only three tethysaurine genera are known, Garamaudo, Pannoniasaurus and Tethysaurus. The genera Yaguarasaurus and Russellosaurus were previously considered tethysaurines until they were grouped with Romeosaurus in the new subfamily Yaguarasaurinae. A possible member of this clade (subfamily) is a mosasaur specimen known from a maxilla fragment, found in 1960 in the Czech Republic (then Czechoslovakia), in Dolní Újezd near Litomyšl.

Like the closely related yaguarasaurines, all tethysaurines were plesiopedal (meaning primitive and not as well adapted to marine life as later mosasaurs). They generally retained relatively small sizes compared to later giant mosasaurs. The tethysaurines appeared during the Turonian and went extinct in the Santonian, possibly outcompeted by more derived mosasaurs. The etymology of this group derives from the genus Tethysaurus (Tethys from the Greek goddess of the sea and sauros, Greek for "lizard").

== Description ==
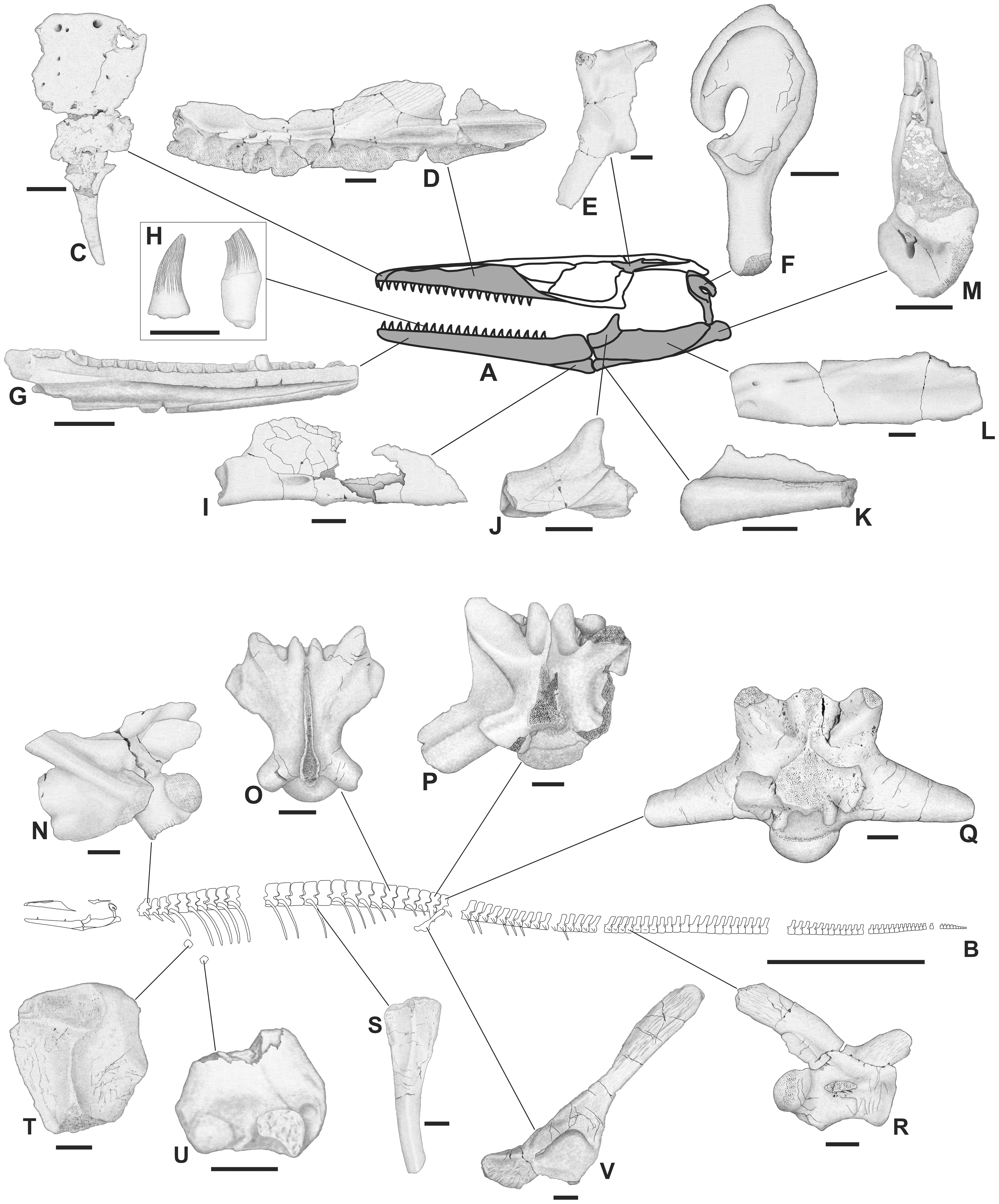
The known skeletal remains and a skeletal restoration of Pannoniasaurus.

Tethysaurines were primitive and comparatively small to medium-sized mosasaurs that lived during the earlier stages of mosasaur evolutionary history. Tethysaurus itself is approximately three metres long, while Pannoniasaurus might have reached lengths of six metres. They had a plesiopedal limb condition, meaning that they were not as well adapted to marine life as later mosasaurs and probably kept to shallow bodies of water. Pannoniasaurus is the only known mosasaur recovered from freshwater deposits.

Makádi et al. (2012) originally diagnosed the Tethysaurinae as all mosasaurs descended from the recentmost common ancestor of Tethysaurus nopscai and Russellosaurus coheni. By this definition, the Yaguarasaurinae would be sunk into this subfamily since Russellosaurus is now considered a yaguarasaurine. Unambiguous character states were listed as follows: "predental rostrum absent; premaxilla-maxilla suture ends anterior to or level with the midline of the fourth maxillary tooth; nearly straight frontoparietal suture; quadrate alar concavity shallow; elongated stapedial pit (at least three times longer than wide); quadrate distal condyle saddle-shaped, upward deflection of quadrate distal condyle absent; mandibular glenoid formed mainly by articular; cervical synapophyses extend below ventral border of centrum; dorsoventrally compressed centra in precaudal vertebrae; two sacrals with large ribs/transverse processes subcircular/oval in cross-section; facet for ilium on tip of sacral transverse processes; very elongated (two times longer than wide) pontosaur-like caudal centra; anteroposteriorly narrow scapula; ilium with posterior iliac process with compressed dorsal end bearing longitudinal grooves and ridges, and spoon-shaped preacetabular process overlapping the pubis".

== Phylogeny ==
The subfamily name is derived from Tethysaurus due to Tethysaurus being the best-represented genus of the subfamily and being known from multiple partial skeletons.

The original definition of the Tethysaurinae was as all mosasaurs descended from the most recent common ancestor of Tethysaurus nopscai and Russellosaurus coheni. The cladogram below follows Makádi et al. (2012) and the then assumed internal relationships of the Tethysaurinae.

- Tethysaurinae
  - Pannoniasaurus inexpectatus
  - - Tethysaurus nopscai
    - - Yaguarasaurus columbianus
      - Russellosaurus coheni

Yaguarasaurus and Russellosaurus are today considered part of the Yaguarasaurinae instead, which is defined as the most recent common ancestor of Russellosaurus, Romeosaurus, and Yaguarasaurus, and all of its descendants.
