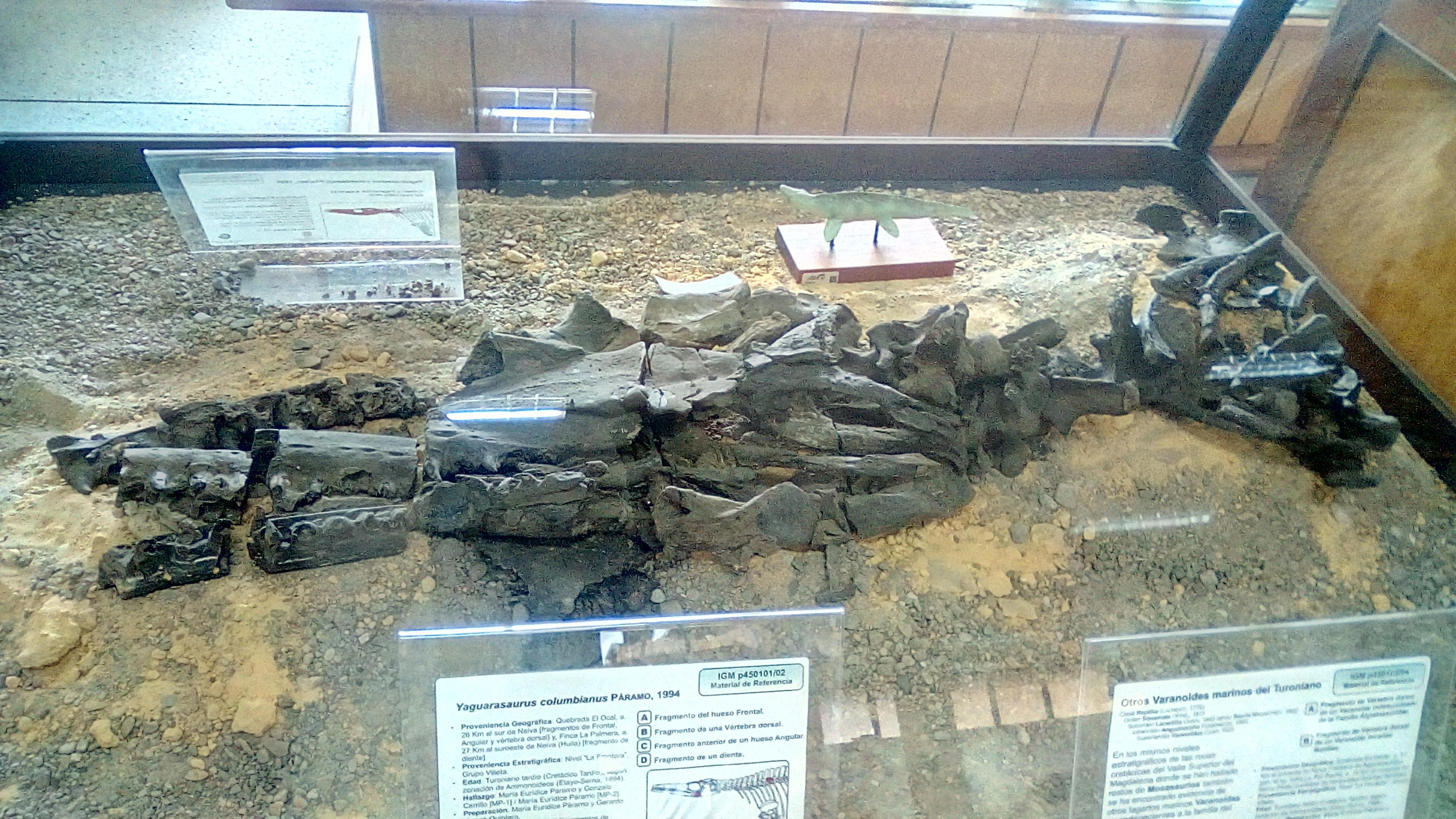
- Skull and first cervical vertebrae of Y. columbianus. Geological Museum José Royo y Gómez, Bogotá

Scientific classification
- Kingdom: Animalia
- Phylum: Chordata
- Class: Reptilia
- Order: Squamata
- Clade: †Mosasauria
- Family: †Mosasauridae
- Clade: †Russellosaurina
- Subfamily: †Yaguarasaurinae
- Genus: †Yaguarasaurus; Páramo 1994

Type species
- †Yaguarasaurus columbianus Páramo 1994

Other species
- †Y. regiomontanus Rivera-Sylva et al., 2023

= Yaguarasaurus =

Yaguarasaurus Temporal range: Turonian, 90 Ma

Extinct genus of lizards

Yaguarasaurus is an extinct genus of mosasauroid from the Late Cretaceous (Turonian) period of Colombia, South America. The remains discovered (an articulated skull, some vertebrae and ribs) were defined as a new genus and species of mosasaurid, Yaguarasaurus columbianus, by the Colombian paleontologist María Páramo, former director of the Museo de Geología José Royo y Gómez of INGEOMINAS in Bogotá. The first fossils remains of this animal suggested a cranial length of 47 centimetres (19 in) and a total length of 5 metres (16 ft); an additional skull that measures 87 centimetres (34 in) long implies a larger size.

This reptile is a member of the family of marine lizards Mosasauridae characteristic of Middle and Upper Cretaceous, with global distribution, but in South America known only through isolated remains (Price, 1957, Pierce and Welles, 1959; Bonaparte, 1978; Ameghino, 1918). This mosasaur discovered in Yaguará, was at the moment of discovery the most complete material known in South America.

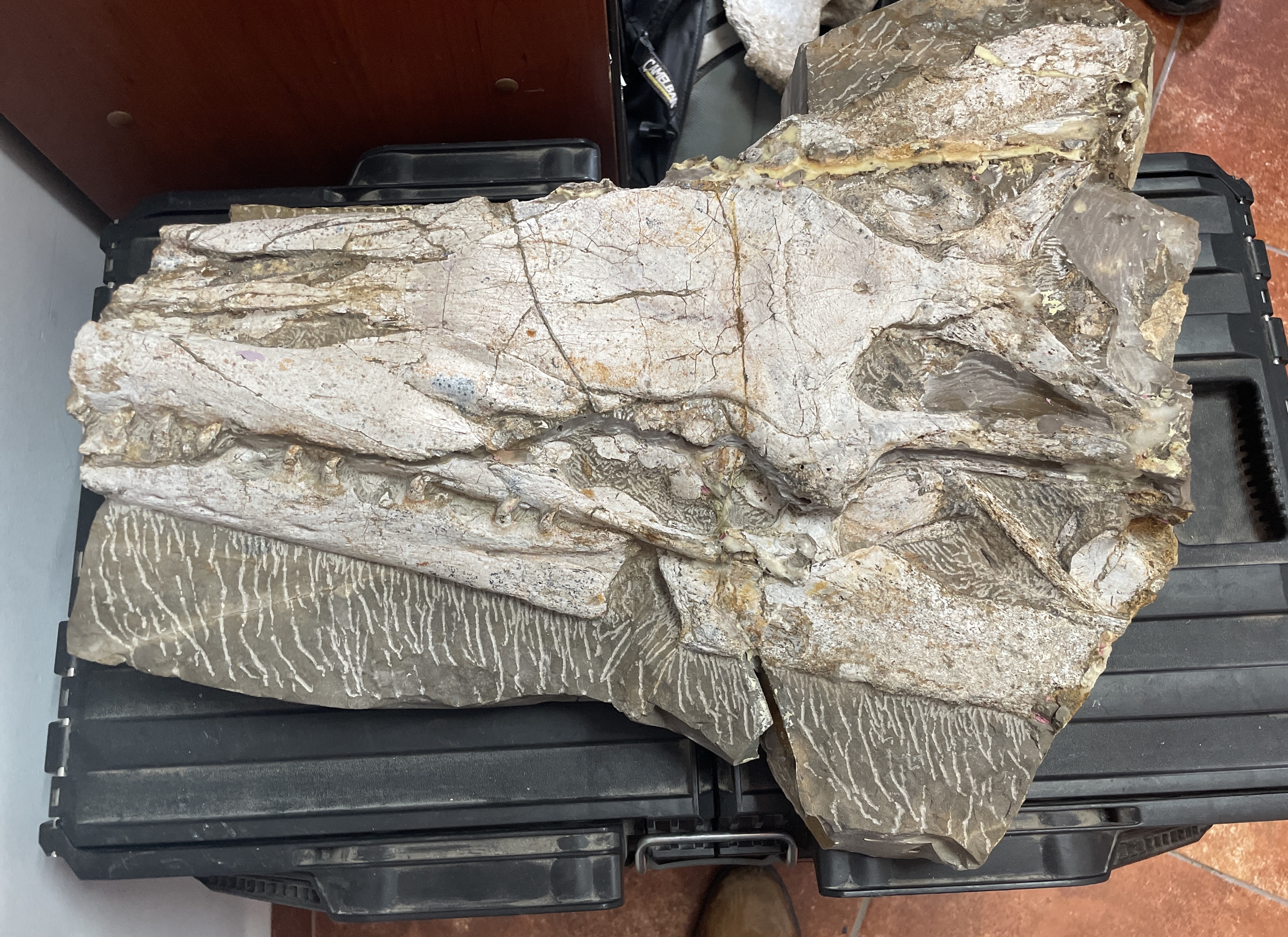
Holotype skull of Y. regiomontanus at the Museo del Desierto, Saltillo, Coahuila

== Etymology ==
The remains were found in a limestone bed (Upper Turonian) of the La Frontera Formation, member of the Villeta Group, near Yaguará, Huila, in a site called Cueva Rica. Its name means "Yaguará lizard of Colombia".

== Phylogeny ==
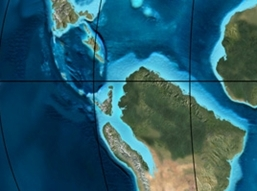
Paleogeography of Northern South America, 90 Ma by Ron Blakey

The following cladograms illustrate the phylogenetic analyses of two competing hypotheses on the classification of Yaguarasaurus. Topology A represents the traditional view of the genus belonging to the subfamily Yaguarasaurinae following Palci et al. (2013). Topology B follows Rivera-Sylva et al. (2023) and depicts a new hypothesis holding Yaguarasaurus as a basal member of the Plioplatecarpinae, which was first proposed by Polcyn et al. (2023) based on the discovery of synapomorphies in the braincase.

In the second scenario, the two species of Yaguarasaurus are paraphyletic with respect to more derived plioplatecarpines, with Y. regiomontanus lying further up the tree.

Topology A
Yaguarasaurine per Palci et al. (2013)

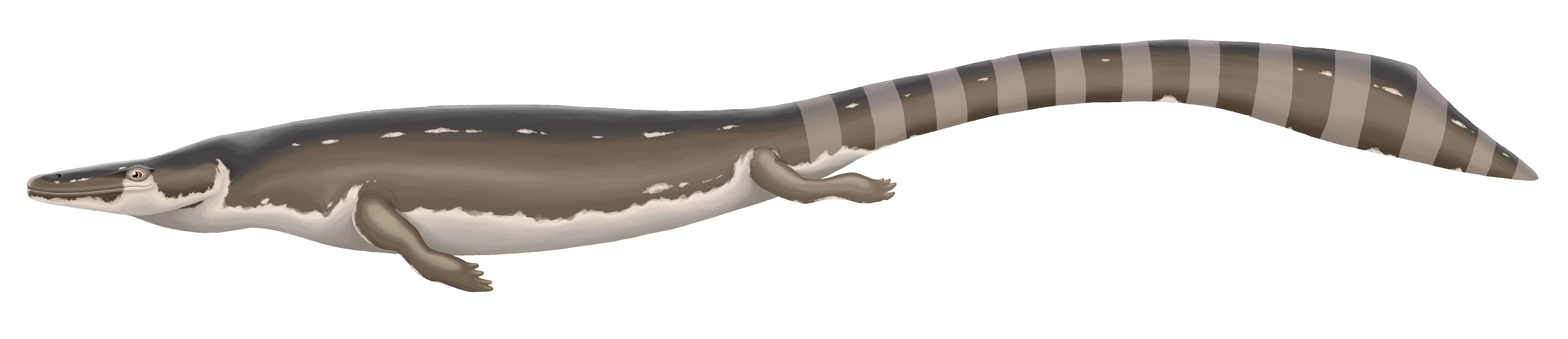

- Russellosaurina
  - - Tethysaurinae
      - Tethysaurus nopscai
      - Pannoniasaurus inexpectatus
    - Yaguarasaurinae
      - Yaguarasaurus columbianus
      - - Russellosaurus coheni
        - Romeosaurus fumanensis
  - - Plioplatecarpinae
      - - Angolasaurus bocagei
        - - Selmasaurus johnsoni
          - Ectenosaurus clidastoides
      - - Plesioplatecarpus planiforms
        - - Latoplatecarpus willistoni
          - - Platecarpus tympanticus
            - Plioplatecarpus spp.
    - Tylosaurinae

Topology B
Basal plioplatecarpine per Rivera-Sylva et al. (2023)

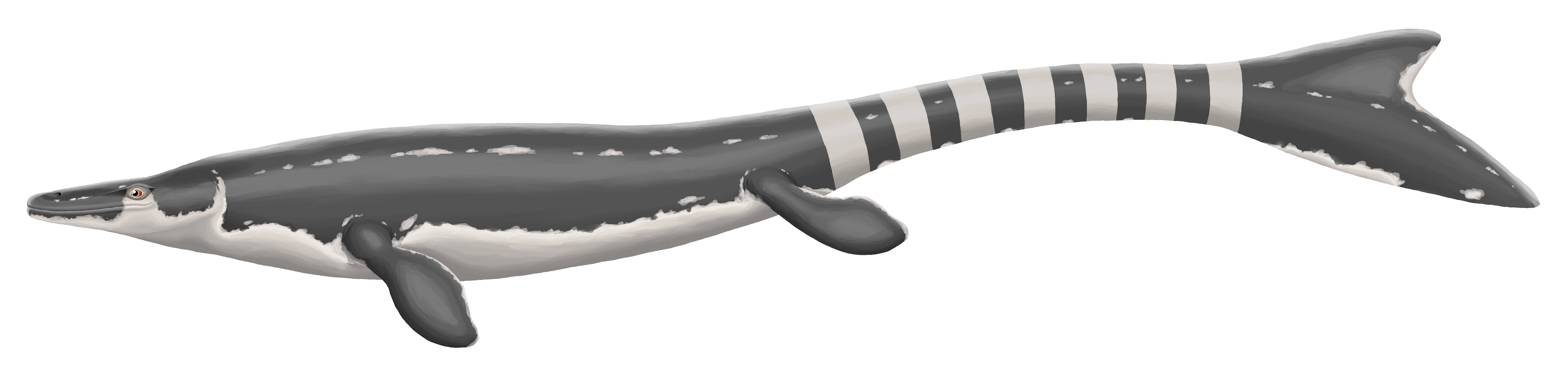

- Plioplatecarpinae
  - Tethysaurus nopscai
  - - Russellosaurus coheni
    - - Yaguarasaurus columbianus
      - - KUVP 97200
        - - Yaguarasaurus regiomontanus
          - - - Ectenosaurus everhartorum
              - Ectenosaurus clidastoides
            - - Angolasaurus bocagei
              - - - Plesioplatecarpus planiforms
                  - - Platecarpus tympanticus
                    - - Latoplatecarpus willistoni
                      - - Plioplatecarpus nichollsae
                        - - Plioplatecarpus brachycephalus
                          - - Plioplatecarpus coryphaeus
                            - Plioplatecarpus primaevus
                            - - Plioplatecarpus peckensis
                              - Plioplatecarpus houzeaui
                              - Plioplatecarpus marshi
                - - Selmasaurus johnsoni
                  - - Selmasaurus russelli
                    - - Gavialimimus almaghribensis
                      - Goronyosaurus nigeriensis

== See also ==
- List of mosasaurs
