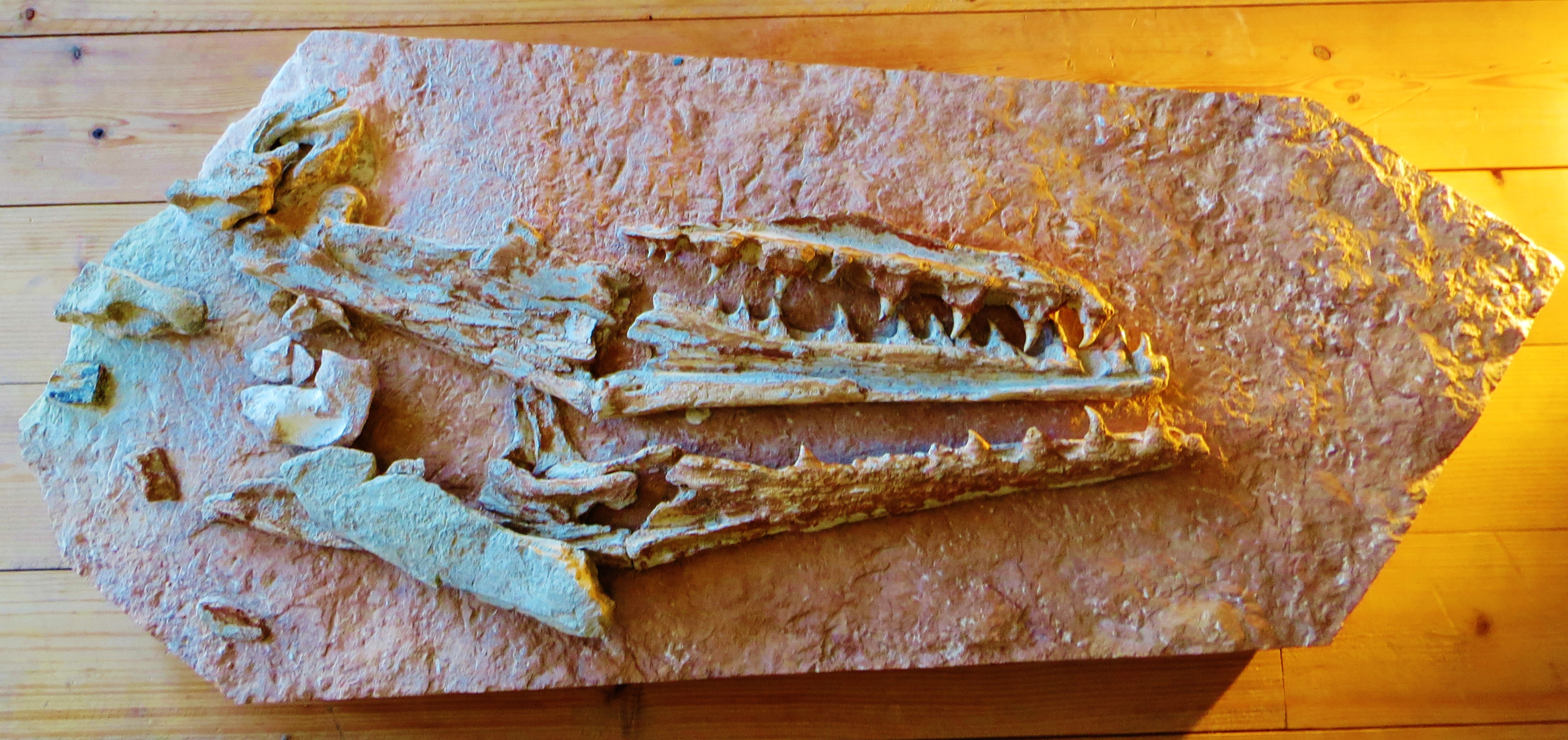
- Skull of Romeosaurus fumanensis.

Scientific classification
- Kingdom: Animalia
- Phylum: Chordata
- Class: Reptilia
- Order: Squamata
- Clade: †Mosasauria
- Family: †Mosasauridae
- Clade: †Russellosaurina
- Subfamily: †Yaguarasaurinae; Palci et al., 2013

Genera
- †Romeosaurus; †Russellosaurus; †Yaguarasaurus

= Yaguarasaurinae =

Yaguarasaurinae Temporal range: Late Cretaceous 89.3–85.8 Ma

Extinct subfamily of lizards

The Yaguarasaurinae are a subfamily of mosasaurs, a diverse group of Late Cretaceous marine squamates. Members of the subfamily are informally and collectively known as "yaguarasaurines" and have been recovered from North and South America and Europe. Three genera, Yaguarasaurus, Russellosaurus and Romeosaurus are known. Yaguarasaurus and Russellosaurus were previously considered part of the Tethysaurinae until they were grouped with Romeosaurus as yaguarasaurines.

Like the closely related tethysaurines, all yaguarasaurines were plesiopedal (meaning primitive and not as well adapted to marine life as later mosasaurs). They generally retained relatively small sizes compared to later giant mosasaurs, though Yaguarasaurus itself might have grown rather large. The yaguarasaurines appeared during the Turonian and might have survived into the Santonian, though they were extinct by the Campanian when more derived and hydropedal mosasaurs had appeared. The etymology of this group derives from the genus Yaguarasaurus (after the town Yaguará and sauros, Greek for "lizard").

== Description ==
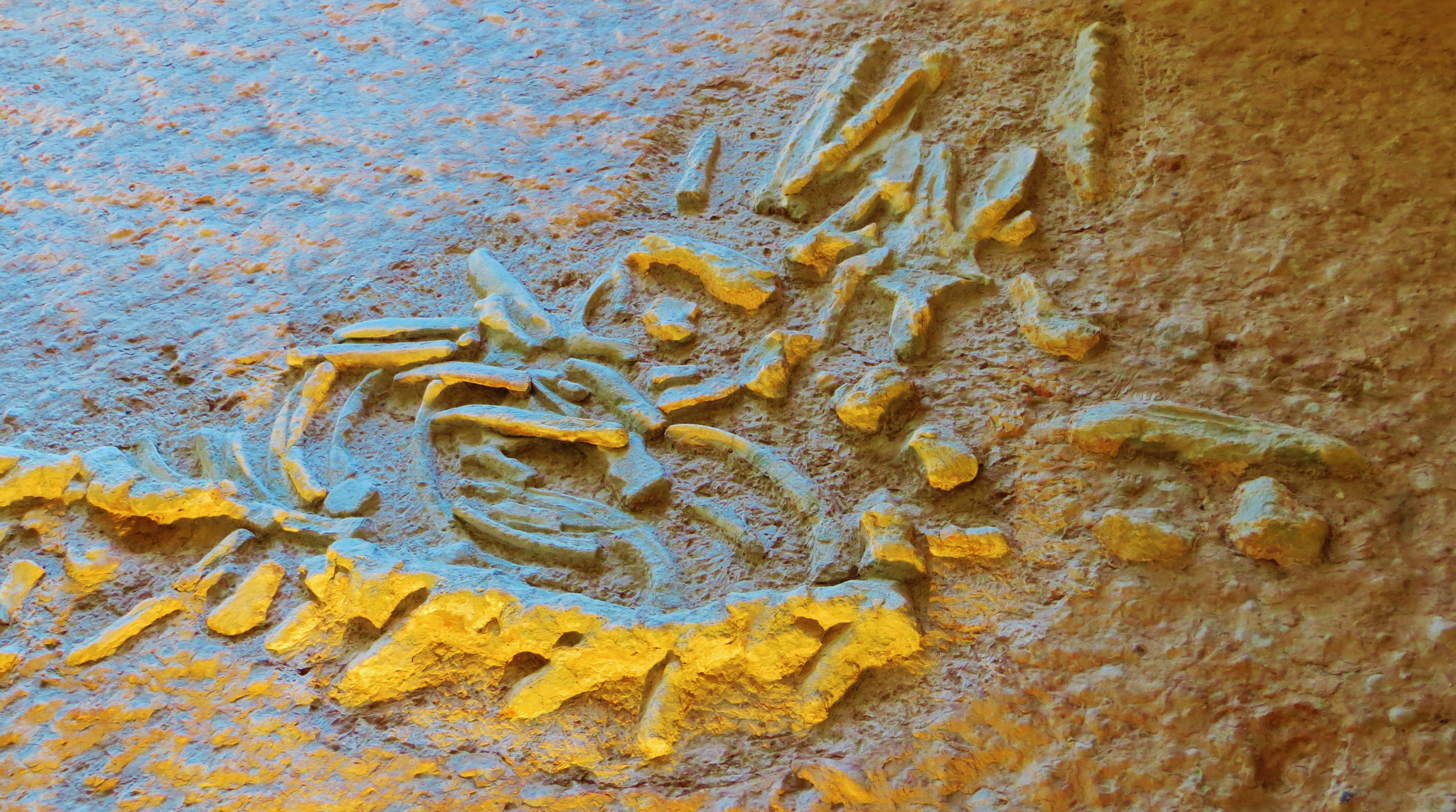
Skeleton of Romeosaurus.

Yaguarasaurines were primitive and comparatively small to medium-sized mosasaurs that lived during the earlier stages of mosasaur evolutionary history. Yaguarasaurus columbianus itself is the largest species of the subfamily, with the largest known skeleton at a length of 5 metres and a massive isolated skull indicating larger sizes. This proves that primitive mosasaurs were not necessarily all small. They had a plesiopedal limb condition, meaning that they were not as well adapted to marine life as later mosasaurs and probably kept to shallow bodies of water.

Palci et al. (2013) defined the Yaguarasaurinae as the most recent common ancestor of Russellosaurus, Romeosaurus, and Yaguarasaurus, and all of its descendants. Unambiguous character states were listed as follows: "frontals not invaded by posterior end of nares (i.e., lack of distinct narial emargination on frontals); jugal rami form a 90◦ angle and produce a distinct posteroventral process at their junction; quadrate ala forms a shallow concavity; medial parapet of dentary (dentary medial shelf) low, tooth roots largely exposed in medial view; dentary has a projection anterior to the first tooth (reversed in Russellosaurus)".

== Phylogeny ==
Yaguarasaurinae was created with the description of Romeosaurus, prior to its description the other genera in the subfamily were considered members of the Tethysaurinae. The cladogram below follows Palci et al. (2012) and showcases the internal relationships of the Yaguarasaurinae and the close relation to the Tethysaurinae.

- Russellosaurina
  - Tethysaurinae
  - - Yaguarasaurus columbianus
    - - Russellosaurus coheni
      - - Romeosaurus fumenensis
        - Romeosaurus sorbinii

== Taxonomy and species ==
Yaguarasaurinae

- Yaguarasaurus
  - Y. columbianus
  - Y. regiomontanus
- Russellosaurus
  - R. coheni
- Romeosaurus
  - R. fumanensis
  - R. sorbinii
