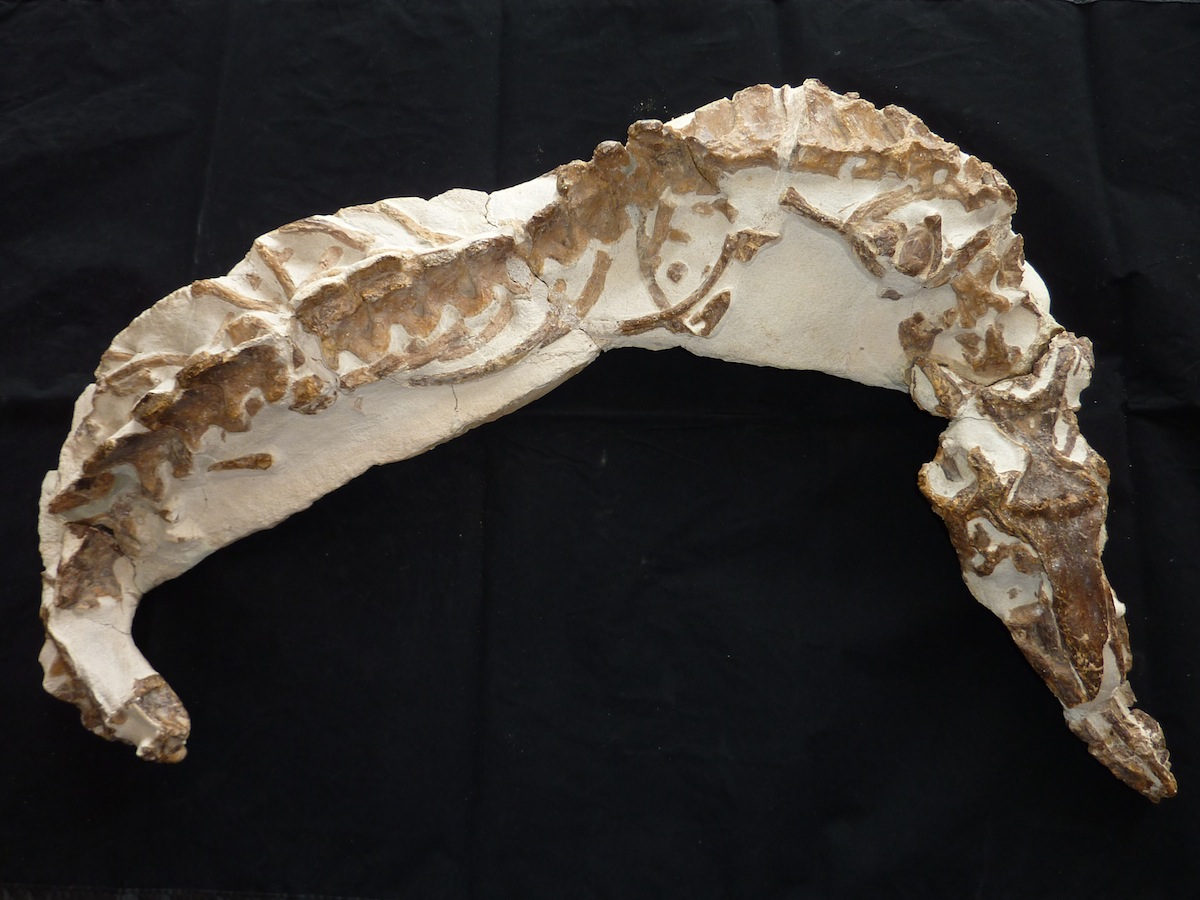
- Tethysaurus skeleton

Scientific classification
- Kingdom: Animalia
- Phylum: Chordata
- Class: Reptilia
- Order: Squamata
- Clade: †Mosasauria
- Family: †Mosasauridae
- Clade: †Russellosaurina
- Subfamily: †Tethysaurinae
- Genus: †Tethysaurus; Bardet, Pereda-Suberbiola & Jalil, 2003

Type species
- †Tethysaurus nopcsai Bardet, Pereda-Suberbiola & Jalil, 2003

= Tethysaurus =

Tethysaurus Temporal range: Late Cretaceous, 93–89 Ma

Extinct genus of lizards

Tethysaurus is an extinct genus of tethysaurine mosasauroid from the Early Turonian (Late Cretaceous) period. The only species is Tethysaurus nopcsai.

== Discovery ==
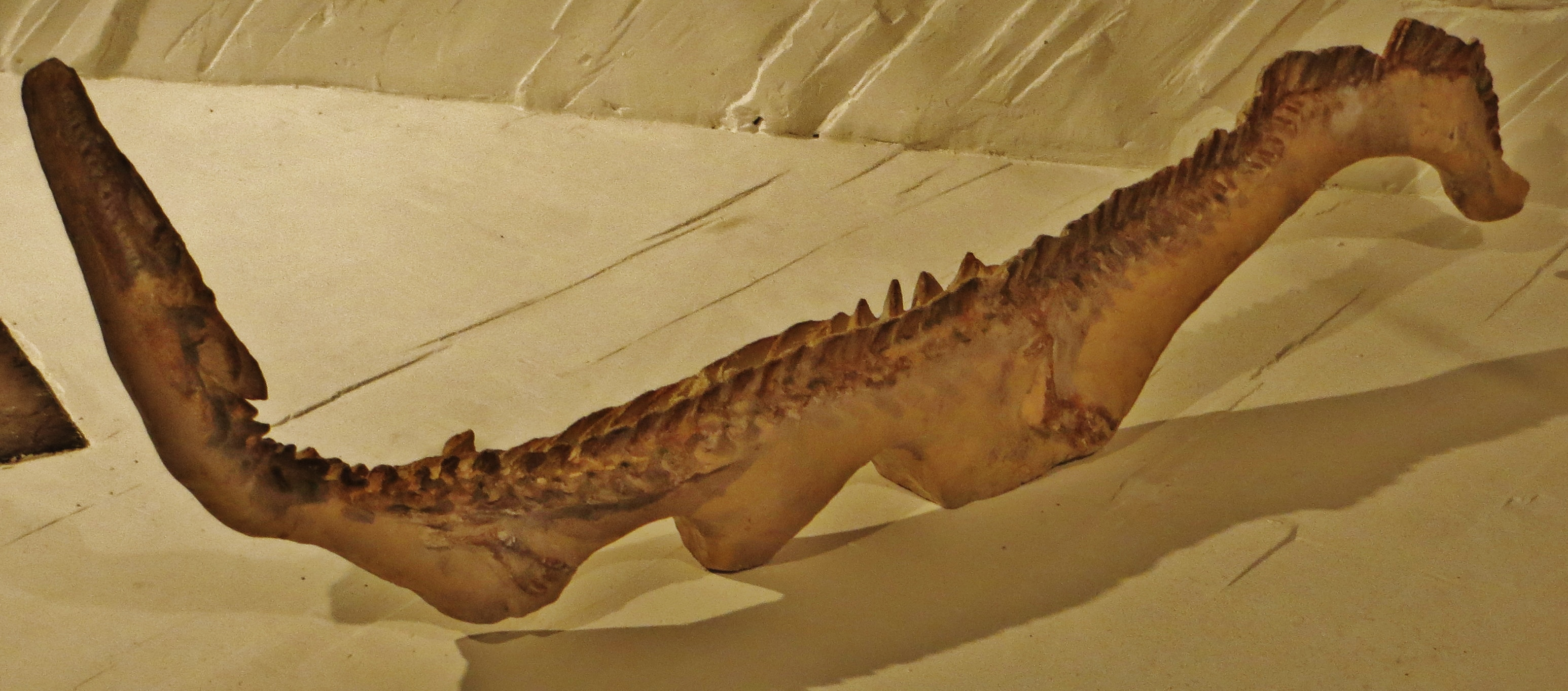
Fossil

The name means "Tethys' lizard of Nopcsa", a reference to the Greek goddess of the sea Tethys (also the name of the Tethys Ocean, an ancient sea between southern Europe and northern Africa) and to the Hungarian paleontologist Baron Ferenc Nopcsa, who made pioneering studies on Adriatic aquatic squamates. It was found in the Akrabou Formation, near the villages of Tadirhourst and Asfla in the region of Goulmima, Errachidia Province, in Morocco, with three referred specimens that included a nearly complete articulated skull, mandible, vertebrae and portions of the appendicular skeleton. The diagnosis after Bardet et al. is "(...) prefrontal strongly vaulted in anterior view; parietal exhibits a triangular table ending posteriorly in two pointed pegs overlying the supraoccipital; jugal with a large and wide ascending ramus; the floor of the foramen magnum pierced by three foramina; splenial with a large notched dorsomedial process; surangular exposed medially ventral to the coronoid; dental formula: 19-20 maxillary, 15-19 pterygoid and at least 19 dentary teeth; large paracotylar and parazygosphenal foramina on vertebrae."

== Description ==
A mosasaur measuring under 3 m (9.8 ft) long, Tethysaurus displays a number of basal and derived features that led to an initial classification as an intermediate stage between primitive aigialosaurids of the Cenomanian and derived mosasaurids from the Turonian to the Maastrichtian. More recent analysis put Tethysaurus in a clade along Russellosaurus and Yaguarasaurus called the parafamily Russellosaurina, as a basal Turonian clade of Mosasauridae.

== Phylogeny ==
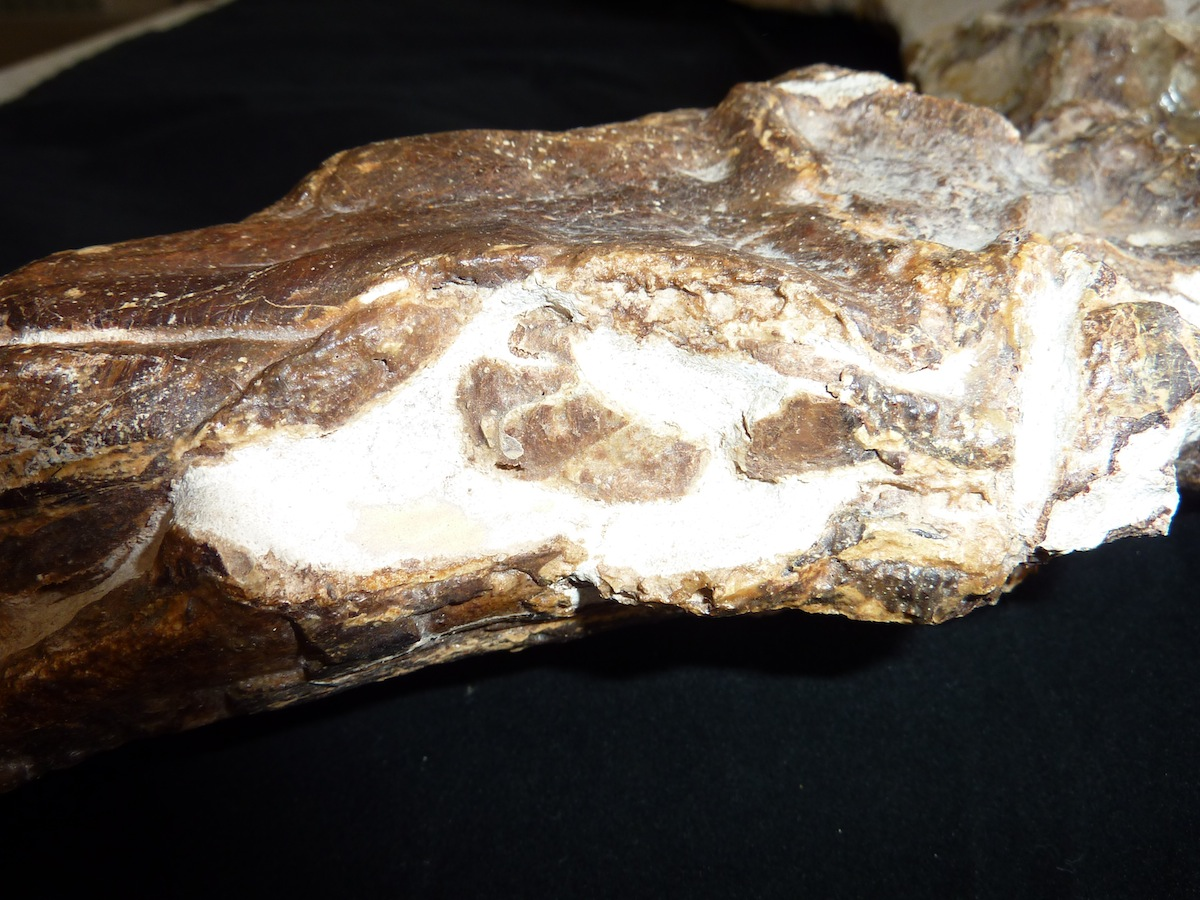
Tethysaurus sclerotic eye ring

Cladogram based in the analysis by Makádi et al. in 2012:

- Tethysaurinae
  - Pannoniasaurus inexpectatus
  - - Tethysaurus nopcsai
    - - Yaguarasaurus columbianus
      - Russellosaurus coheni

== See also ==
- List of mosasaurs
