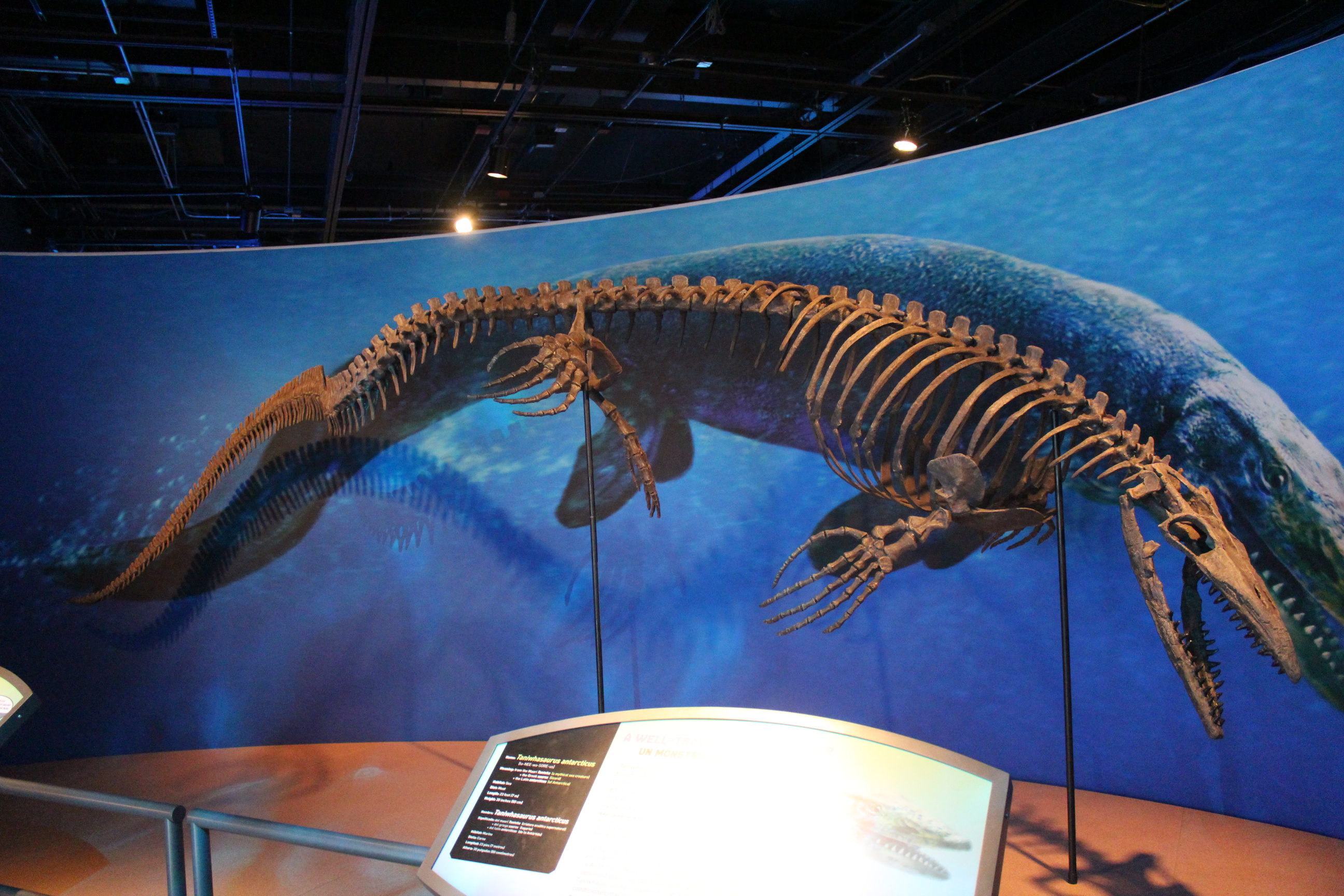
- Reconstructed skeleton of T. antarcticus, Field Museum

Scientific classification
- Kingdom: Animalia
- Phylum: Chordata
- Class: Reptilia
- Order: Squamata
- Clade: †Mosasauria
- Family: †Mosasauridae
- Clade: †Russellosaurina
- Subfamily: †Tylosaurinae
- Genus: †Taniwhasaurus; Hector, 1874

Type species
- †Taniwhasaurus oweni Hector, 1874

Other species
- †T. antarcticus (Novas et al., 2002); †T. 'mikasaensis' Caldwell et al., 2008

Synonyms
- List of synonyms: Synonyms of genus; Lakumasaurus Novas et al., 2002; "Yezosaurus" Muramoto & Obata, 1977 Synonyms of T. oweni; Tylosaurus haumuriensis Hector, 1874; Leiodon haumuriensis Hector, 1874; Platecarpus oweni Lydekker, 1888 Synonyms of T. antarcticus; Lakumasaurus antarcticus Novas et al., 2002 Synonyms of T. 'mikasaensis'; "Yezosaurus mikasaensis" Muramoto & Obata, 1977

= Taniwhasaurus =

Taniwhasaurus Temporal range: Late Cretaceous (Campanian), 83.6–72.1 Ma Potential Santonian record in South Africa, Japan and Russia.

Extinct genus of marine squamate reptiles

Taniwhasaurus is an extinct genus of mosasaurs (a group of extinct marine lizards) that lived during the Campanian stage of the Late Cretaceous. It is a member of the subfamily Tylosaurinae, a lineage of mosasaurs characterized by a long toothless conical rostrum. Two valid species are attached to the genus, T. oweni and T. antarcticus, known respectively from the fossil record of present-day New Zealand and Antarctica. T. 'capensis' from present-day South Africa represents a chimera of two different mosasaur genera, potentially Prognathodon and Taniwhasaurus, but not identifiable at the species level. The other formerly assigned species, T. 'mikasaensis' from present-day Japan, remains problematic due to the fragmentary state of the attributed fossils. The generic name literally means "taniwha lizard", referring to a supernatural aquatic creature from Māori mythology.

Taniwhasaurus is a medium-sized mosasaurid, with maximum size estimates putting it at around 6.7 meters (22 ft) in length. The rare fossils of the axial skeleton indicate that the animal would have had great mobility in the vertebral column, but the tail would generate the main propulsive movement, a method of swimming proposed for other mosasaurids. The constitution of the forelimb of Taniwhasaurus indicates that it would have had powerful paddles for swimming. CT scans performed on the snout foramina of T. antarcticus show that Taniwhasaurus, like various aquatic predators today, would likely have had an electro-sensitive organ capable of detecting the movements of prey underwater.

The fossil record shows that both officially recognized species of Taniwhasaurus were endemic to the seas of the ancient supercontinent Gondwana, nevertheless living in different types of bodies of waterbodies. Indeterminate specimens including the holotype of T. 'mikasaensis' have also been found in Eurasia, but they are not diagnostic to the species level. The concerned geological formations shows that the genus shared its habitat with invertebrates, bony fishes, cartilaginous fishes, and other marine reptiles, including plesiosaurs and other mosasaurs.

== Research history ==
=== Recognized species ===
==== T. oweni ====
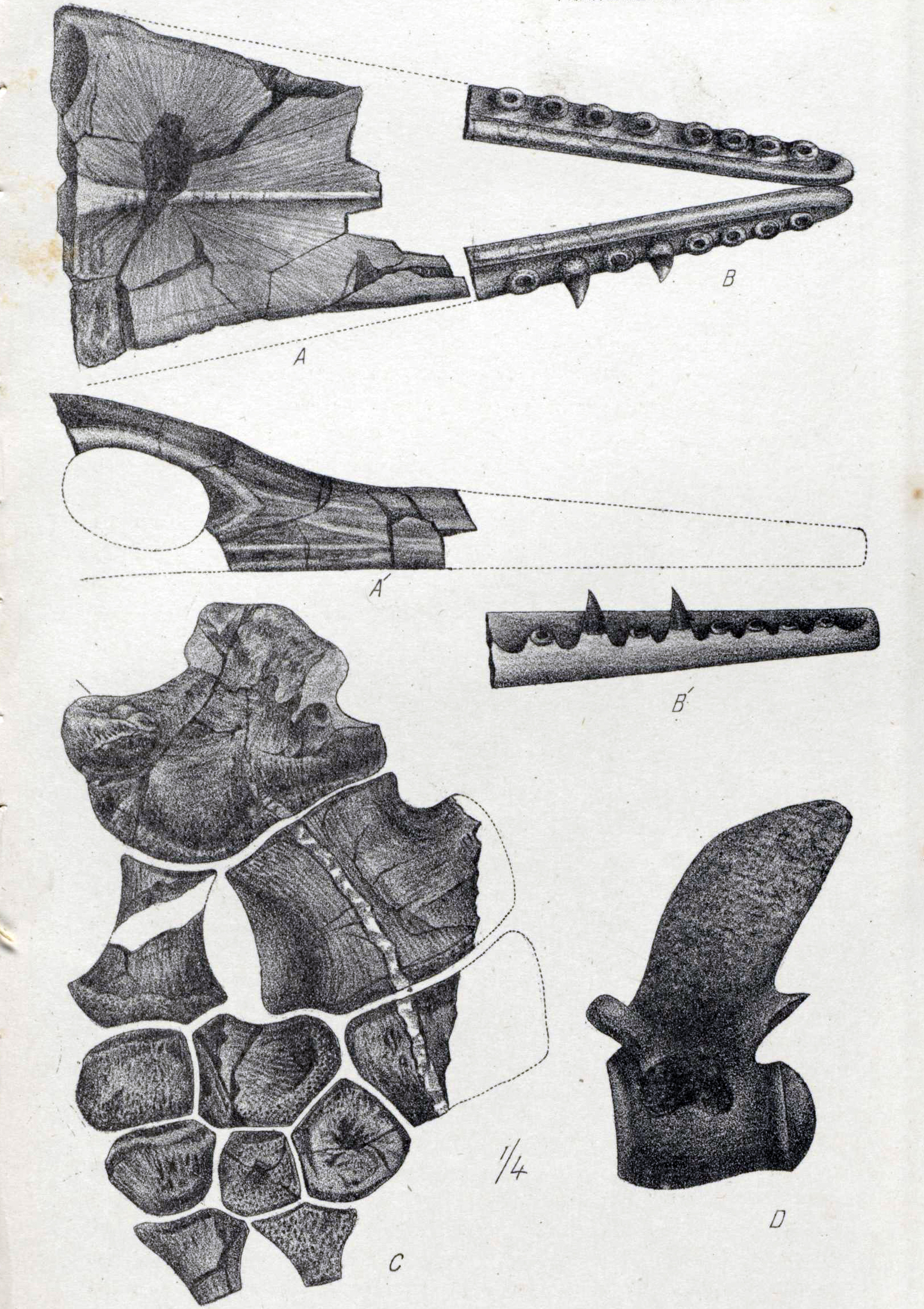
Cranial elements of specimen cataloged NMNZ R1536, the lectotype of T. oweni, with associated vertebra and phalanges

The first known species, Taniwhasaurus oweni, was discovered in the 1860s in the cliffs of Haumuri Bluff, located in the Conway Formation, eastern New Zealand. This formation is dated from the Upper Cretaceous, more precisely from the lower and middle Campanian stage. The first fossils formally attributed to this taxon were described by the Scottish naturalist James Hector in 1874. The skeletal material of T. oweni consisted of a skull, vertebrae and paddles, divided into three distinct sections. In 1888, noting that the fossils are incomplete, Richard Lydekker uncertainly placed T. oweni within the genus Platecarpus, being renamed Platecarpus oweni. In 1897, in his revision of the distribution of mosasaurs, Samuel Wendell Williston put Taniwhasaurus back as a separate genus, but considered it to still be close to Platecarpus. As Hector did not designate a holotype fossil for this taxona, Samuel Paul Welles and D. R. Gregg designate specimen NMNZ R1536, a fragmented skull consisting of frontal and parietal bone accompanied by partial dentary bone, as the lectotype of T. oweni in 1971. The genus name Taniwhasaurus is made up of the Māori word Taniwha, and the Ancient Greek word σαῦρος (saûros, "lizard"), all literally meaning "lizard of Taniwha", in reference to a supernatural aquatic creature from Māori mythology. The specific epithet oweni is named in honor of the famous English paleontologist Richard Owen, who was the first to describe the Mesozoic marine reptiles of New Zealand.

In his article, Hector describes several skeletal remains which he attributes to another mosasaur, which he names Leiodon haumuriensis. In 1897, Williston suggested to transfer this taxon within the genus Tylosaurus, a proposal that was carried out in 1971, being renamed Tylosaurus haumuriensis. Welles and Gregg also referred to specimen NMNZ R1532 as the lectotype of Tylosaurus haumuriensis in the article. Although most of these remains have been lost since the 1890s, it's in 1999 that new cranial and postcranial material was discovered in the cliffs of Haumuri Bluff and that these findings were formalized by Michael W. Caldwell and his colleagues in 2005. Based on extensive analyzes of these fossils, researchers found that there are in fact few morphological differences between the two mosasaur taxa from this locality, the differences being mainly due to the larger size of specimen NMNZ R1532, making Tylosaurus haumuriensis a junior synonym of T. oweni.

==== T. antarcticus ====
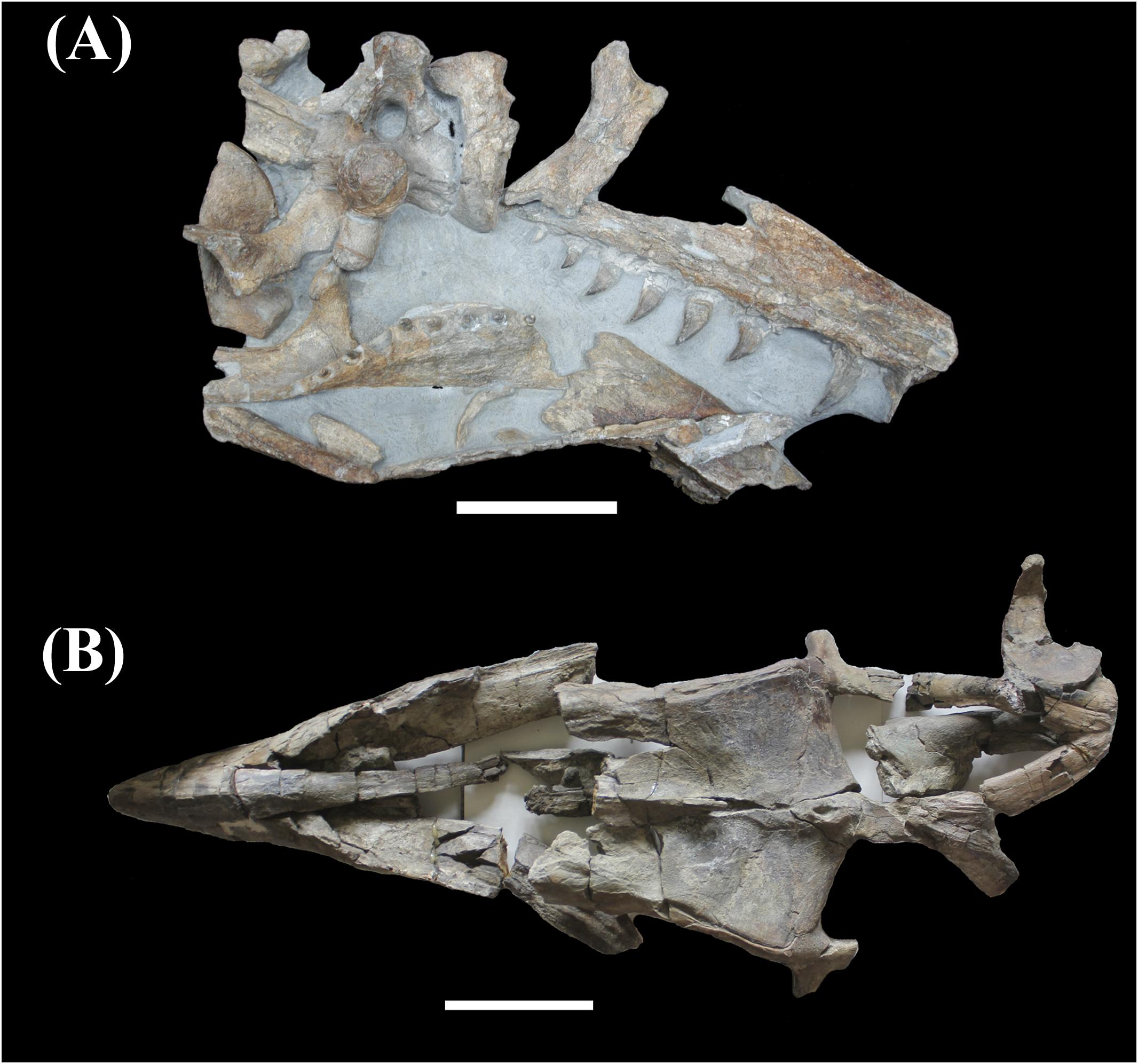
Cranial material from the specimen attributed to T. oweni (A) and from the holotype of T. antarcticus (B)

In January 2000, paleontologist Juan M. Lirio discovered a remarkably well-preserved specimen of a mosasaur in the Gamma Member of the Snow Hill Island Formation, located on James Ross Island in Antarctica. This geological member was originally misidentified as belonging to the neighboring Santa Marta Formation. The Gamma Member of the Snow Hill Island Formation is dated in the late Campanian to late Maastrichtian stages of the Upper Cretaceous. This discovery concerns a tylosaurine specimen which heve been discovered in the Upper Campanian fossil record, cataloged IAA 2000-JR-FSM-1, containing a skull measuring 72 cm (28 in) long, teeth, some vertebrae and rib fragments. Unlike the majority of other Antarctic mosasaurs, which are primarily known from teeth and postcranial remains, the skull of this specimen is almost complete and articulated. After analyzing the material, Fernando E. Novas and his colleagues named it Lakumasaurus antarcticus. The genus name Lakumasaurus comes from the Lakuma, a sea spirit from the mythology of the Yahgan people, and from the Ancient Greek term σαῦρος (saûros, "lizard"), to literally give "lizard of Lakuma". The specific epithet antarcticus refers to Antarctica, where the animal lived.

From 2006, James E. Martin questioned the validity of Lakumasaurus as a separate genus, noting that the cranial features are small enough to justify such a proposal. However, he state that there are enough differences to classify Lakumasaurus antarcticus as the second species in the genus Taniwhasaurus, being renamed T. antarcticus, a proposal that he would confirm the following year with his colleague Marta Fernández. The same year, Martin and his colleagues announced the discovery of a juvenile skull considered to belong to the same species and dating from the Maastrichtian, but subsequent studies are skeptical of this claim. Less than two years later, in 2009, the same authors published an article that described in more detail the fossil material and the phylogenetic relationships between the species T. antarcticus and T. oweni, a relationship that happens to be still recognized today.

=== Formerly assigned species ===
==== T. 'capensis' ====
At the beginning of the 20th century, several fossils began to be collected in the region of Pondoland, in South Africa. These fossils turn out to belong to squamates and sea turtles dating from the Santonian stage of the Upper Cretaceous. In 1901, one of the sets of fossils discovered (catalogued as SAM-PK-5265), being a few fragmentary pieces of a jawbone, was referred as belonging to a reptile considered close to the genus Mosasaurus. This collection of fossils was later given to the Scottish paleontologist Robert Broom, who published in 1912 an article describing the same bones, along with a vertebra attributed to this specimen. He concludes that the fossils would belong to a large South African representative of the genus Tylosaurus, naming it Tylosaurus capensis.

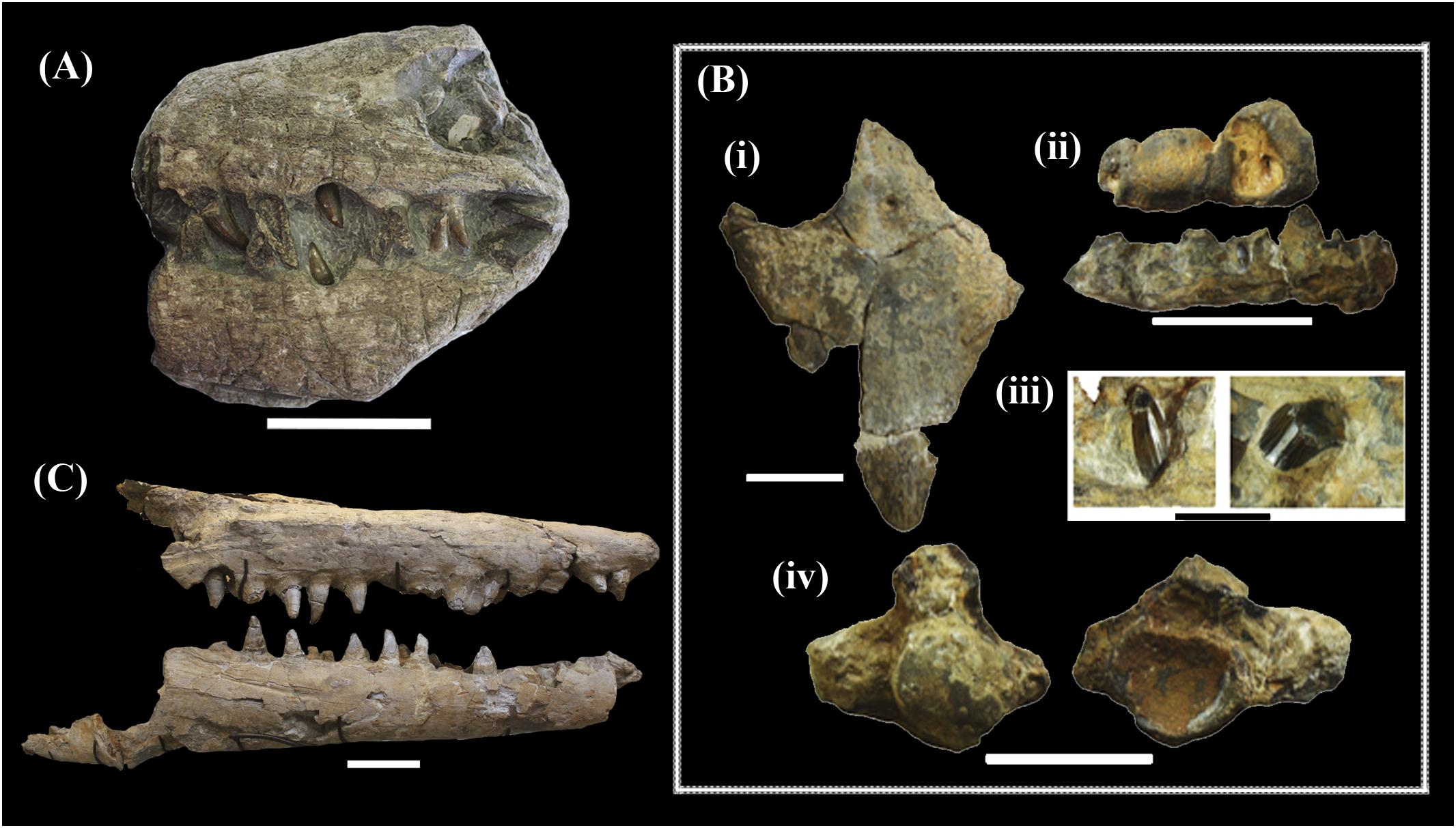
Fragmentary fossil remains of various tylosaurines, specimens A and B being attributed to T. 'mikasaensis' and T. 'capensis', the latter of which is a chimera of mosasaurines and tylosaurines

Throughout the remainder of the 20th century, Tylosaurus capensis was generally viewed as a valid species within the genus, being identified primarily by the size of the parietal foramen and the suture between the frontal and parietal bones. However, both characteristics are highly variable within the genus Tylosaurus and are not considered diagnostic at the species level. In 2016, Paulina Jimenez-Huidobro published a thesis which analyzes the deep relationships between the various tylosaurines. Based on observations of the specimen SAM-PK-5265, she proposes moving this species to Taniwhasaurus, claiming that the characteristics found there are closer to this latter than to Tylosaurus. In 2019, Jimenez-Huidobro and Caldwell reaffirm this proposition, but found that the fossils were too poorly preserved to identify definitively to the genus. In 2022, an anatomical review of South African mosasaurs analyzed SAM-PK-5265 and found the specimen to be a chimera of two different mosasaur genera, but not identifiable at the species level: the frontoparietal complex and the posterior dentary fragment without teeth represent cf. Prognathodon, while the anterior dentary fragment with replacement teeth represents cf. Taniwhasaurus.

==== T. 'mikasaensis' ====
In June 1976, a large front part of a mosasaur skull was discovered on a bank of the Ikushumbetsu River in Hokkaidō, Japan. This specimen was found in a floating concretion, and its formation of origin was identified with the Kashima Formation, in the Yezo Group, the locality being the exposed area of this same place. Like the previously mentioned sites, the formation from which the animal was found is dated to the Santonian-Campanian stage. The specimen, cataloged MCM.M0009, was informally named "Yezosaurus mikasaensis" in a press release issued by Kikuwo Muramoto and Ikuwo Obata on November 30, 1976, before being erroneously classified as a tyrannosauroid dinosaur in an article published by Muramoto in December of the same year. The genus name "Yezosaurus" comes from Yezo, the group containing the Kashima Formation from which the taxon was discovered, and from the Ancient Greek σαῦρος (saûros, "lizard"), all literally meaning "Yezo lizard". The specific epithet "mikasaensis" is named after the city of Mikasa, a place near the site of discovery. In the same year before the informal description, the Japanese Ministry of Education decided to consider the fossil as the country's national treasure. The specimen would later be known as "Mikasa's Creature" (Note: Japanese: エゾミカサリュウ, Hepburn: Yezo Misaka-Ryu).

In 2008, Caldwell and colleagues formally redescribed the specimen as a new species of Taniwhasaurus, T. mikasaensis. In the 2016 thesis by Jimenez-Huidobro, three sets of fossils discovered in the original locality were listed and attributed to this proposed species. These consist of additional cranial parts (MCM.A600), two dorsal vertebrae (MCM.M10) and caudal vertebrae elements associated with an isolated dorsal vertebra (MCM.A1008). In 2019, the phylogenetic revision of tylosaurines conducted by Jimenez-Huidobro and Calwell still considers the specimen to be a representative of the genus Taniwhasaurus, but the authors argued that the fossils are insufficient for a diagnosis to classify it as a distinct species, so they reclassified it as an indeterminate species of Taniwhasaurus. In 2020, 3D scans were performed on replicas of the specimen, with the real fossil requiring special permission from the Japanese Ministry of Education.

== Description ==
=== Size ===
Although fossils of Taniwhasaurus are incomplete, existing remains suggest the genus was a medium-sized mosasaur shorter than its relative Tylosaurus. The largest known specimen of T. oweni is the partial skull specimen SMU NMNZ R1532, which was estimated to have measured 86.9 cm (34.2 in) long, resulting in a total body length estimate of 6.72 m (22.0 ft).^{Table S1} T. antarcticus represents a smaller species, with the holotype having a skull length of 72 cm (28 in).

=== Skull ===
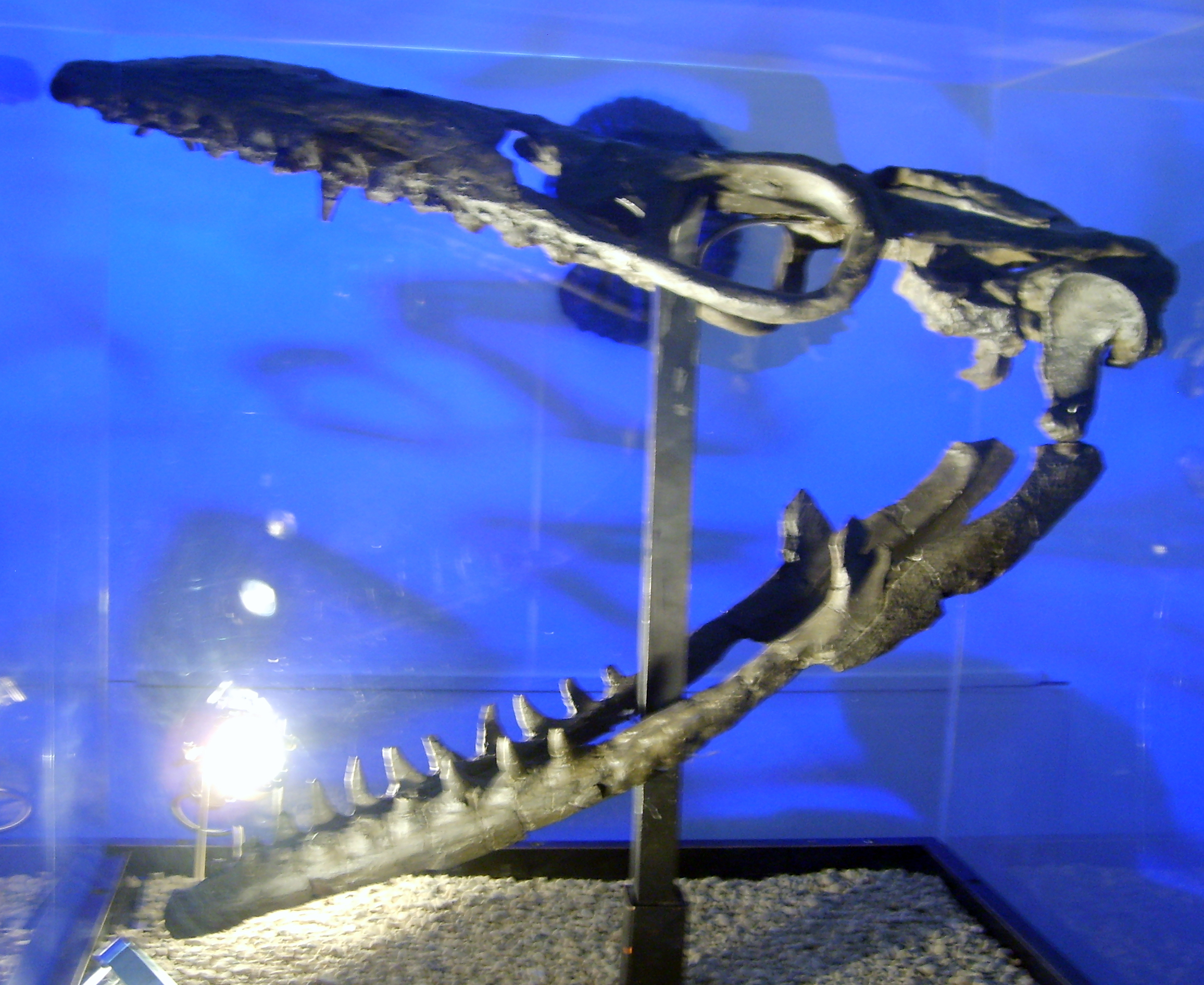
Reconstructed skull of the holotype specimen of T. antarcticus, on temporary display in Copenhagen, Denmark

In dorsal view, the skull of Taniwhasaurus is triangular in shape. Like other tylosaurines, the skull of is characterized by the presence of an edentulous rostrum, an anterior process to the dentary bone, and an exclusion of the frontal from the margin of the orbit. The snout of T. oweni is rather straight, while in T. antarcticus it is curved. The external nostrils turn out to be curved backwards. The rostrum of Taniwhasaurus has a dorsal crest and the frontal bone has a sagittal keel. The lateral margins of the frontal are straight. The genus also has a quadrate bone with the main diaphysis deviated laterally, as well as a pronounced, ventromedially directed process of the suprastapedial. These features essentially lock the posterior movement of the jaws to the maximum posterior rotation of the quadrate. The premaxilla of Taniwhasaurus bears a longitudinal crest on the anterior half of its dorsal surface, unlike that of Tylosaurus in which the dorsal surface of the premaxilla is smooth. Like other tylosaurines, this process is extremely well developed, extending the equivalent distance of the two tooth bases of the maxillae. The ascending process of the maxilla is relatively low and rounded, and the articulation with the prefrontal is a long, gently sloping suture. Thus, the maxilla of Taniwhasaurus is largely excluded from contact with the frontal. The angle described by the descending and horizontal branches of the jugal bone is consistent with the angle observed in mosasaurs of the plioplatecarpine group. The mandible of Taniwhasaurus is characterized for having a slender structure and an unusually high coronoid process.

=== Teeth ===
The teeth of Taniwhasaurus have vertical ridges that fade near their tips, and the anterior teeth lack posterior keels. The number of teeth present in T. oweni and T. antarcticus vary between the two. The other two species assigned to the genus, T. 'capensis' and T. 'mikasaensis', are only known from partial remains, so no conclusions can be drawn regarding their actual number of teeth. In the maxillary teeth, T. oweni has 14, while T. antarcticus has 12. At the level of the dentary bones, T. oweni has 15 teeth, while T. antarcticus has 13. In both species there are only 2 teeth in the premaxillae. The exact number of teeth in the pterygoid bones are unknown due to lack of complete fossil regarding this part.

=== Postcranial skeleton ===
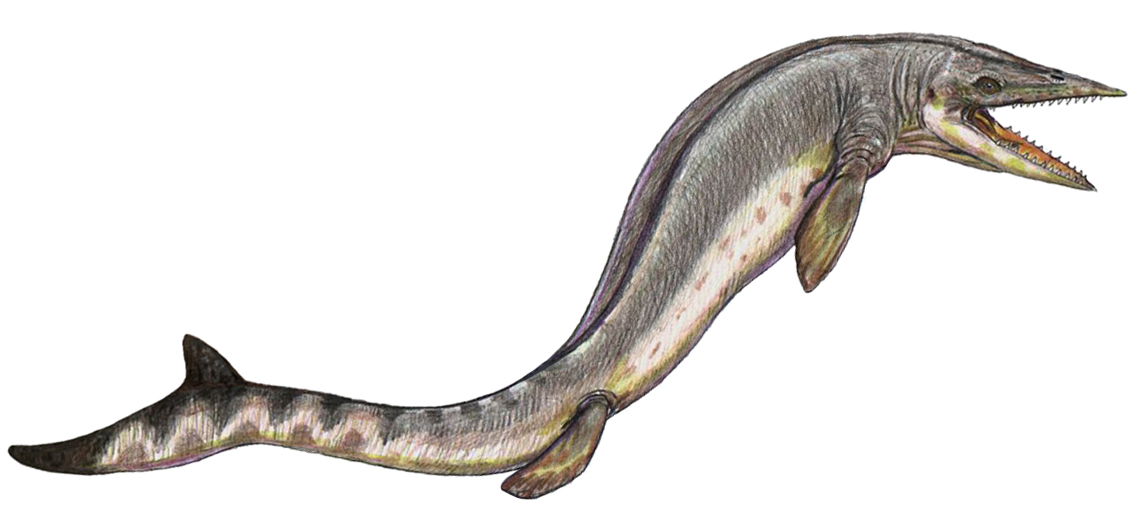
Life restoration

The exact number of vertebrae in Taniwhasaurus is unknown, but the rare fossils concerning this part of the body include the cervical, dorsal, lumbar and caudal vertebrae. (Note: The majority of known Taniwhasaurus vertebrae come from T. oweni, those of T. antarcticus being known only by a cervical, dorsal and caudal vertebrae.) As in other tylosaurines, the articular condyles of the cervical vertebrae of Taniwhasaurus are slightly depressed. The neural arch of the atlas has processes that would have ensured the protection of the spinal cord and the fixation of the muscles that hold the head. The neural spine of the axis is stout and elongated, culminating posterodorsally in a broad, flattened, incomplete spike that probably bore a cartilaginous cap. The dorsal vertebrae are proceles, and are characterized to have a greater diameter at the anterior level than posterior. The articular surfaces are placed obliquely posterior to the general axis of the spine. The neural arch is continuous with the anterior parts of the centra, and articulated by bold transverse processes. The condyle of the dorsal vertebrae is broad and circular while the robust parapophysis extends laterally for some distance.

The caudal vertebrae have tall, straight neural spines that lack any processes or zygosphene-zygantrum articulation, a joint found in most squamates. The caudal vertebrae have a small, triangular-shaped neural tube. The centrum is shortened on the rostro-caudal side but is elongated dorso-ventrally and compressed laterally, resulting in a ventrally oval rather than circular condyle as seen in presacral vertebrae. The caudal vertebrae of Taniwhasaurus have craniocaudal centra not fused to the hemal arch, which is a typical case in tylosaurines. Hemal arches articulate with deep hemapophyses but do not fuse with them. Distally, the right and left halves merge midway from the ventral tip of the element, creating a large anterior ridge on the vertebral column.

The ribs of T. oweni are flattened and somewhat dilated at their insertion. The rare preserved ribs show convex articular surfaces and they appear to be articulated on a rough surface, placed on the anterior and superior parts of the vertebral centra. Although the shoulder girdle is incompletely known in Taniwhasaurus, it appears to be broadly similar in morphology to what is found in tylosaurines in general. The coracoid is much larger than the scapula, and both of these bones are convex in shape. The coracoid plate is thin and distal to the coracoid foramen, but there is no presence of emargination on the medial edge. The humerus is very short in relation to its width, being flattened in shape and having a very recurved elbow joint. This same humerus has pronounced muscle ridges. The carp are remarkably flat and slender in shape, their edges being raised and rough. The rare fragments of phalanges indicate that they would have been cylindrical and elongated. This suggests that Taniwhasaurus would have had a muscular and powerful humerus that would have been short and wide, with paddle-shaped bones, indicating that it would have been an efficient swimmer.

== Classification ==
Taniwhasaurus was always classified within the mosasaurs, but the initial description published by Hector in 1874 does not attribute it to any subtaxon of this family. Indeed, Hector classifies Taniwhasaurus in a simplified manner in the order Pythonomorpha, a proposed taxon including mosasaurs and snakes ancestors. (Note: The validity of this squamate clade is still debated, with some authors considering mosasaurs to be closer to monitor lizards. However, recent phylogenetic analysis maintain that snakes would be the closest current relatives of mosasaurs, a position approaching the original definition of the taxon.) In 1888, Taniwhasaurus was moved to the genus Platecarpus by Lydekker, considering it a junior synonym. In 1897, Williston named the subfamily Platercarpinae and placed Taniwhasaurus in this group, considering it as a close relative to Platecarpus and Plioplatecarpus. In 1967, paleontologist Dale Russell synonymized Platecarpinae with Plioplatecarpinae due to the principle of priority and their similar taxonomic definitions. (Note: The Plioplatecarpidae family was named by Louis Dollo in 1884, while the taxon Platecarpinae was named by Williston in 1897. According to ICZN regulations, with justifiable exceptions, if a taxon is found to be a junior synonym of another previously named taxon, then the first name should be retained. Russell, noting that the definition of the two taxa are similar, moved the Plioplatecarpidae as a subfamily, renaming it to Plioplatecarpinae.) Russell, however, classifies Taniwhasaurus within the subfamily Mosasaurinae, and more precisely in the tribe Plotosaurini. Russell, considering that the postcranial morphology of Taniwhasaurus would be similar to that of Plotosaurus, provisionally assigns it as its sister taxon.

It was in 1971 that Taniwhasaurus was moved within the Tylosaurinae by Welles and Gregg, on the basis of cranial characteristics bringing it closer to the genus Tylosaurus. Later discoveries of other tylosaurines, previously mentioned as belonging to distinct genera and which are now considered synonymous to Taniwhasaurus, will confirm Welles and Gregg's proposal on the phylogenetic position of this genus. The members of this subfamily, including the related genus Tylosaurus and possibly Kaikaifilu, are characterized by a conical, elongated rostrum that lacks teeth. In 2019, in their phylogenetic review of this group, Jiménez-Huidobro and Caldwell believe that Taniwhasaurus cannot be considered with certainty to be monophyletic, because some named species have too fragmentary fossils to be assigned concretely to the genus. However, they consider that by ignoring the problematic material, Taniwhasaurus forms a taxon well and truly monophyletic and distinct from Tylosaurus. A study published in 2020 by Daniel Madzia and Andrea Cau suggests a paraphyletic relationship of Tylosaurus, considering that Taniwhasaurus would have evolved from this latter, around 84 million years ago. However, this claim does not appear to be consistent with previous phylogenetic analysis conducted on the two genera.

The following cladogram is modified from the phylogenetic analysis conducted by Jiménez-Huidobro & Caldwell (2019), based on tylosaurine species with materials known enough to model precise relationships: (Note: Several phylogenetic analysis have been carried out on Taniwhasaurus and Tylosaurus, including even the problematic species, but the stricter analyses only keep the species with the best preserved fossil material.)

- Mosasauroidea
  - Aigialosaurus
  - - Komensaurus
    - - Russellosaurina
        - - Tethysaurinae
          - Yaguarasaurinae
        - - Tylosaurinae
            - - Taniwhasaurus oweni
              - Taniwhasaurus antarcticus
            - - Tylosaurus nepaeolicus
              - - - Tylosaurus proriger
                  - Tylosaurus bernardi
                - - Tylosaurus pembinensis
                  - Tylosaurus saskatchewanensis
          - - Plioplatecarpinae
      - - Halisaurinae
        - Mosasaurinae

== Paleobiology ==
=== Rostral neurovascular system ===
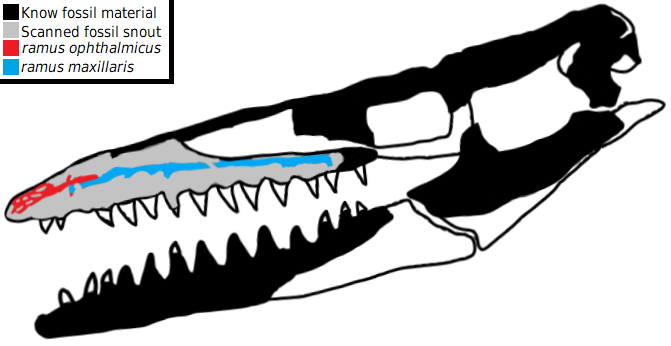
Diagram reconstructing the skull of T. antarcticus

A study published in 2020 based on CT scans of the rostrum of the holotype of T. antarcticus reveals the presence of several internal foramina located in the most forward part of the snout. These foramina, the ramus maxillaris and ramus ophthalmicus are abundantly branched and have the particularity of being directly connected to the trigeminal nerve, indicating that they would have sent sensitive information from the skin of the snout to the brain. This means that Taniwhasaurus would have had an electro-sensitive organ capable of detecting the slightest movement of prey underwater. This neurovascular system is comparable to those present in various living and extinct aquatic tetrapods, such as cetaceans, crocodilians, plesiosaurs and ichthyosaurs, which are used to stalk prey in low light conditions.

The study mentions that T. antarcticus is the first mosasaur identified to have such structures that could explain this, but it is likely that this type of organ is present in related genera. Several mosasaurs have large foramina similar to those present in Taniwhasaurus, which seems to indicate a widespread condition within the group. Additionally, tylosaurines appear to display the largest foramen at the snout among mosasaurs. This condition can be correlated with the toothless snout that characterizes the morphology of this subfamily, but further studies are needed to validate these two hypotheses.

=== Muscularity ===
==== Neck mechanics ====
The prezygapophyses of T. antarcticus are not as developed, which indicated that this musculature would be less pronounced than in other mosasaurs. The prezygapophyses of the cervical vertebrae mark the location of the longissimus and semispinalis muscles, which partly produce the lateral flexions of the body in reptiles. The little development of crests in the cervical indicates that the gripping surface of the named muscles would consequently be smaller than in other mosasaurs, as well as the force produced by these muscles. T. antarcticus would therefore have had great capacity for lateral movement of the neck, although the muscles anchored there would not have had great strength. Along the same lines, the reduced prezygapophyses indicated that the cervical vertebrae had a looser connection to each other, as they exhibited a reduction in the area of articulation between them. The related genus Tylosaurus would not have had overly pronounced neck mobility due to backward-curving neural spines, which more closely attaches one vertebra to another by means of ligaments and axial musculature. Although vertebrae were not found with complete neural spines in Taniwhasaurus, centra compression values indicate that although it may have had some restriction to lateral movement, it would have been more pronounced anyway.

==== Mobility ====
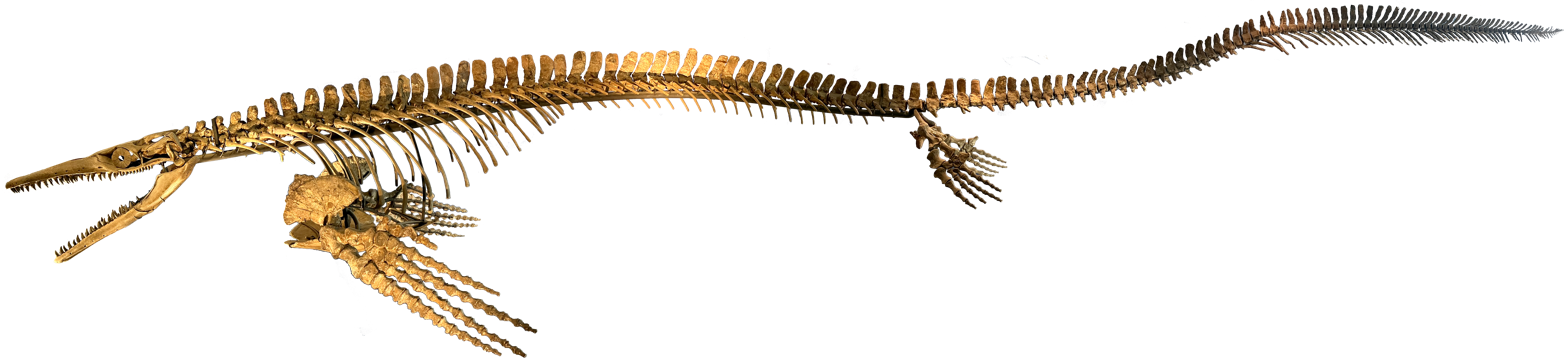
The mobility of Taniwhasaurus would have been greatly similar to the mosasaurine Plotosaurus

Although the dorsal and caudal vertebrae of T. antarcticus are poorly preserved, they follow a very similar morphology to that of Tylosaurus and Plotosaurus. The pygal vertebrae, which are derived caudal vertebrae, are interpreted as a bearing area that would have great flexibility. This part of the caudal vertebrae consists of a very similar in morphology to each other, and is represented in Taniwhasaurus only by intermediate caudal vertebrae.

The terminal caudal vertebrae would support the caudal fin and, as in Plotosaurus, these have a subcircular section in the anterior region and turn into an ovoid shape compressed laterally posteriorly. However, this configuration does not allow one to assess whether or not there is a tendency for high numbers of pygal vertebrae at the expense of intermediate caudals, as seen in derived mosasaurines. It was suggested that Rusellosaurina, the clade including tylosaurines and related lineages, had a plesiomorphic axial skeleton and that therefore their swimming would be less developed, quite the opposite of mosasaurines, which would have had carangiform swimming, that is to say forms where the tail is the main source of propulsion, while the most anterior part of the body maintains restricted movement. However, a thesis published in 2017 proves that Tylosaurus had a powerful and fast swim, due in particular to the regionalization of the caudal vertebrae, although less marked than in more derived mosasaurines.

The analyzes concerning the dorsal and caudal vertebrae in Plotosaurus and Tylosaurus are similar to those found in modern cetaceans, and that therefore these would also have a carangiform swimming shape. The relative measurements of the vertebral centra, of the morphological and phylogenetic proximity with Tylosaurus, seem to indicate that the tail of T. antarcticus would also have a very important role in movement, confirming this hypothesis. However, the cervical vertebrae of Taniwhasaurus show an unusual range of motion in a carangiform swimmer, perhaps wider than in any other mosasaur due to the lateral compression of the vertebral centra in this area, but also at their length. Based on this evidence, it is accepted that although the entire vertebral column of T. antarcticus would have had great mobility, the tail would be the main source of propulsion, supporting the trend towards more carangiform forms, placing Taniwhasaurus somewhere between the forms eel-shaped basals and carangiform-derived forms. This is in agreement with the phylogenetic position of this taxon.

== Paleoecology ==
Excluding the species T. 'mikasaensis', the presence of T. oweni and T. antarcticus shows that the genus would have been endemic to Gondwana, and more specifically in the Cretaceous Austral Fauna of the Weddellian Province, a geographic area including Antarctica, New Zealand and Patagonia. It is notably the first mosasaur genus known to be endemic to this area. The chimeric T. 'capensis' also partially supports that the genus is endemic to Gondwana, with the anterior dentary fragment representing cf. Taniwhasaurus. However, the indeterminate tooth crown specimens identified as Taniwhasaurus sp. from the Santonian-aged strata of the Southern Urals in European Russia challenge the proposed Gondwanan endemism of this genus.

=== New Zealand ===
T. oweni is known from the Conway Formation, and more specifically from Haumuri Bluff, a locality containing Lower and Middle Campanian fossils. The specific part of the site reaches a maximum thickness of 240 meters (790 ft) and lithologically the unit is a loosely cemented massive gray siltstone with locally limited interbeds of fine sandstone. The cores of the concretions present in the formation appear to be fossilized bones, shells or even wood, indicating that the environment of deposit would have been the lower zone of a foreshore. Molluscs known from this area include the ammonite Kossmaticeras and the bivalve Inoceramus. Many dinoflagellates are also known. Relatively few large fishes are known within the site from sources, the only clearly identified being the great rajiform ray Australopristis. Other mosasaurs identified include Mosasaurus mokoroa. (Note: The species, named by Welles and Gregg in 1971, although nominally classified within the genus Mosasaurus, is currently awaiting a taxonomic revision.) Among the plesiosaurs, no precise genus has been determined with the exception of the elasmosaurid Mauisaurus, which itself has been recognized as dubious since 2017. However, the fossils identified within the site come from plesiosaurids, elasmosaurids and polycotylids.

=== Antarctic ===
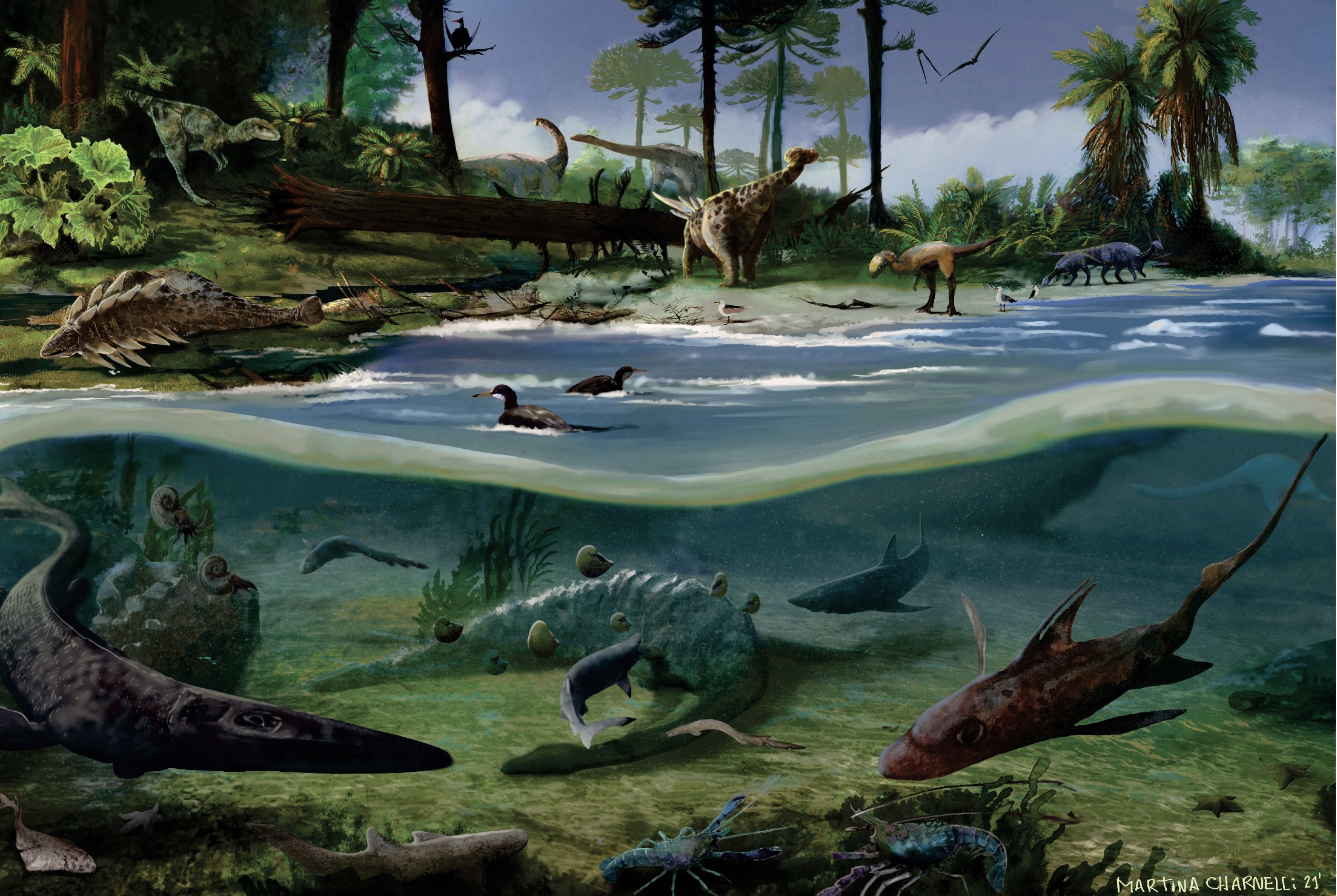
Reconstruction of the Snow Hill Island Formation's flora and fauna, with T. antarcticus shown lower left

T. antarcticus is known from Late Campanian deposits of the Antarctic Peninsula, in the Snow Hill Island Formation, located on James Ross Island. The taxon is known primarily from Member Gamma, a highly diverse site containing numerous fossils of marine and terrestrial faunas. This place consists of about 200 meters (660 ft) of sandstone and coquina inside the plateau, dominated mainly by molluscs of the group of bivalves and gastropods. The sandstones are mostly fine-grained, well-sorted, forming massive beds or bedded in parallel, with occasional bedding of waves and current ripples. Several bony fishes are present, including ichthyodectiforms, aulopiforms (mainly represented by Enchodus), albuliforms, as well as an indeterminate teleost. Cartilaginous fishes are mainly represented by holocephalians and sharks. Holocephalians include chimaerids, callorhinchids, rhinochimaerids as well as the massive species Edaphodon snowhillensis, which is one of the largest chimeriforms identified to date. Sharks present in the area include hexanchiforms, lamniforms, squatiniforms, squaliforms and synechodontiforms. Ammonites are also present. Several marine reptiles are known from this locality, but mosasaurs do not appear to be as diverse as in other nearby geological formations in Antarctica. The only ones clearly identified within member Gamma are T. antarcticus and an undetermined species of the very dubious genus Hainosaurus. The only known plesiosaurs from the Gamma Member are uncertain either belonging to the elasmosaurids or are considered indeterminate. Dinosaurs are also listed in this formation, including the ankylosaur Antarctopelta, the ornithopod Trinisaura and an unnamed lithostrotian sauropod, the latter being the first known sauropod from Antarctica.

== See also ==
- Tylosaurus
- Kaikaifilu
