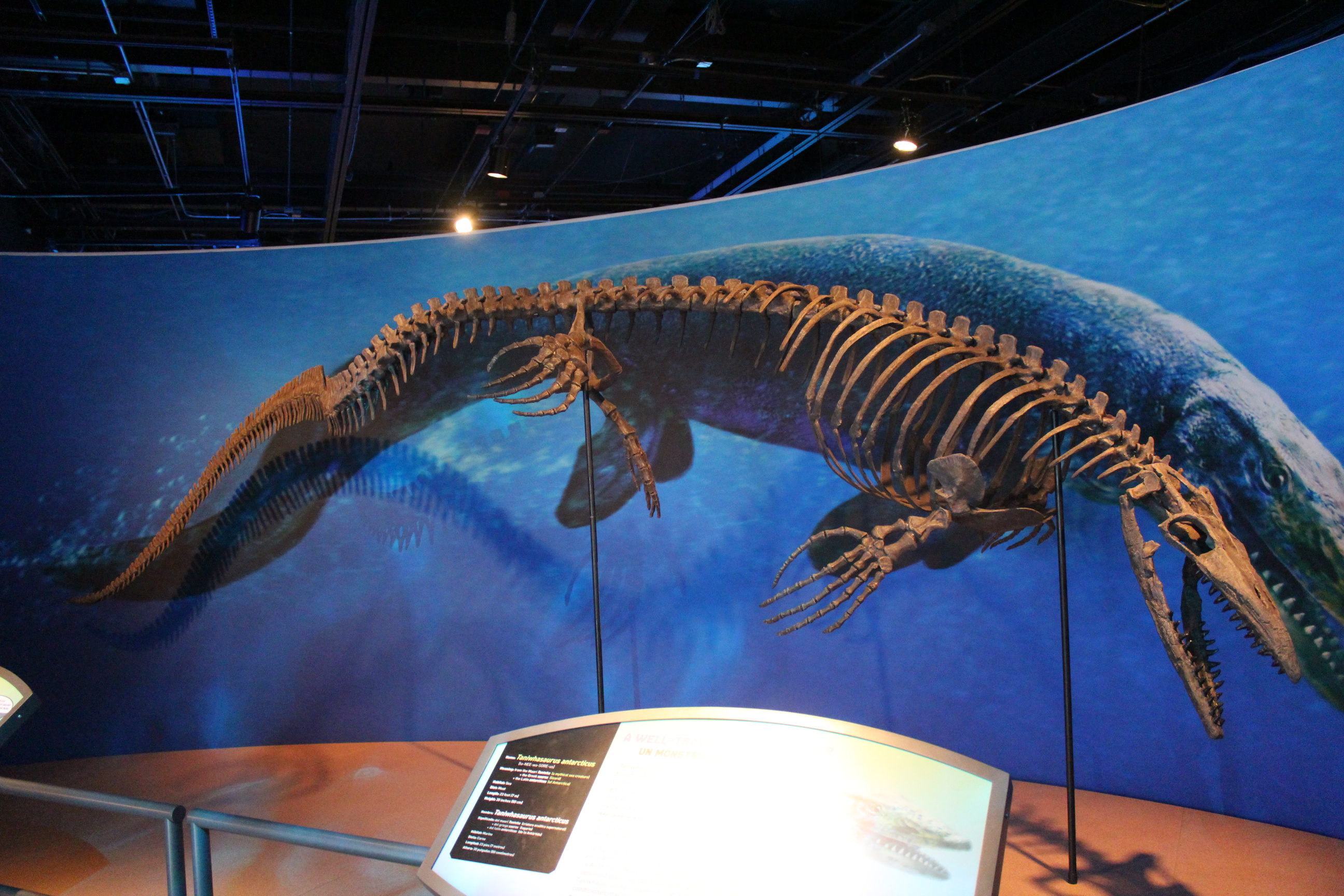
- Reconstructed skeleton of Taniwhasaurus antarcticus, Field Museum

Scientific classification
- Kingdom: Animalia
- Phylum: Chordata
- Class: Reptilia
- Order: Squamata
- Clade: †Mosasauria
- Family: †Mosasauridae
- Clade: †Russellosaurina
- Subfamily: †Tylosaurinae; Williston, 1895

Genera
- †Hainosaurus?; †Kaikaifilu?; †Taniwhasaurus; †Tylosaurus

= Tylosaurinae =

Tylosaurinae Temporal range: Late Cretaceous 89.3–66 Ma

Extinct subfamily of lizards

The Tylosaurinae are a subfamily of mosasaurs, a diverse group of Late Cretaceous marine squamates. Members of the subfamily are informally and collectively known as "tylosaurines" and have been recovered from every continent except for South America. The subfamily includes the genera Tylosaurus, Taniwhasaurus, Hainosaurus, and Kaikaifilu, although some scientists argue that only Tylosaurus and Taniwhasaurus should be included.

Tylosaurines first appeared in the Coniacian and gave rise to some of the largest mosasaurs within the genera Tylosaurus and Hainosaurus which came to dominate as apex predators in marine ecosystems throughout the Santonian and Campanian, but appear to have been largely replaced by large mosasaurines, such as Mosasaurus, by the end of the Maastrichtian. Nevertheless, the subfamily survived to the end of the Cretaceous, covering a period lasting approximately twenty million years.

The etymology of this group derives from the genus Tylosaurus (Greek tylos = "knob" + Greek sauros = "lizard").

== Description ==
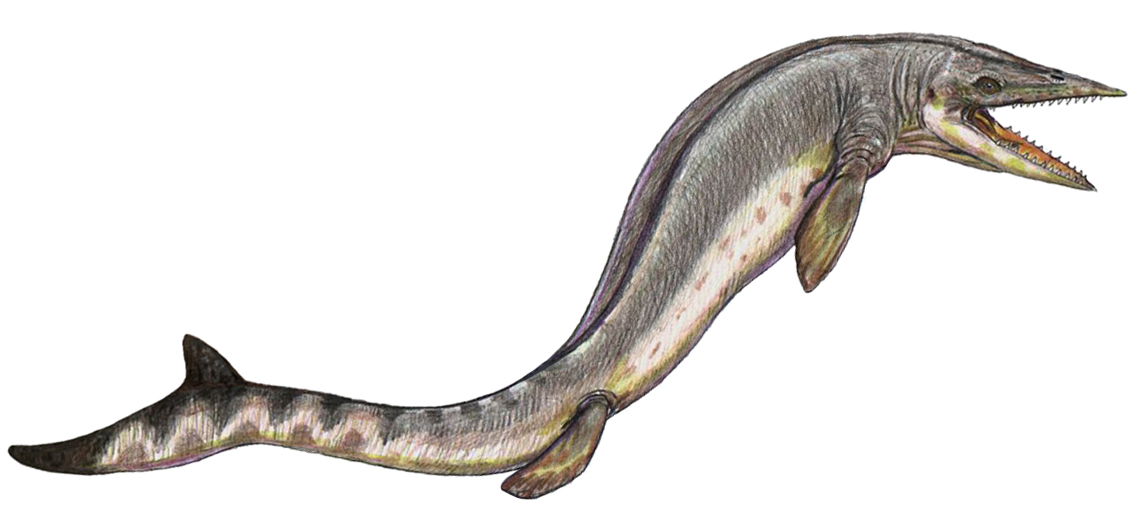
Reconstruction of Taniwhasaurus.

In general, tylosaurines were large-bodied marine lizards armed with sturdy, conical teeth and an elongated premaxilla and extensions of the dentaries that do not bear teeth to the very end such as is found in other genera of mosasaurs. Cope's original concept of a "battering ram" snout is not supported by fossil evidence. Stomach contents from a tylosaur recovered in South Dakota included remains of another mosasaur, a bony fish, the large, flightless seabird Hesperornis, and possibly a shark, indicating that tylosaurs were generalists. Another specimen collected by Charles Sternberg included the bones of a small plesiosaur (see also).

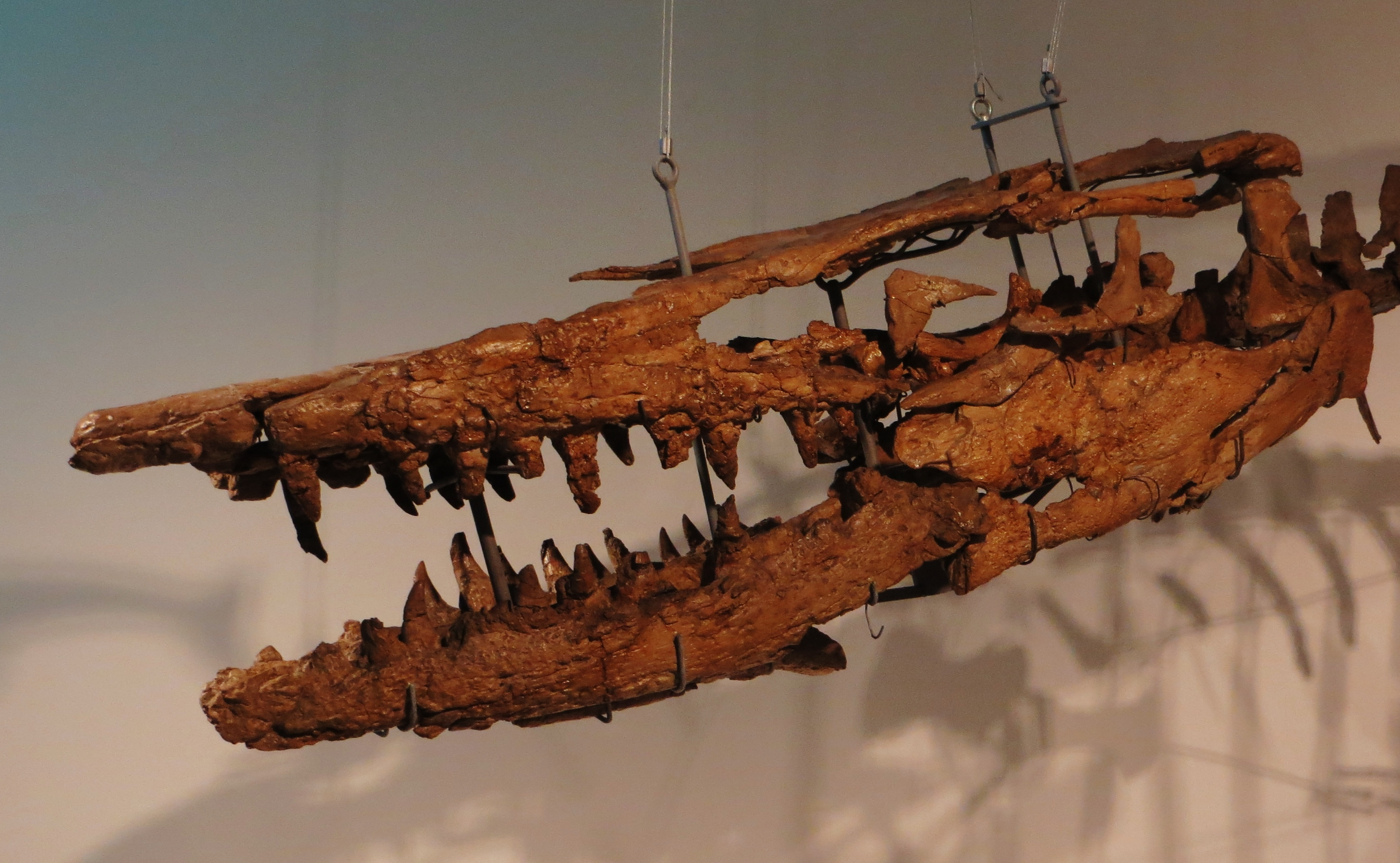
Holotype skull of Hainosaurus bernardi

Lingham-Soliar suggested that tylosaurines were not among the fastest swimming nor the strongest mosasaurids. However, they are lightly built, having greatly reduced the weight of their bodies and possessing relatively small pectoral and pelvic girdles, fore- and hindlimbs. Their bone is highly cancellous and may have been impregnated with fat cells during life, adding buoyancy. These traits suggest that tylosaurs may have been ambush predators. Tylosaurs were among the largest mosasaurs, with some species of Tylosaurus and Hainosaurus reaching lengths of 9-12+ meters, making them among the largest of all marine reptiles.

Russell (1967, pp. 170) defined the Tylosaurinae as follows: "Large rostrum present anterior to premaxillary teeth. Twelve or more teeth in dentary and maxilla. Cranial nerves X, XI, and XII leave lateral wall of opisthotic through a single foramen. No canal in basioccipital or basispehnoid for basilar artery. Suprastapedial process of quadrate moderately large, distally pointed. Dorsal edge of surangular rounded and longitudinally horizontal...Twenty nine presacral vertebrae present. Length of presacral series less than that of postsacral series in Tylosaurus, neural spines of posterior caudal vertebrae at most only slightly elongated, do not form an appreciable fin. Haemal arches unfused to caudal centra. Appendicular elements lack smoothly finished articular surfaces."

== Classification ==
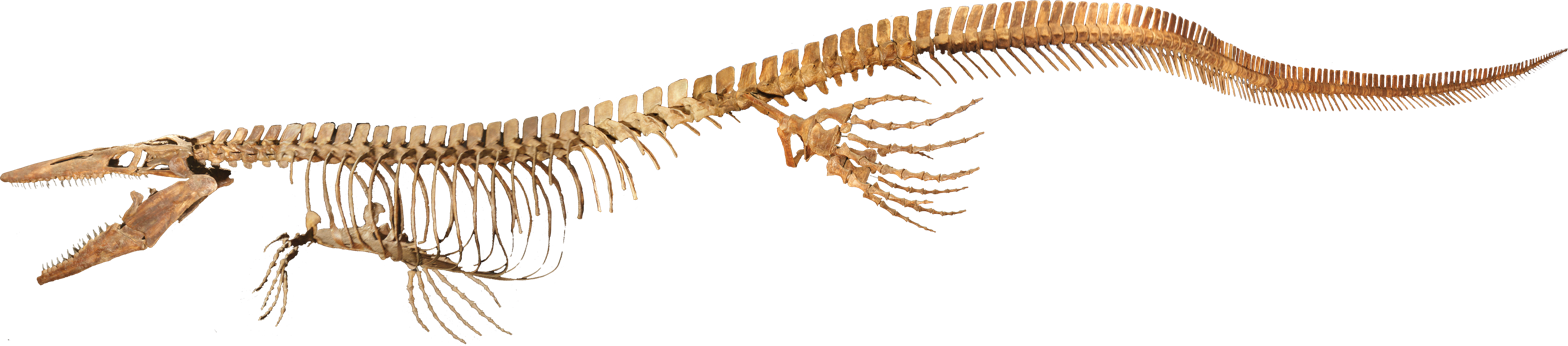
Mounted cast of the Tylosaurus rex "Bunker" specimen (KUVP 5033)

Tylosaurinae is a subfamily of the larger group Mosasauridae, and is considered to be most closely related to Plioplatecarpinae. The first modern cladistic analysis of mosasaurs was conducted by Gorden L. Bell in 1997, and all subsequent investigations of mosasaur phylogeny would follow it with few modifications to the methodology. Few subsequent studies would take a dedicated look at tylosaurines. A 2006 thesis by Timon Bullard would explore tylosaurine systematics, and found a Hainosaurus and Taniwhasaurus to represent basal tylosaurs outside of a monophyletic Tylosaurus (meaning all Tylosaurus species formed a natural grouping including no species outside of the genus). Kaikaifilu would later be proposed as an additional tylosaurine genus, but this has been dispusted. Later studies would question the anatomical distinction of Hainosaurus and Tylosaurus, and so reclassified all species of the former to the genus Tylosaurus. In 2019, Paulina Jiménez-Huidobro and Michael W. Caldwell would conduct a review of all tylosaur taxa and associated phylogenetic analysis. They supported a sister relationship between Taniwhasaurus and Tylosaurus, with the latter including former species of Hainosaurus. In particular, Tylosaurus proriger was found to be the sister taxon of "Hainosaurus" bernardi, while "Hainosaurus" pembinensis was sister to Tylosaurus' saskatchewanensis. The species Tylosaurus nepaeolicus was found to be the earliest diverging species of Tylosaurus.

In 2026, Amelia Zietlow and colleagues published a study recognizing the species Tylosaurus rex as distinct from T. proriger, and constructed a significantly revised phylogenetic analysis for the first time since 1997. They found that Tylosaurus formed a paraphyletic lineage which both Taniwhasaurus and Hainosaurus evolved from. They considered Taniwhasaurus too anatomically distinct to reclassify as part of Tylosaurus, and considered Hainosaurus appropriate to use as a genus nested within Tylosaurus due to its former species (as well as "T." saskatchewanensis) forming a monophyletic lineage with distinct anatomical traits. The remaining species of the Tylosaurus morphotype formed a series of outgroups gradually acquiring traits shared with the Hainosaurus through geologic time. T. nepaeolicus, the oldest species, remained the earliest diverging, followed by T. kansasensis (considered a synonym of T. nepaeolicus in the 2019 study), T. proriger, and the youngest species T. rex. As the phylogenetic dataset remained a work in progress and the results were therefore considered preliminary, they refrained from giving each species of Tylosaurus a distinct genus despite not forming a natural grouping.

The traditional 2019 topology is shown on the left, while the 2026 topology is shown on the right:

Topology A: Jiménez-Huidobro & Caldwell (2019)

- - Aigialosaurus
  - - Komensaurus carrolli
    - - Russellosaurina
        - - Tethysaurinae
          - Yaguarasaurinae
        - - Tylosaurinae
            - Taniwhasaurus
              - Taniwhasaurus oweni
              - Taniwhasaurus antarcticus
            - Tylosaurus
              - Tylosaurus nepaeolicus
              - - - Tylosaurus proriger
                  - Tylosaurus bernardi
                - - Tylosaurus pembinensis
                  - Tylosaurus saskatchewanensis
          - Plioplatecarpinae
      - - Halisaurinae
        - Mosasaurinae

Topology B: Zietlow et al. (2026)

- - Komodo dragon
  - - - Aigialosauridae
    - - Tylosaurinae
        - Tylosaurus nepaeolicus
        - - Tylosaurus kansasensis
          - - Tylosaurus proriger
            - - Tylosaurus rex
              - - Hainosaurus
                  - Hainosaurus bernardi
                  - - Hainosaurus gaudryi
                    - - Tylosaurus saskatchewanensis
                      - - Hainosaurus neumilleri
                        - Hainosaurus pembinensis
                - Taniwhasaurus
                  - Taniwhasaurus oweni
                  - Taniwhasaurus antarcticus
      - Mosasaurinae
