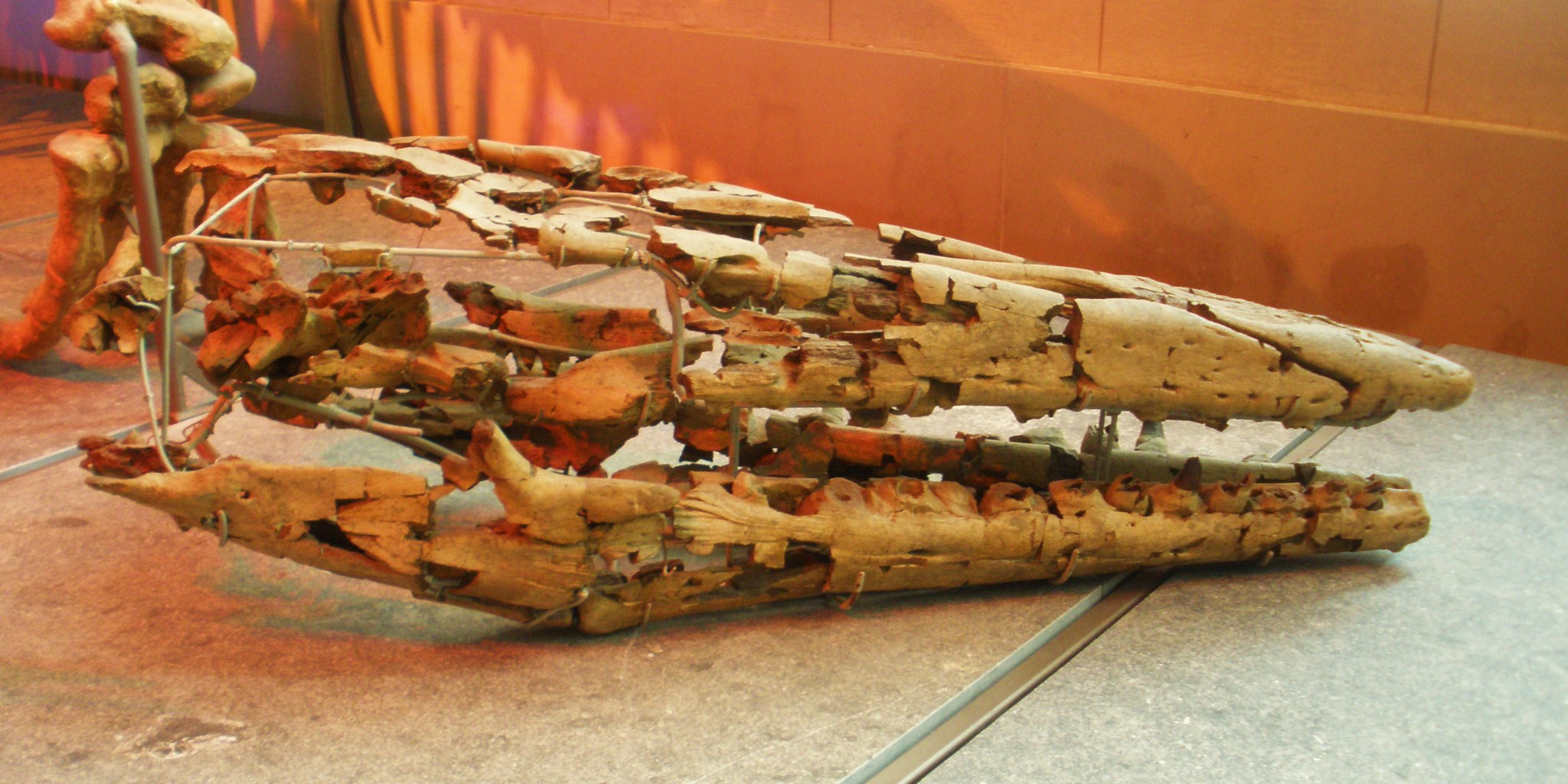
- Skull of H. bernardi, Natural History Museum of Belgium (Brussels)

Scientific classification
- Kingdom: Animalia
- Phylum: Chordata
- Class: Reptilia
- Order: Squamata
- Clade: †Mosasauria
- Family: †Mosasauridae
- Clade: †Russellosaurina
- Subfamily: †Tylosaurinae
- Genus: †Hainosaurus; Dollo, 1885

Type species
- †Hainosaurus bernardi Dollo, 1885

Species
- †H. gaudryi Thevenin, 1896; †H. pembinensis Nicholls, 1988; †H. neumilleri Martin, 2007; †H.? saskatchewanensis Jiménez-Huidobro et al., 2018

= Hainosaurus =

Hainosaurus Temporal range: Santonian-Maastrichtian, 84–66 Ma

Genus of mosasaurid marine reptile

Hainosaurus (Haino from the river Haine, where it was first discovered, and saurus, from Greek sauros, meaning lizard) is an potentially valid extinct genus of marine reptiles belonging to the mosasaur family. It is one of the largest mosasaurs, though its size has been revised more than once. At first it was estimated to be 17 metres (56 ft), and the largest mosasaurid. During the 1990s, its size was revised to 15 metres (49 ft) long; more recently, Johan Lindgren estimated that it reached lengths of up to 12.2 metres (40 ft). It was one of the top marine predators of the Late Cretaceous. Like other giant mosasaurs, this giant predator preyed on turtles, plesiosaurs, pterosaurs, cephalopods, sharks, fish, and smaller mosasaurs.

== History ==
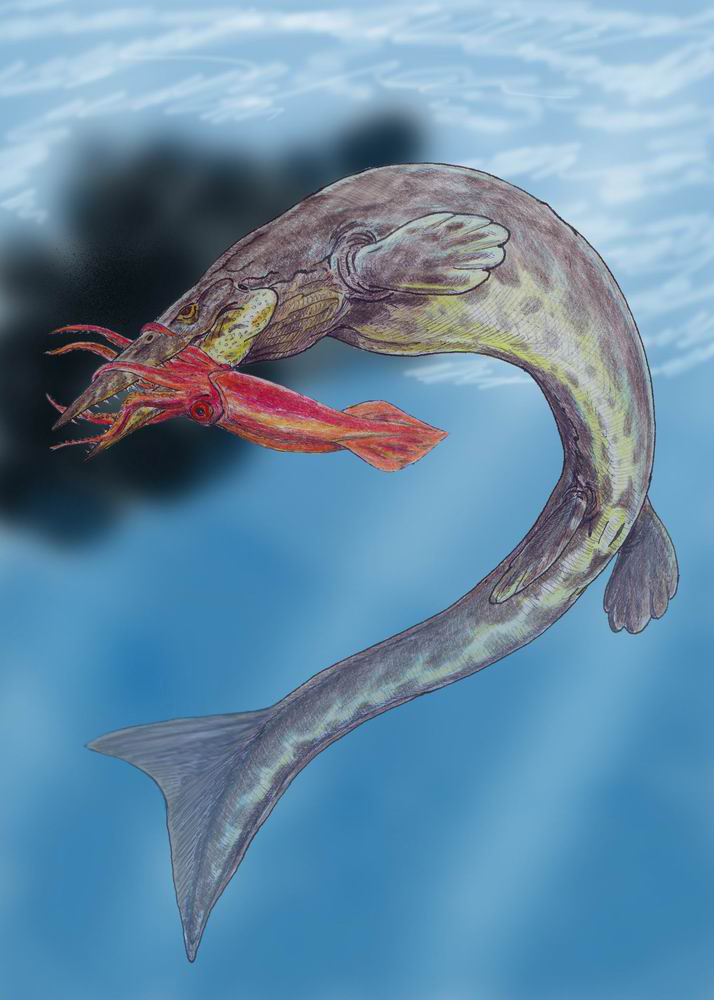
Restoration

In 1885, Louis Dollo described the genus Hainosaurus from a near-complete but poorly preserved skeleton excavated from a phosphate quarry in the Ciply Basin near the town of Mesvin, Belgium. The fossil was initially discovered as eight vertebrae by a worker in the January of the same year, who sold them to the Royal Belgian Institute of Natural Sciences. Based on information about the circumstances and locality of the discovery given the museum, it was recognized that the rest of the skeleton may have remained intact. In February, excavations were made under the authorization of an industrialist named Leopold Bernard, who managed the quarry the fossil resided in. The rest of the skeleton was recovered after a month of excavating between 500–600 cubic meters (650–780 cu yd) of phosphate, although a section of the tail was found to have been destroyed by erosion from an overlying deposit. The skeleton went to the museum, which was subsequently studied by Dollo, who recognized that it belonged to a new type of mosasaur. By instruction of the museum, he named it Hainosaurus bernardi. The prefix Haino- in the generic name refers to the Haine, a river located nearby the Ciply Basin, and thus combined with σαῦρος means "lizard from the Haine"; Dollo wrote that this was erected specifically to complement the etymology of Mosasaurus, which was similarly named in reference to a river near its type locality. The specific epithet bernardi was in recognition of Bernard, who made the excavation of the skeleton possible. The skeleton is now on display at the Royal Belgian Institute under the catalog number IRSNB R23.

A second species historically pertained to Hainosaurus was described by in 1988 by Elizabeth Nicholls based on a partial skeleton consisting of a partial skull, lower jaw, a near-complete vertebral column, and some limb bones recovered from the Pembina Member of the Pierre Shale in Manitoba, Canada. This skeleton resides in the Miami Museum in Miami, Manitoba cataloged as MT 2. Although Hainosaurus was previously only known in Europe, Nicholls (1988) argued that the new species differed from the more locally known Tylosaurus based on a higher count of pygal vertebrae, longer external nares, and femur longer than the humerus. The species was named Hainosaurus pembinensis, the specific epithet referring to the Pembina Member the skeleton was found in.

Estimated size range of Hainosaurus compared with a human.

In 2005, paleontologist Johan Lindgren suspected that Hainosaurus pembinensis was actually a species of Tylosaurus but stated that a better description of MT 2 was needed to be certain. In 2010, paleontologists Timon Bullard and Michael Caldwell redescribed such specimen. They argued that the pygal vertebrae reported by Nicholls (1988) actually belonged to another individual mosasaur, reducing the vertebral count in MT 2 to one that was indistinguishable with Tylosaurus. They also noted that the length of the external nares was within the known range of Tylosaurus and additionally argued that the femur being longer than the humerus was an insufficient characteristic to diagnose the species at the generic level. Based on these and other characteristics, the study found that the species cannot be referred to Hainosaurus and renamed it to Tylosaurus pembinensis. With this rediagnosis, the study also noted that the only confirmed characteristic that distinguished Hainosaurus from Tylosaurus at the time was a higher count of pygal vertebrae. It was doubted whether this would be sufficient for Hainosaurus to be a distinct genus but acknowledged that further research may provide additional characteristics. This further research was done in 2016 by Paulina Jimenez-Huidobro and Michael Caldwell, which reexamined H. bernardi. They found that the unique characteristics of the type species are indeed insufficient to warrant a distinction between Hainosaurus and Tylosaurus and declared the former as a junior synonym of the latter, thus renaming H. bernardi to Tylosaurus bernardi. However, some scientists argue that Hainosaurus should remain a distinct genus, justified by differences in tooth morphology unexplored by Jimenez-Huidobro & Caldwell (2016) such as the presence of an advanced cutting-based dentition in T. bernardi as opposed to a more general smashing-based dentition seen in other Tylosaurus species.

Following the proposal by Jiménez-Huidobro and Caldwell (2016) to synonymize Hainosaurus with Tylosaurus, the generic status of Hainosaurus has remained debated. Despite the synonymy, a series of subsequent papers by Longrich et al. continued to recognize Hainosaurus as a valid genus, using the name consistently in systematic, phylogenetic, and paleobiogeographic studies of Late Cretaceous mosasaurs. Likewise, a recent study by Bardet and colleagues retained Hainosaurus as a valid tylosaurine genus, reflecting that its taxonomic status remains an active area of research rather than a settled question.

A study by Amelia R. Zietlow et al. re-examined morphological diversity within Tylosaurinae and concluded that the Belgian taxon possesses a unique suite of cranial and dental characters inconsistent with inclusion in Tylosaurus. The study emphasized that previous synonymies relied heavily on postcranial anatomy while underestimating informative variation in the skull and dentition. In addition, its phylogenetic analysis recovered the historically recognized species of Hainosaurus, together with Tylosaurus saskatchewanensis, as more closely related to Taniwhasaurus than to other species traditionally assigned to Tylosaurus, supporting the recognition of Hainosaurus as a distinct tylosaurine lineage.

== Classification ==
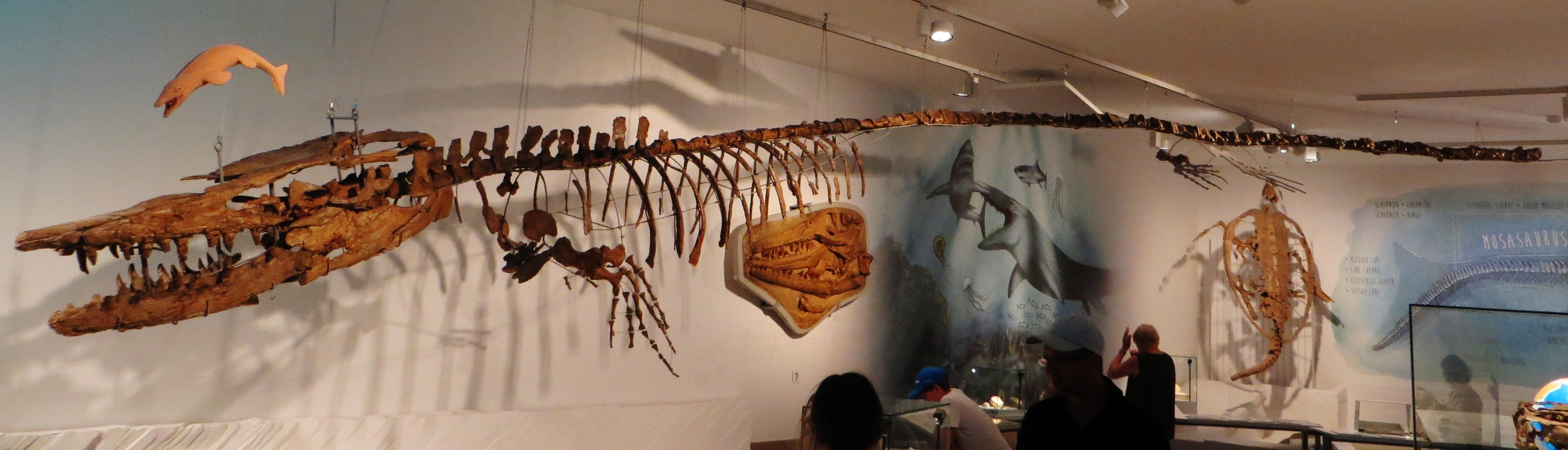
Mounted skeleton of Hainosaurus (IRSNB R23)

Hainosaurus is a member of the subfamily Tylosaurinae, and it is related to Tylosaurus. However, it has more vertebrae from the neck to the part of the tail with chevrons (53) than Tylosaurus (35). Both genera are large marine superpredators. Hainosaurus' tail has less chevron-bearing vertebrae, making it shorter than that of Tylosaurus. The type species of Hainosaurus is H. bernardi, named after the Belgian Léopold Bernard, owner of the phosphate chalk exploitation where the fossil was unearthed. In a paper published in 2016, Hainosaurus was considered a species of Tylosaurus, T. bernardi, which was found to be the sister taxon to the type species of Tylosaurus, T. proriger.

The following cladogram is modified from Zietlow et al. (2026).

- - Komodo dragon
  - - - Aigialosauridae
    - - Tylosaurinae
        - Tylosaurus nepaeolicus
        - - Tylosaurus kansasensis
          - - Tylosaurus proriger
            - - Tylosaurus rex
              - - - Hainosaurus bernardi
                  - - Hainosaurus gaudryi
                    - - 'Tylosaurus' saskatchewanensis
                      - - Hainosaurus neumilleri
                        - Hainosaurus pembinensis
                - - Taniwhasaurus oweni
                  - Taniwhasaurus antarcticus
      - Mosasaurinae
