= Sagittal keel =

Feature sometimes found in the human skull

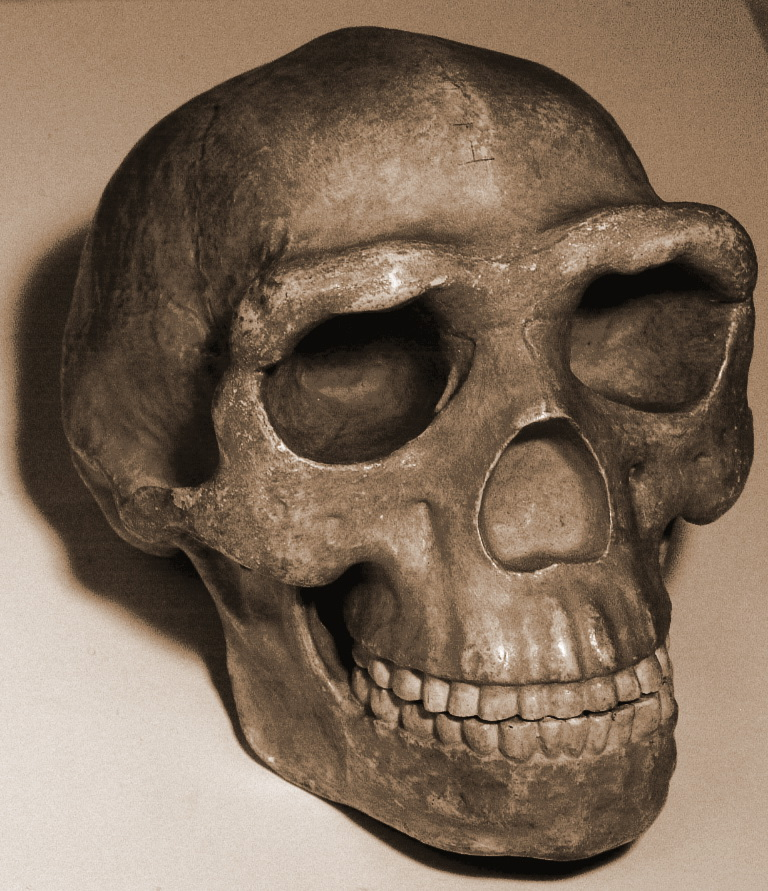
Cast of the Peking Man skull, showing the keel continuing onto the frontal bone

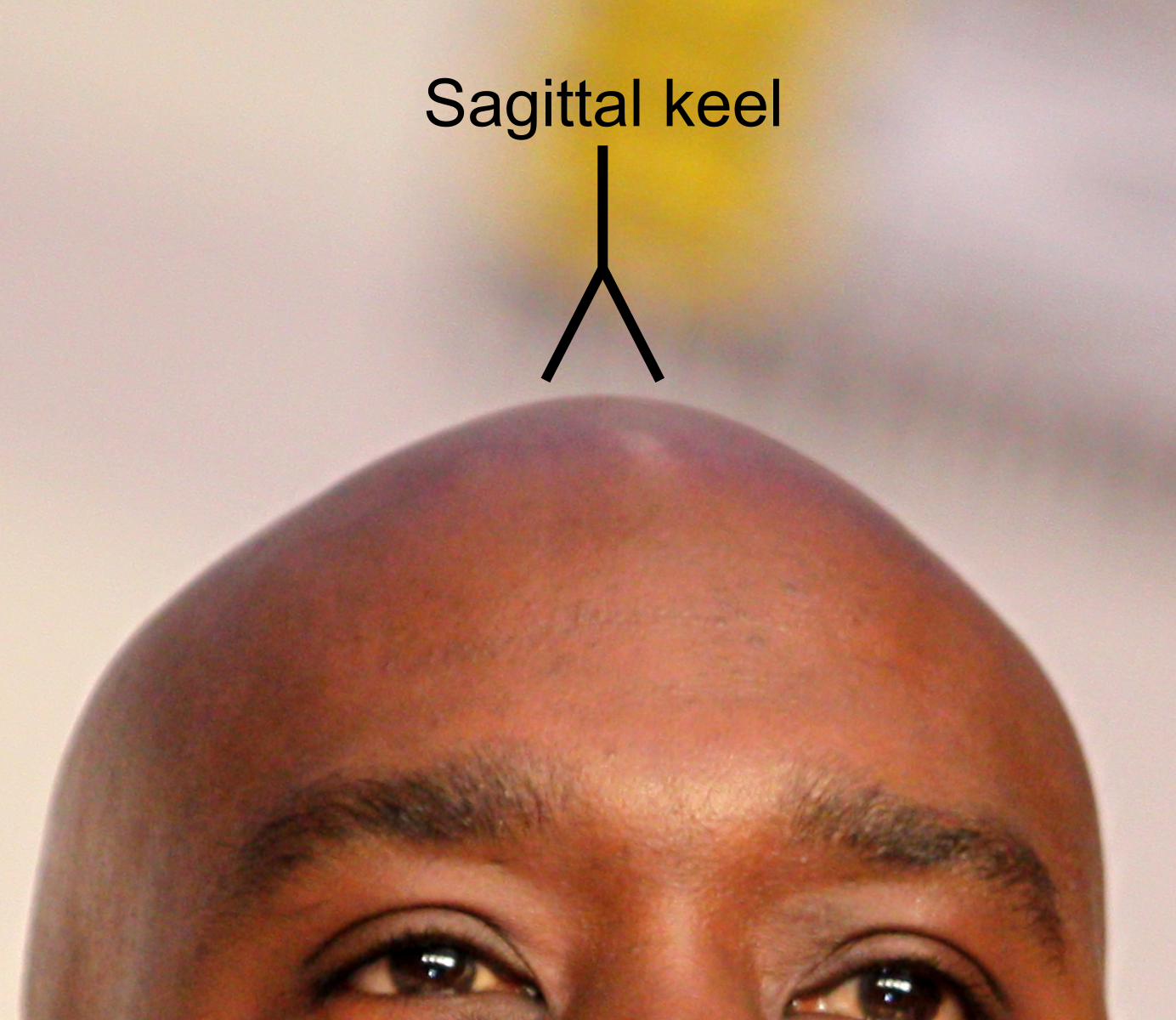
Sagittal keel as seen in modern Homo sapiens

In the human skull, a sagittal keel, or sagittal torus, is a thickening of part or all of the midline of the frontal bone, or parietal bones where they meet along the sagittal suture, or on both bones. Sagittal keels differ from sagittal crests, which are found in some earlier hominins (notably the genus Paranthropus) and in a range of other mammals. While a proper crest functions in anchoring the muscles of mastication to the cranium, the keel is lower and rounded in cross-section, and the jaw muscles do not attach to it.

Sagittal keels occur in several early human species, most noticeably in Homo erectus, occasionally in Homo heidelbergensis and in some Upper Paleolithic Homo sapiens specimens. Most modern Homo sapiens groups have lost them, likely as part of the general trend toward thinning of the cranial bones to make room for larger brains during the Pleistocene. However, there is a small portion of modern humans who have the feature, but its function and etiology are unknown. Actor Patrick Stewart and the martial artist Shi Yan Ming present good examples of modern humans (Homo sapiens sapiens) with this feature. The keel appears to be tied to general cranial robustness and is more common in adult men than women and absent in children.

== See also ==
- Occipital bun
- Sagittal crest
