= List of mosasaur-bearing stratigraphic units =

This is a list of stratigraphic units from which mosasaur body fossils have been recovered. Units listed are all either formation rank or higher (e.g. group). Formations are listed by continent, and alphabetically within the individual lists.

== Africa ==
Name	Age	Location	Genera and species
Akrabou Formation	Turonian	Morocco	Tethysaurus nopcsai
Bentiaba River	Maastrichtian	Angola	Prognathodon kianda; Liodon sp.; Halisaurus sp.; Platecarpus ptychodon; Phosphorosaurus sp.; Globidens phosphaticus; Mosasaurus hoffmannii; Prognathodon saturator
Bololo	Maastrichtian	Congo-Kinshasa	Halisaurus sp.; Mosasaurus sp.
Dukamaje Formation	Maastrichtian	Niger; Nigeria	Halisaurus sp.; Igdamanosaurus aegyptiacus; Platecarpus sp.; Angolasaurus sp.; Plioplatecarpus sp.; Goronyosaurus sp.; Goronyosaurus nigeriensis
Duwi Formation	Maastrichtian	Egypt	Mosasauridae indet.; Globidens phosphaticus; Igdamanosaurus aegyptiacus
Farin-Doutchi Formation	Maastrichtian	Niger	Pluridens walkeri
Lapurr Sandstone	Campanian-Maastrichtian	Kenya	Mosasauria indet.
Ouled Abdoun Basin	Maastrichtian	Morocco	Eremiasaurus heterodontus; Liodon anceps; Khinjaria acuta; Mosasaurus sp.; Mosasaurus beaugei; Stelladens mysteriosus; Globidens phosphaticus; Globidens simplex; Xenodens calminechari; Halisaurus arambourgi; Pluridens serpentis; Igdamanosaurus aegyptiacus; Platecarpus ptychodon; Gavialimimus almaghribensis; Prognathodon sp.; Prognathodon curii; Thalassotitan atrox; Carinodens belgicus; Carinodens minalmamar; Russellosaurina indet.
Itombe Formation	Coniacian	Angola	Mosasaurus sp.; Angolasaurus bocagei; Halisaurinae indet.
Umzamba Formation	Santonian	South Africa	Mosasaurus sp.

== Antarctica ==
Name	Age	Location	Genera and species
López de Bertodano Formation	Maastrichtian	Argentine Antarctica; British Antarctic Territory; Chilean Antarctic Territory	Mosasaurus sp.; Kaikaifilu hervei
Santa Marta Formation	Late Campanian	Argentine Antarctica; British Antarctic Territory; Chilean Antarctic Territory	Taniwhasaurus antarcticus
Snow Hill Island Formation	Maastrichtian	Argentine Antarctica; British Antarctic Territory; Chilean Antarctic Territory	Tylosaurinae indet.

== Asia ==
Name	Age	Location	Genera and species
Adaffa Formation	Early Campanian	Saudi Arabia	Prognathodon sp.; Plioplatecarpinae indet.
Amminadav Formation	Early Cenomanian	Palestinian Territory	Haasiasaurus gittelmani
Davutlar Formation	Late Maastrichtian	Turkey	Mosasaurus hoffmannii
Hakobuchi Formation	Early Maastrichtian	Japan	Mosasaurus hobetsuensis; Phosphorosaurus ponpetelegans
Izumi Group	Late Campanian - Maastrichtian	Japan	Kourisodon sp.; Mosasaurus sp.; Mosasaurus sp. "B"; Mosasaurinae indet.
Kashima Formation	Late Santonian	Japan	Taniwhasaurus mikasaensis
Mishash Formation	Campanian	Israel	Prognathodon curii
Muwaqqar Chalk Marl Formation	Late Maastrichtian	Jordan	Mosasaurus hoffmannii; Mosasaurus sevciki; Carinodens palistinicus; Harranasaurus khuludae; Prognathodon hashimi (=Tenerasaurus); Prognathodon hudae; Prognathodon primus; Clidastes sp.; Platecarpus sp.; Liodon anceps; Tylosaurinae indet.
Phosphorite Unit Formation	Late Campanian - Early Maastrichtian	Jordan	Mosasaurus sp.; Globidens hisaensis; Globidens sp.; Prognathodon abyadensis; Prognathodon currii; Prognathodon giganteus; Clidastes sp.; Halisaurus sp.; Platecarpus ptychodon; Platecarpus sp.; Liodon anceps; Mosasauridae indet.
Syria (various localities)	Late Campanian	Syria	Mosasauridae indet.; Mosasaurus lemmonieri; Prognathodon giganteus; Liodon anceps; Globidens sp.; Platecarpus ptychodon; Plioplatecarpinae indet.
Toyajo Formation	Campanian/Maastrichtian	Japan	Megapterygius wakayamaensis

== Europe ==
Name	Age	Location	Genera and species
Ahlen Formation	Late Campanian	Germany	Clidastes sp.
Argille di Viano Formation	Cretaceous	Italy	Mosasaurus hoffmannii
Baculites Limestone Formation	Late Maastrichtian	France	Prognathodon sp.
Bakla Hill	Maastrichtian	Ukraine	Carinodens belgicus; Liodon sp.
Båstad Basin	Campanian	Sweden	Plioplatecarpus sp.
Chalk Group	Cenomanian	United Kingdom	"Mosasaurus" gracilis
Craie de Ciply Formation	Maastrichtian	Belgium	Mosasauridae indet.; Mosasaurus hoffmannii; Prognathodon solvayi; Phosphorosaurus ortliebi; Plioplatecarpus houzeaui; Hainosaurus bernardi
Craie de Meudon Formation	Late Campanian	France	Hainosaurus sp.
Craie de Spiennes Formation	Late Campanian	Belgium	Globidens dakotensis; Prognathodon solvayi; Prognathodon giganteus
Danish White Chalk Formation	Maastrichtian	Denmark	Mosasaurus hoffmannii; Mosasaurus sp.; Plioplatecarpus sp.
Glauconie de Lonzée Formation	Santonian	Belgium	Hainosaurus sp.
Gulpen Formation	Late Campanian - Maastrichtian	Belgium; The Netherlands	Mosasaurus sp.; Prognathodon solvayi; Prognathodon saturator
Grünsandstein Formation	Cenomanian	Germany	Liodon anceps
Hesseltal Formation	Late Cenomanian/Early Turonian	Germany	Mosasauroidea indet.
Kajlâka Formation	Late Maastrichtian	Bulgaria	Mosasauridae indet.; Mosasaurus hoffmannii
Kristianstad Basin	Santonian - Maastrichtian	Sweden	Clidastes propython; Dollosaurus sp.; Eonatator sternbergii; Hainosaurus sp.; Platecarpus sp.; Taniwhasaurus ivoensis
Lagerdorf Formation	Late Santonian	Germany	Clidastes sp.
Maastricht Formation	Maastrichtian	The Netherlands	Mosasauridae indet.; Mosasaurus hoffmannii; Carinodens belgicus; Prognathodon saturator; Liodon sectorius; Plioplatecarpus marshi
Nay Marls Formation	Early Campanian - Late Maastrichtian	France	Liodon compressidens; Hainosaurus sp.; Prognathodon sp.
Opoka Formation	Late Campanian - Late Maastrichtian	Poland	Mosasaurus lemmonieri; Mosasaurus hoffmannii; Liodon anceps; Prognathodon sp.; Hainosaurus sp.
Polunino	Late Campanian	Volgograd Oblast: Russia	Mosasaurus sp.; Prognathodon sp.; Platecarpus sp.; Dollosaurus sp.; Hainosaurus sp.; Carinodens belgicus; Mosasauridae indet.
Raspay Formation	Late Maastrichtian	Spain	Prognathodon sp.
Rybushka Formation	Early Campanian	Saratov Oblast: Russia	Prognathodon sp.; Clidastes sp.
Scaglia Rossa Formation	Late Campanian - Maastrichtian	Italy	Mosasaurus sp.; Mosasaurus hoffmannii; Prognathodon sp.
Scaglia Rossa Veneta Formation	Early Turonian	Italy	Romeosaurus sorbinii; Romeosaurus fumanensis
Trevino	Maastrichtian	Spain	Mosasaurinae indet.; Prognathodon solvayi; Platecarpus tympaniticus; Liodon anceps
Vitoria Formation	Late Campanian	Spain	Liodon sectorius; Tylosaurus sp.
Vomb Trough	Santonian - Maastrichtian	Sweden	Hainosaurus sp.

== North America ==
Name	Age	Location	Genera and species
Arcadia Park Shale Formation	Middle Turonian	Texas: United States	Russellosaurus coheni
Bearpaw Shale Formation	Late Campanian	Alberta, Saskatchewan: Canada; Montana: United States	Prognathodon overtoni; Mosasaurus conodon; Plioplatecarpus primaevus; Clidastes sp.; Mosasaurus missouriensis
Black Creek Group	Early-Middle Campanian	North Carolina, South Carolina: United States	Mosasaurus sp.; Platecarpus sp.; Tylosaurus sp.
Blufftown Formation	Campanian	Georgia: United States	Mosasauridae indet.; Prognathodon sp.; Halisaurus sp.; Platecarpus sp.
Carlile Shale	Middle Turonian	Kansas: United States	Mosasauridae indet.; Russellosaurinae indet.
Cerro del Pueblo Formation	Late Campanian	Mexico	Clidastes sp.
Donoho Creek Formation	Middle Campanian	South Carolina: United States	Tylosaurus sp.; Mosasauridae indet.
Eutaw Formation	Early Campanian	Alabama, Mississippi: United States	Clidastes liodontus; Mosasaurus sp.
Hornerstown Formation	Maastrichtian	New Jersey: United States	Liodon sp.; Mosasaurus hoffmanni (=M.maximus); Plioplatecarpus sp.
Kamp Ranch Limestone Formation	Middle Turonian	Texas: United States	Dallasaurus turneri
Lewis Shale Formation	Campanian	Colorado: United States	Prognathodon overtoni
Mancos Shale Formation	Early Campanian	Colorado: United States	Prognathodon stadtmani
Marshalltown Formation	Middle Campanian	New Jersey: United States	Clidastes iguanavus; Halisaurus sp.
Merchantville Formation	Early Campanian - Maastrichtian	New Jersey, Delaware: United States	Clidastes iguanavus; Mosasaurus sp.; Halisaurus platyspondylus
Mesaderve Formation	Campanian	Wyoming: United States	Platecarpus sp.; Tylosaurinae indet.
Mooreville Chalk Formation	Late Santonian	Alabama: United States	Clidastes propython; Clidastes "moorevillensis"; Eonatator sternbergii; Globidens alabamaensis
Moreno Formation	Maastrichtian	California: United States	Plesiotylosaurus crassidens; Plotosaurus tuckeri; Plotosaurus bennisoni
Mount Laurel Formation	Maastrichtian	New Jersey, Delaware: United States	Halisaurus platyspondylus; Mosasaurus maximus; Mosasaurus sp.
Navesink Formation	Maastrichtian	New Jersey: United States	Mosasaurus sp.; Mosasaurus conodon; Mosasaurus maximus; Prognathodon rapax; Halisaurus platyspondylus; Mosasauridae indet.; Liodon sectorius
New Egypt Formation	Late Maastrichtian	New Jersey: United States	Mosasaurus maximus; Prognathodon rapax
Niobrara Formation	Coniacian - Campanian	Kansas: United States	Eonatator sternbergii; Tylosaurus nepaeolicus; Tylosaurus proriger; Plesioplatecarpus planifrons; Platecarpus tympaniticus; Clidastes liodontus; Clidastes propython
Ojinaga Formation	Turonian	Mexico	Tylosaurus kansasensis
Owl Creek Formation	Late Maastrichtian	Missouri: United States	Mosasaurus hoffmannii
Peedee Formation	Early-Late Maastrichtian	North Carolina, South Carolina: United States	Halisaurus sp.; Mosasaurus cf. beaugei; Mosasaurus cf. hoffmanni; Prognathodon cf. solvayi; ?Prognathodon sp.; Prognathodontini indet.; Tylosaurus sp.; Mosasauridae indet.
Pen Formation	Middle Santonian	Texas: United States	Clidastes liodontus; Ectenosaurus sp.
Pender Formation	Late Santonian	British Columbia: Canada	Kourisodon puntledgensis; Mosasauridae indet.
Pierre Shale Formation	Campanian	Nebraska, South Dakota: United States; Manitoba: Canada	Mosasaurus sp.; Clidastes sp.; Clidastes propython; Tylosaurus proriger; Tylosaurus pembinensis; Globidens alabamaensis; Globidens dakotensis; Globidens schurmanni; Platecarpus sp.; Mosasaurus missouriensis; Jormungandr walhallaensis; Plioplatecarpus primaevus; Prognathodon overtoni; Latoplatecarpus nichollsae; Latoplatecarpus willistoni
Ripley Formation	Late Campanian	Tennessee: United States	Mosasaurus maximus; Prognathodon sp.; Plioplatecarpus sp.
Selma Formation	Santonian	Alabama, Mississippi: United States	Globidens alabamaensis; Prognathodon sp.; Clidastes propython; Eonatator sternbergii; Platecarpus sp.; Tylosaurus sp.
Severn Formation	Maastrichtian	Maryland: United States	Mosasauridae indet.; Mosasaurus maximus; Mosasaurus conodon; Prognathodon rapax; Halisaurus platyspondylus
St. Mary River Formation	Campanian	Alberta: Canada	Plioplatecarpus sp.
Tar Heel/Coachman Formation	Early Campanian	North Carolina, South Carolina: United States	Prognathodon sp.; Platecarpus sp.; Halisaurus sp.; Tylosaurus sp.; Mosasauridae indet. (="Mosasaurus carolinensis")
Vermillion River Formation	Campanian	Manitoba: Canada	Platecarpus sp.; Tylosaurus sp.
Wolfe City Formation	Middle Campanian	Texas: United States	Mosasaurus missouriensis; Globidens dakotensis

== Oceania ==
Name	Age	Location	Genera and species
Conway Formation	Campanian	New Zealand	Taniwhasaurus oweni
Laidmore Formation	Campanian - Maastrichtian	New Zealand	Prognathodon waiparaensis
Miria Marl Formation	Maastrichtian	Australia	Plioplatecarpinae indet.; Mosasauridae indet.
Molecap Greensand Formation	Cenomanian - Santonian	Australia	Platecarpus sp.; Plioplatecarpinae indet.
Tahora Formation	Campanian - Maastrichtian	New Zealand	Moanasaurus mangahouangae
Takatika Grit		Chatham Islands	Mosasauridae indet.

== South America ==
Name	Age	Location	Genera and species
Alcântara Formation	Late Albian - Early Cenomanian	Brazil	Mosasauridae indet.
Calumbi Formation	Santonian - Late Campanian	Brazil	Globidens belgicus; Mosasaurus (Leiodon) anceps; Mosasaurus beaugei; Platecarpus sp.; Prognathodon sp.; Plioplatecarpus sp.; Angolasaurus sp.
Cotinguiba Formation	Early Cenomanian - Middle Coniacian	Brazil	Platecarpus sp.; Angolasaurus sp.
Gramame Formation	Maastrichtian	Brazil	Globidens belgicus; Globidens phosphaticus; Globidens sp.; Mosasaurus cf. anceps; Mosasaurus cf. beaugei; Mosasaurus beaugei; Eremiasaurus cf. heterodontus; Platecarpus sp.; Prognathodon sp.
Itamaracá Formation	Middle Campanian - Early Maastrichtian	Brazil	Carinodens belgicus; Globidens sp.; Mosasaurus anceps; Mosasaurus beaugei; Eremiasaurus cf. heterodontus; Platecarpus sp.; Prognathodon sp.; Plioplatecarpus sp.
La Frontera Formation	Late Turonian	Colombia	Yaguarasaurus columbianus; Mosasauridae indet.
Napo Formation	Turonian-Late Coniacian	Ecuador	Mosasauridae indet.
Olini Group, Nivel de Lutitas y Arenas	Campanian	Colombia	Eonatator coellensis
Quiriquina Formation	Late Maastrichtian	Chile	Halisaurus sp. (=Plotosaurus); Mosasaurinae indet.; Plioplatecarpinae indet.; Tylosaurinae indet.
Roca Formation	Maastrichtian	Argentina	Mosasaurinae indet.
Vivián Formation	Santonian	Peru	Halisaurus sp.
