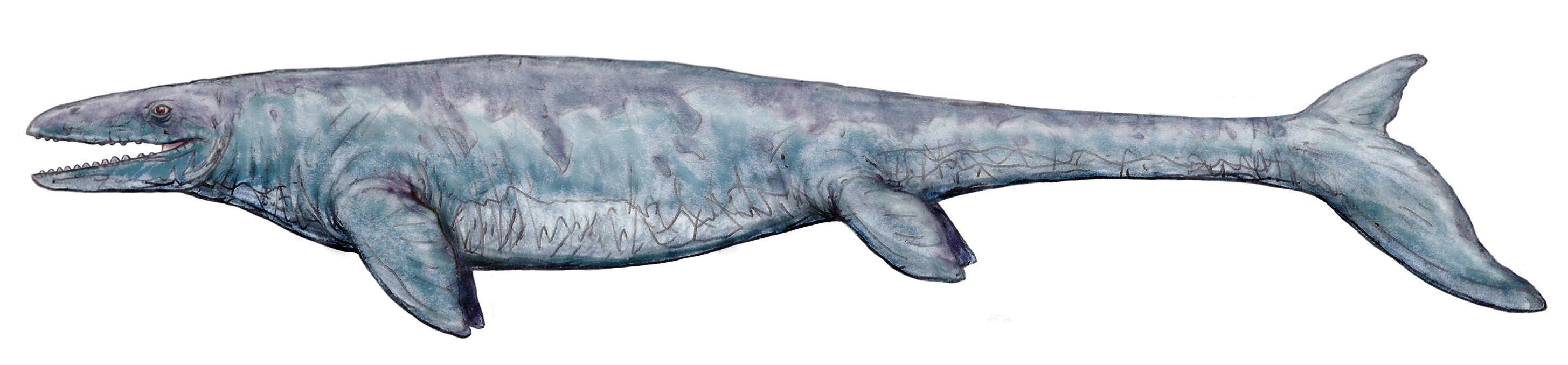
- Life restoration

Scientific classification
- Kingdom: Animalia
- Phylum: Chordata
- Class: Reptilia
- Order: Squamata
- Clade: †Mosasauria
- Family: †Mosasauridae
- Tribe: †Globidensini
- Genus: †Igdamanosaurus; Lingham-Soliar, 1991

Type species
- Igdamanosaurus aegyptiacus (Zdansky, 1935)

Synonyms
- Globidens aegyptiacus Zdansky, 1935

= Igdamanosaurus =

Igdamanosaurus Temporal range: Late Cretaceous, Maastrichtian, 70.6–66 Ma

Extinct genus of lizards

Igdamanosaurus, meaning "lizard from Igdaman", is an extinct genus of Cretaceous marine lizard belonging to the mosasaur family. It is classified as part of the Globidensini tribe (within the Mosasaurinae), and is like the other members of the tribe recognised by its rounded and knob-like teeth. These teeth indicate a highly specialized lifestyle, likely including a durophagous diet.

The genus contains a single species, Igdamanosaurus aegyptiacus, from Maastrichtian-aged marine environments of Africa. Its fragmentary fossil remains have been recovered from the Duwi Formation of Egypt and the Dukamaje Formation of Niger.

== Description ==
Igdamanosaurus was a small durophagous mosasaur at a size roughly similar to the closely related globidensin Carinodens. Its fossils preserve blunt, rounded teeth similar to those of the other members of the Globidensini. These teeth were better suited for crushing armored prey like molluscs and turtles, rather than fish or other reptiles normally preyed on by other mosasaurs.

The type specimen, BMNH R11898, is fragmentary and consists of three poorly preserved jaw fragments, two almost complete finely striated teeth, three tooth bases and fragments from at least five broken teeth. Though it is difficult to tell, these remains likely come from the same individual.

The dentary is noted as being of massive proportions, similar to the massive and robust dentaries found in Globidens and Prognathodon. A medially located shallow recess on the dentary indicates the groove for the splenial.

=== Dentition ===
The type specimen preserves seven teeth in various degrees of preservation which increase in size in an anteroposterior direction, except for the last tooth which is slightly smaller than the penultimate of the preserved teeth. The teeth are straight, broad cones with rounded and domed tips. In cross-section the teeth are subcircular. Tooth crowns possess unwaisted bases and are covered in fine parallel ribbing or striae, numbering at approximately 65 to 70 per tooth. The teeth are more or less uniform across the dentary and the largest one measures approximately 27 mm high and 22 mm wide.

== Classification ==
Originally named as Globidens aegyptiacus by Otto Zdansky (1935), the species was first recognised as sufficiently distinct to be separated into its own genus by Lingham-Soliar (1991), who named it Igdamanosaurus after the village of Igdaman (sometimes called In Dama), which was near to where the type specimen was found.

Though undoubtedly similar to Globidens in its dental adaptations and similar to G. alabamaensis in possessing unusually small foramina for exits of the mandibular nerve on the lower lateral surface of the dentary, Lingham-Soliar (1991) noted that the vertical striae present in Igdamanosaurus would suggest that it represented a completely new type of durophagous mosasaur that was derived from a Platecarpus-like ancestor rather than a Clidastes-like one and thus classified it as part of the Plioplatecarpinae.

The latest analyses all place Igdamanosaurus within the Mosasaurinae however, within the Globidensini tribe as a close relative of Carinodens and Globidens, or even an indeterminate species of Globidens.
