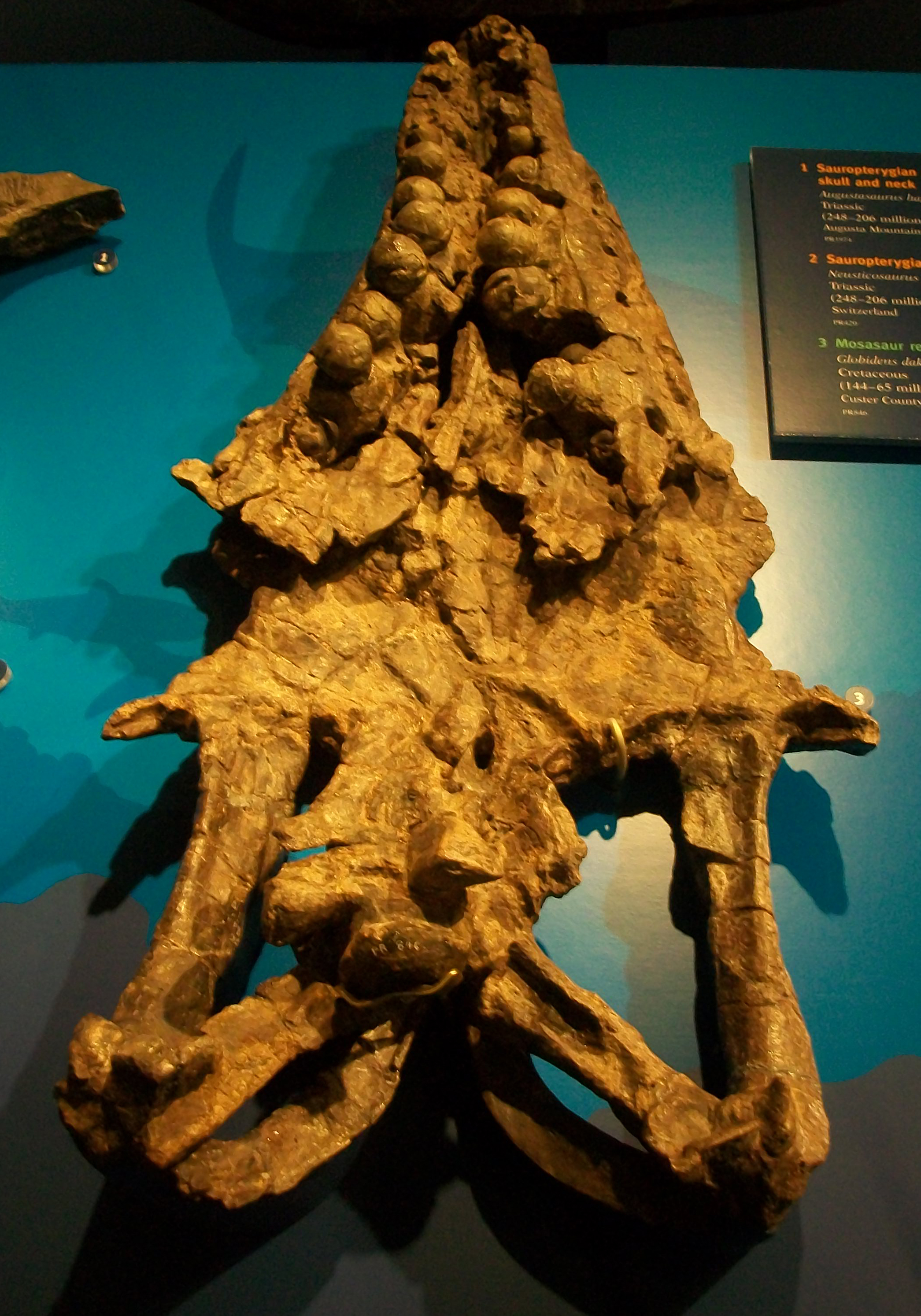
- Skull of G. dakotensis (bottom view) in the Field Museum of Natural History, Chicago

Scientific classification
- Kingdom: Animalia
- Phylum: Chordata
- Class: Reptilia
- Order: Squamata
- Clade: †Mosasauria
- Family: †Mosasauridae
- Subfamily: †Mosasaurinae
- Tribe: †Globidensini

Genera
- †Carinodens?; †Globidens; †Harranasaurus; †Igdamanosaurus; †Xenodens?

= Globidensini =

Globidensini Temporal range: Late Cretaceous

Tribe of lizards

The Globidensini or Globidentatini are a tribe of mosasaurine mosasaurs, a diverse group of Late Cretaceous marine squamates. Members of the tribe, known as "globidensins" or "globidensine mosasaurs", have been recovered from North America, Europe, Africa and Asia. The tribe contains the genera Globidens (the best studied genus by far), Carinodens, Igdamanosaurus, Harranasaurus and Xenodens. Features of the maxilla and digits make the placement of Carinodens and Xenodens in the tribe uncertain; some researchers have suggested that they may be more appropriately placed in the Mosasaurini.

Towards the end of the Cretaceous, a series of adaptations allowed the highly specialized mosasaurs within the Globidensini, characterized by knob-like teeth, to successfully reclaim the niche of the durophagous lifestyle. This niche had been unoccupied for most of the Mesozoic ever since the extinction of the placodonts and the durophagous ichthyosaur Grippia. The rarity of the Globidensini in the fossil record remains a mystery, perhaps it is due to habitat preference (deep water), some other form of taphonomic bias or due to the durophagous lifestyle not allowing the establishment of large populations in the first place. In Angola, the disappearance coincides with the extinction of Inoceramus shells.

The robust and globular teeth have on occasion been compared to the genera Prognathodon and Plesiotylosaurus, both of which sometimes are included within the tribe. Said genera are probably not as closely connected to Globidens as such an inclusion would suggest.

The etymology of the tribe derives from the genus Globidens (Latin Globus = "globe" + Latin dens = "teeth").

== Description ==
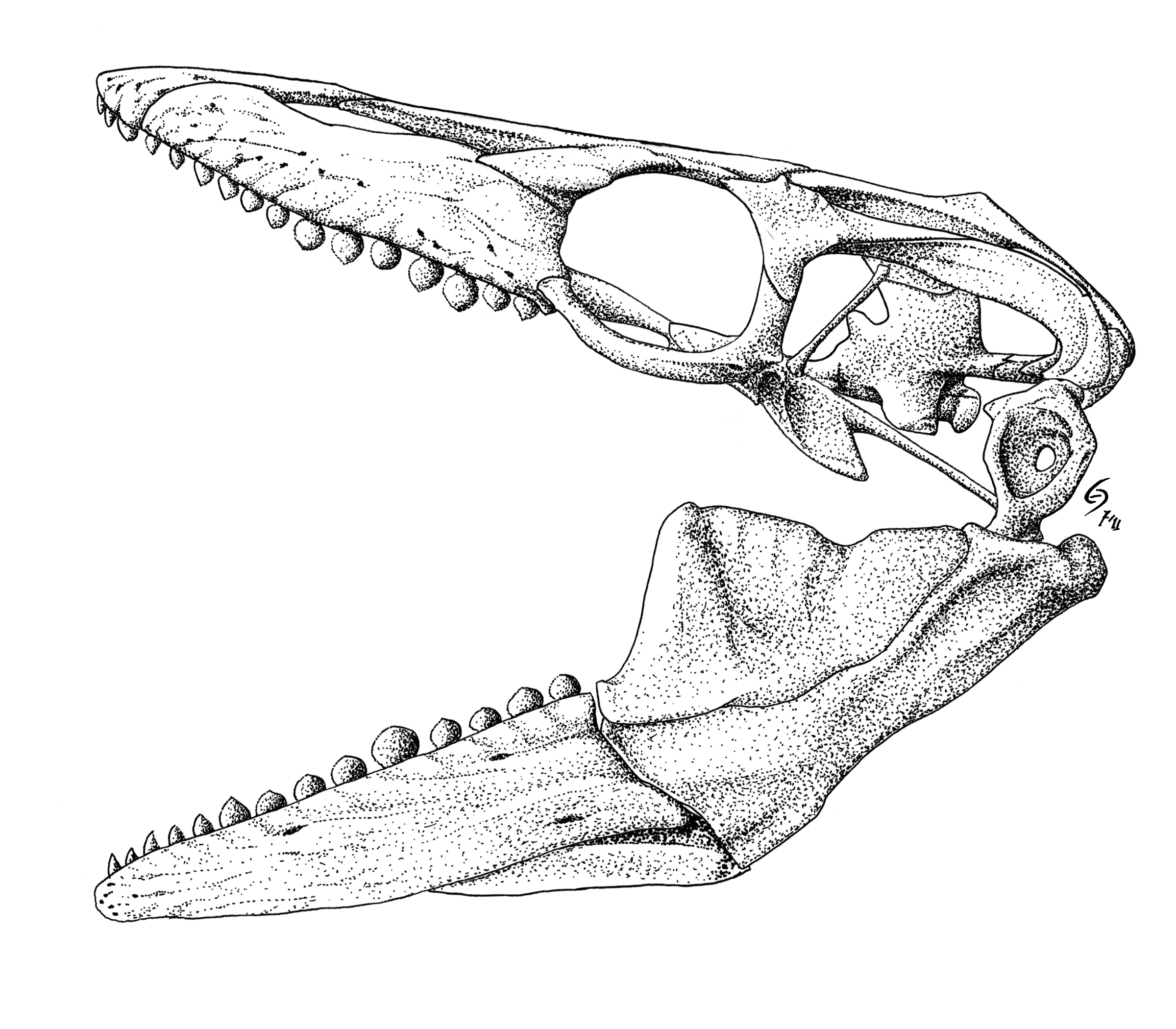
Reconstructed skull of Globidens dakotensis, showing the distinctive globular teeth.

Overall, globidensins were medium-sized mosasaurs, with Globidens itself reaching about 6 meters in length. The teeth of Globidens, Carinodens and Igdamanosaurus differ from those of all other mosasaurs in being very robust and globular. Most mosasaur genera have sharp teeth adapted to grab soft and slippery prey like fish and cephalopods. Though some clearly were capable of crushing through the shells of armored prey, none were as specialized as Globidens and its kin, which combined robust and powerful skulls with semispherical teeth capable of crushing through the shells of animals like ammonites, bivalves and small turtles.

Russell (1967) did not offer a proper diagnosis for the tribe when he named it, due to how poorly known the osteology of Globidens was at the time, but nevertheless erected a new tribe due to the clearly distinct features separating Globidens from the rest of the Mosasaurinae and considered Globidens to be a derived descendant of Clidastes.

A more recently suggested definition is a branch-based definition diagnosing the Globidensini as the most inclusive clade containing Globidens dakotensis but not Mosasaurus hoffmannii.

=== Jaw mechanics ===
Both the genera Globidens and Prognathodon (sometimes classified as a globidensin, though most often not) have adaptations to a powerful jaw musculature. The ratio between the length of the supratemporal fenestra and the total length of the skull has previously been used as an improvised measurement for mosasaur bite force, and is quite high in these genera (0.27 in Globidens dakotensis and 0.22 in Prognathodon overtoni and P. saturator) compared to other mosasaurs like Mosasaurus hoffmannii (with a ratio of 0.19).

== Species and taxonomy ==
Globidensini

- Carinodens
  - C. acrodon
  - C. fraasi
  - C. belgicus
  - C. minalmamar
  - C. palistinicus
- Globidens
  - G. alabamaensis
  - G. dakotensis
  - G. hisaensis
  - G. phosphaticus
  - G. schurmanni
  - G. simplex
- Harranasaurus
  - H. khuludae
- Igdamanosaurus
  - I. aegyptiacus
