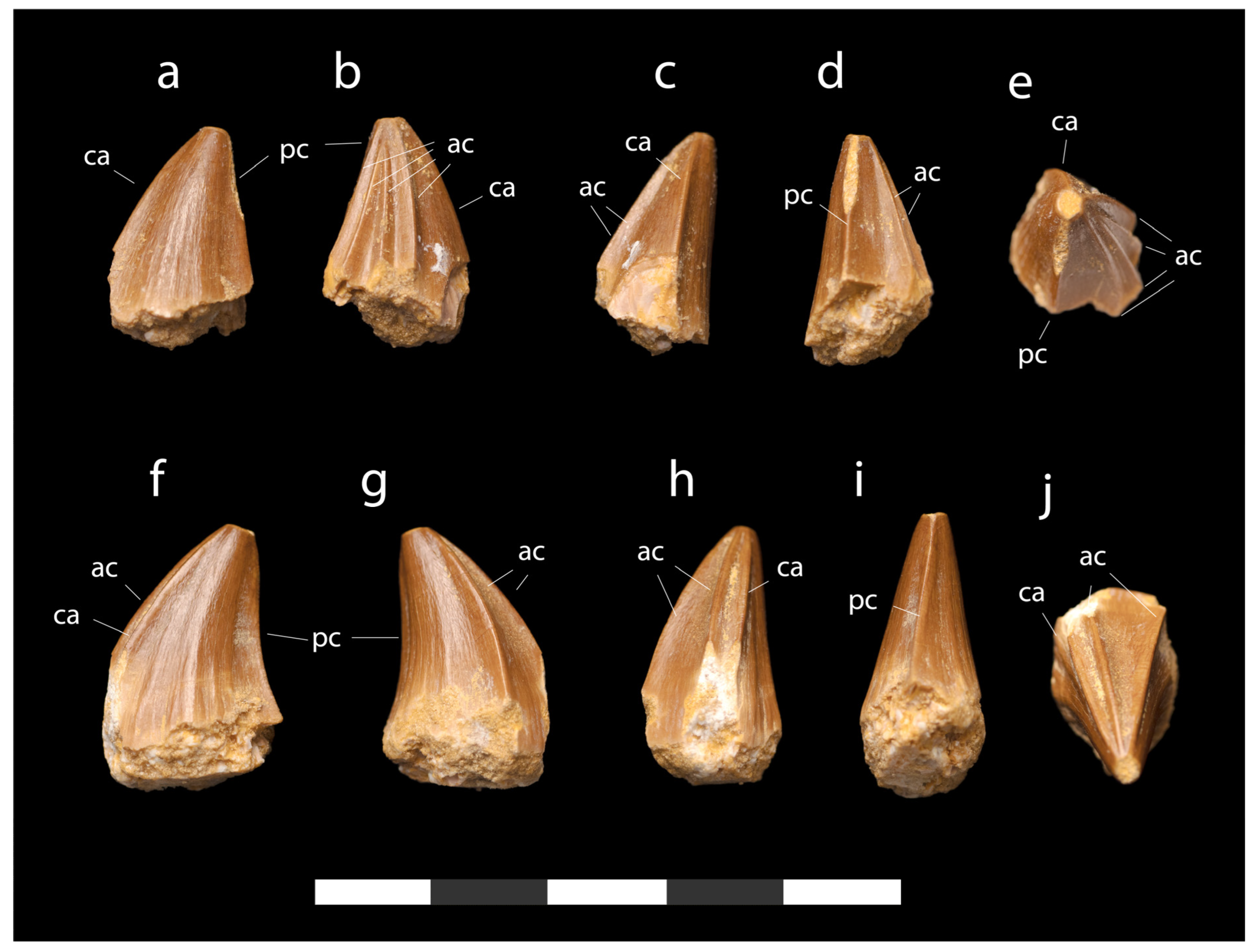
- Holotype teeth

Scientific classification
- Kingdom: Animalia
- Phylum: Chordata
- Class: Reptilia
- Order: Squamata
- Clade: †Mosasauria
- Family: †Mosasauridae
- Subfamily: †Mosasaurinae
- Genus: †Stelladens; Longrich et al., 2023
- Species: †S. mysteriosus

Binomial name
- †Stelladens mysteriosus Longrich et al., 2023

= Stelladens =

Stelladens Temporal range: Late Cretaceous, Maastrichtian

Extinct genus of mosasaurine

Stelladens (meaning "star tooth") is an extinct genus of mosasaurine mosasaurs from the Late Cretaceous Ouled Abdoun Basin of Morocco. The genus contains a single species, S. mysteriosus.

== Discovery and naming ==
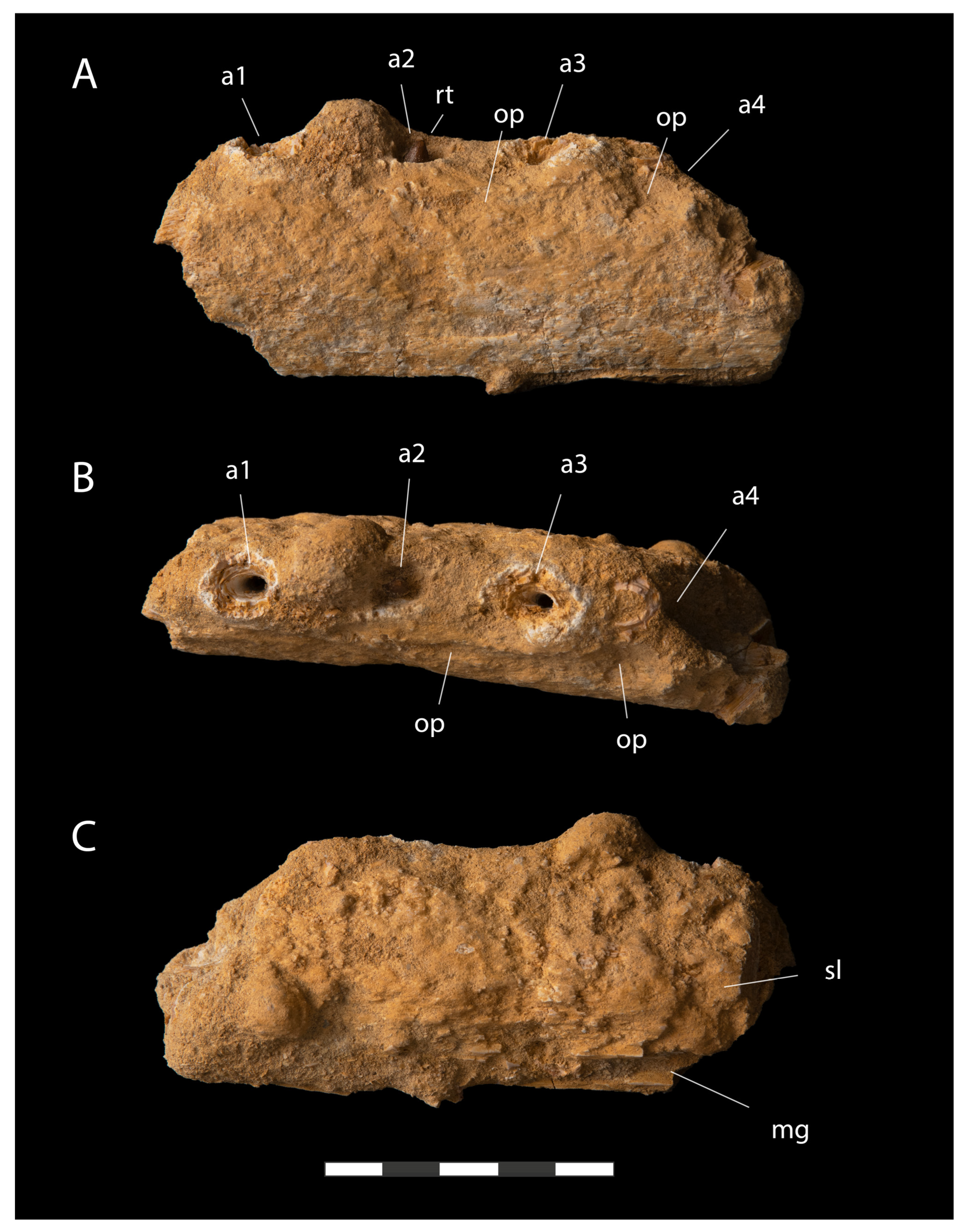
Holotype dentary

The Stelladens holotype specimen, MHNM.KHG.1436, was discovered in the Sidi Chennane phosphate mine (Lower Couche III) of Oulad Abdoun Basin in Khouribga Province, Morocco. The specimen consists of a partial left dentary and two associated teeth, which is estimated to belong to an individual around 5 metres (16 ft) in total body length.

In 2024, Longrich et al. described Stelladens mysteriosus as a new genus and species of mosasaurs based on these fossil remains. The generic name, Stelladens, combines the Latin words stella, meaning "star" and dens, meaning "tooth", in reference to the shape of the teeth. The specific name, mysteriosus, derives from the Latin mysterium, meaning "mystery", referencing the unusual tooth morphology.

Undescribed teeth potentially referable to Stelladens have also been reported from the younger Upper Couche III in the Sidi Chennane locality.

In 2024, Sharpe et al. argued that tooth-based holotypes such as those of Xenodens and most species of Carinodens generally lack sufficient character and variation data to be properly diagnostic, and included the study which described Stelladens as an example of undiagnostic holotypes.
