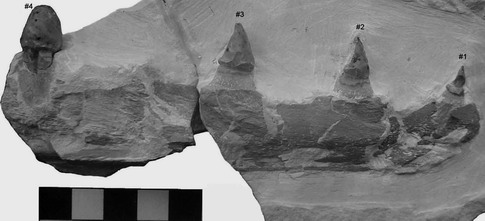
- Holotype mandible

Scientific classification
- Kingdom: Animalia
- Phylum: Chordata
- Class: Reptilia
- Order: Squamata
- Clade: †Mosasauria
- Family: †Mosasauridae
- Subfamily: †Mosasaurinae
- Tribe: †Globidensini
- Genus: †Harranasaurus; Kaddumi, 2009
- Species: †H. khuludae

Binomial name
- †Harranasaurus khuludae Kaddumi, 2009

= Harranasaurus =

Harranasaurus Temporal range: Late Maastrichtian

Extinct genus of lizards

Harranasaurus (meaning "Harrana lizard") is an extinct genus of globidensin mosasaur from Jordan. The genus contains one known species, H. khuludae from the Muwaqqar Chalk Marl Formation of Jordan.
