= Polunino =

Polunino Полунино
- Khutor
- Location within Volgograd Oblast Location within Russia
- Coordinates: 49°38′N 44°54′E
- Country: Russia
- Region: Volgograd Oblast
- District: Dubovsky District
- Time zone: UTC+4:00

Polunino (Russian: Полунино) is a rural locality (a khutor) in Gornobalykleyskoye Rural Settlement, Dubovsky District, Volgograd Oblast, Russia. The population was 150 as of 2010. There are 3 streets.

== Geography ==
Polunino is located in steppe, on the right bank of the Kholostaya River, 75 km north of Dubovka (the district's administrative centre) by road. Lipovka is the nearest rural locality.
