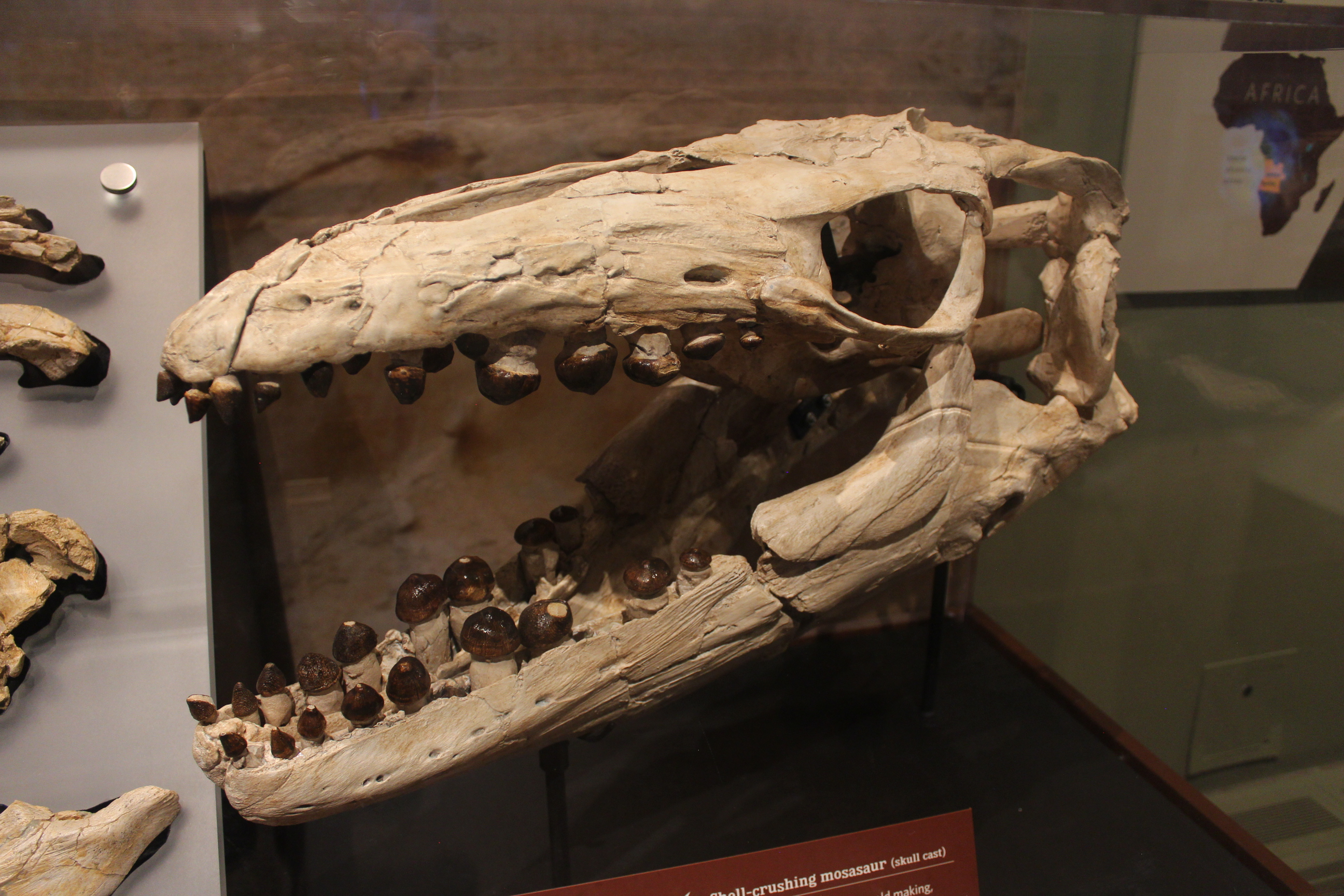
- Reconstructed skull of G. phosphaticus, National Museum of Natural History

Scientific classification
- Kingdom: Animalia
- Phylum: Chordata
- Class: Reptilia
- Order: Squamata
- Clade: †Mosasauria
- Family: †Mosasauridae
- Tribe: †Globidensini
- Genus: †Globidens; Gilmore, 1912

Species
- G. alabamaensis (Type) Gilmore, 1912; G. dakotensis Russell, 1975; G. hisaensis Kaddumi, 2009; G. phosphaticus Bardet and Pereda-Suberbiola, 2005; G. schurmanni Martin, 2007; G. simplex LeBlanc et al., 2019

= Globidens =

Globidens Temporal range: Late Cretaceous, 84.9–66 Ma

Extinct genus of lizards

Globidens ("Globe tooth") is an extinct genus of mosasaurid oceanic lizard classified as part of the Globidensini tribe in the Mosasaurinae subfamily. Globidens belongs to the family Mosasauridae, which consists of several genera of predatory marine lizards of various sizes that were prevalent during the Late Cretaceous. Specimens of Globidens have been discovered in Angola, Brazil, Colombia, Morocco, Syria and the United States. Among mosasaurs, Globidens is probably most well known for the highly rounded, globe-like teeth that give it its name.

Globidens alabamaensis was the first species of Globidens described, in a publication by Charles W. Gilmore (1912). It is used as the type specimen for Globidens.

== Description ==
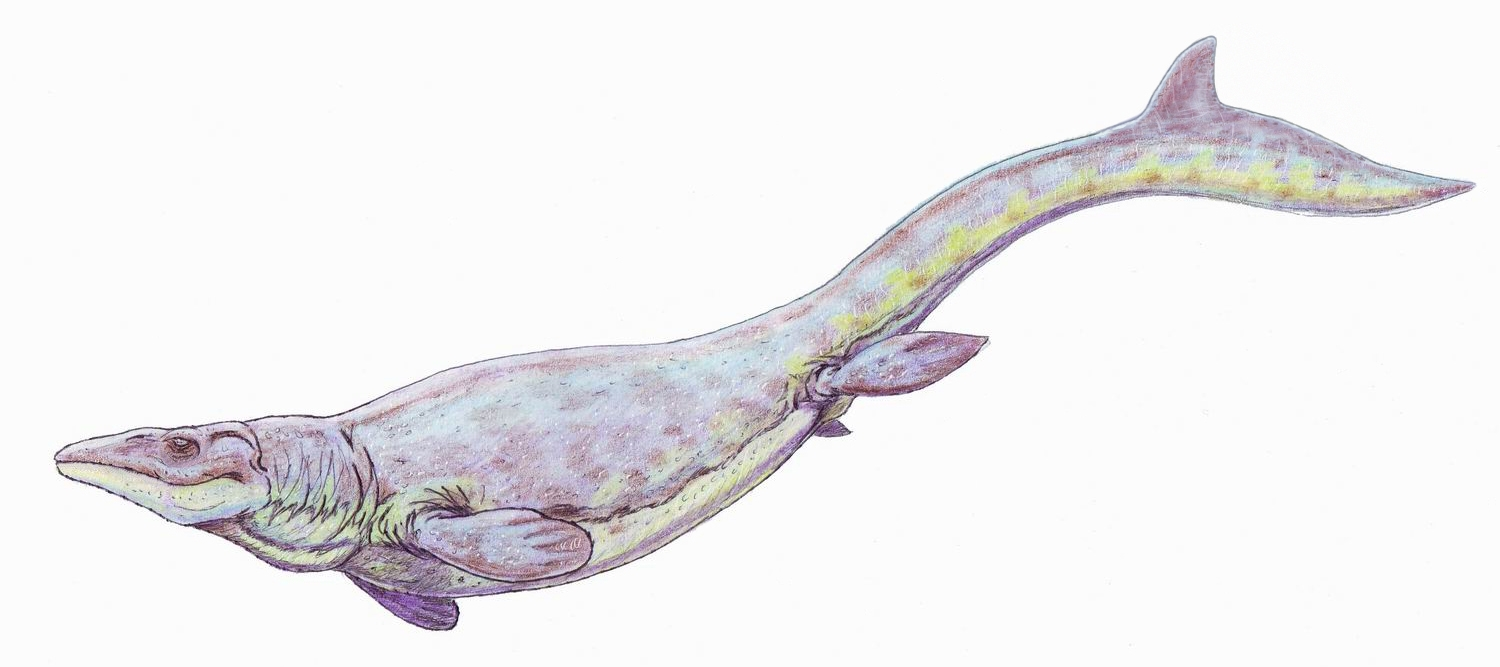
Life restoration of G. alabamaensis

Globidens was a relatively medium-sized mosasaur, measuring about 5–6 metres (16–20 ft) long. It was similar in appearance to other mosasaurs, with its streamlined body, flippers, a laterally flattened tail, and powerful jaws. The teeth of Globidens differed from those of other mosasaurs in being rounded or “globular”, giving rise to its generic name. Most mosasaurs had sharp teeth evolved to grab soft, slippery prey like fish, squid, plesiosaurs, and other mosasaurs. In some later mosasaur species, their teeth were modified to rend flesh as well. While many other mosasaurs were capable of crushing the shells of ammonites or turtles, none were as specialized for dealing with armored prey as Globidens. Globidens had semispherical teeth with rounded points suited for crushing tough, armored prey, including turtles, ammonites, nautili, and bivalves. Like its larger relative, Mosasaurus, Globidens had a robustly built skull with tightly-articulating jaws and a strong bite that played a large role in the animal’s ability to penetrate the armor of its shelled prey.

Gilmore's initial assessment of Globidens, based on an incomplete specimen of G. alabamaensis, made note of characteristics observable in parts of the skull, the teeth, and one of the cervical vertebrae. He made note of a long snout with a large maxilla, a large, sturdy frontal bone, and the characteristic globular teeth with finely wrinkled enamel. Gilmore concluded that the skull characters were similar to Platecarpus or, more closely, to Brachysaurus (which is currently Prognathodon).

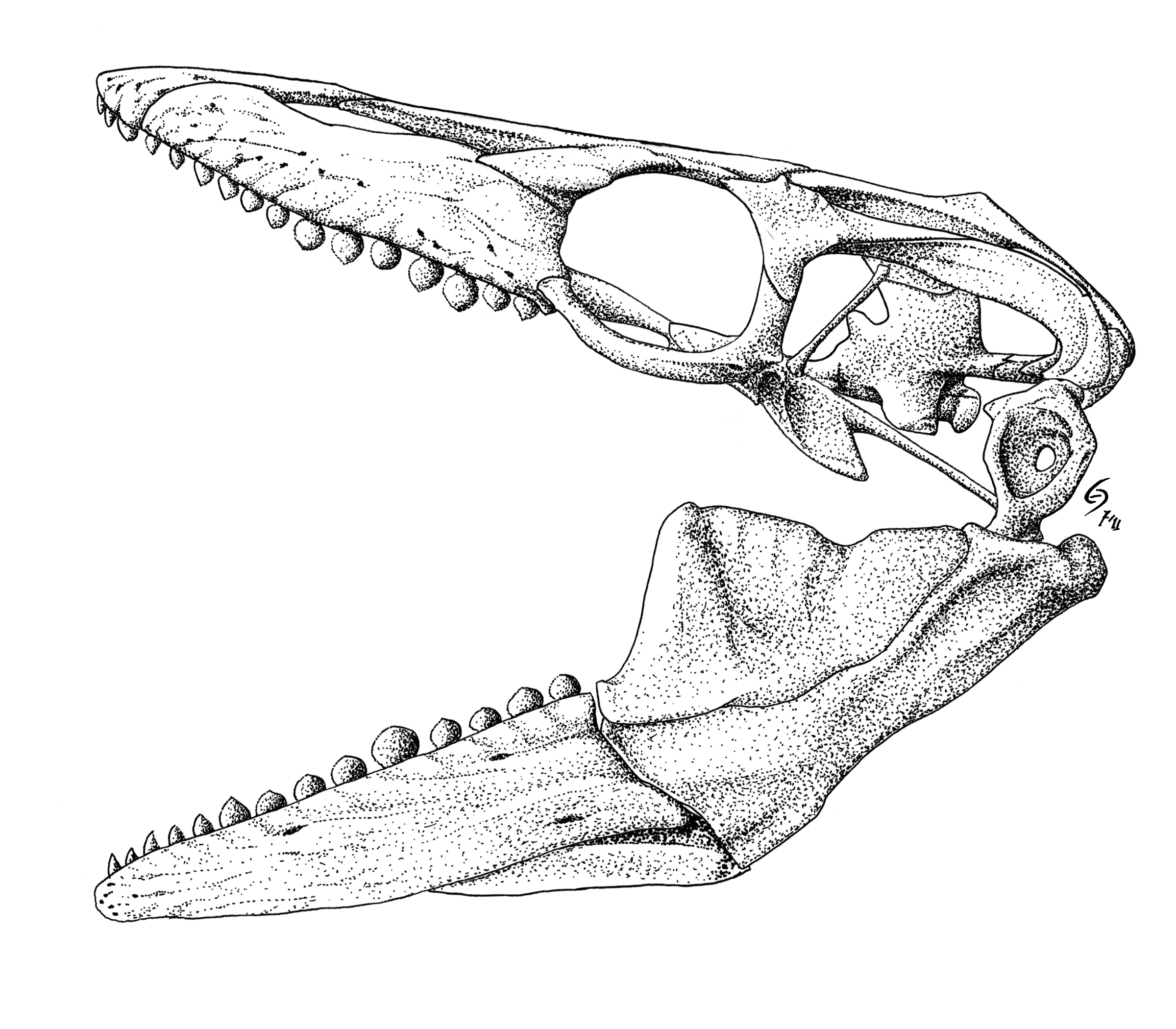
Reconstructed skull of G. dakotensis

Studies since Gilmore's assessment establish more specific and more complete lists of diagnostic features. Gilmore correctly inferred that Globidens had a stout, powerfully built skull. In addition, a few of its notable skull characteristics include a small parietal foramen located entirely within the parietal, tuberosities present on the jugal, a longitudinal crest present on the dorsal surface of the frontal, and a premaxilla with a rostrum anterior to the premaxillary teeth. The rounded teeth with finely wrinkled enamel seen in Globidens are characteristic of Globidensini. However, the degree of rounding on individual teeth may be indicative of genus or even species. Marginal teeth in Globidens become most subspherical toward the center of the jaws. Additionally, Globidens had thirteen maxillary teeth and either lacked or showed only rudimentary pterygoid teeth on the roof of its mouth.

== History of discovery ==
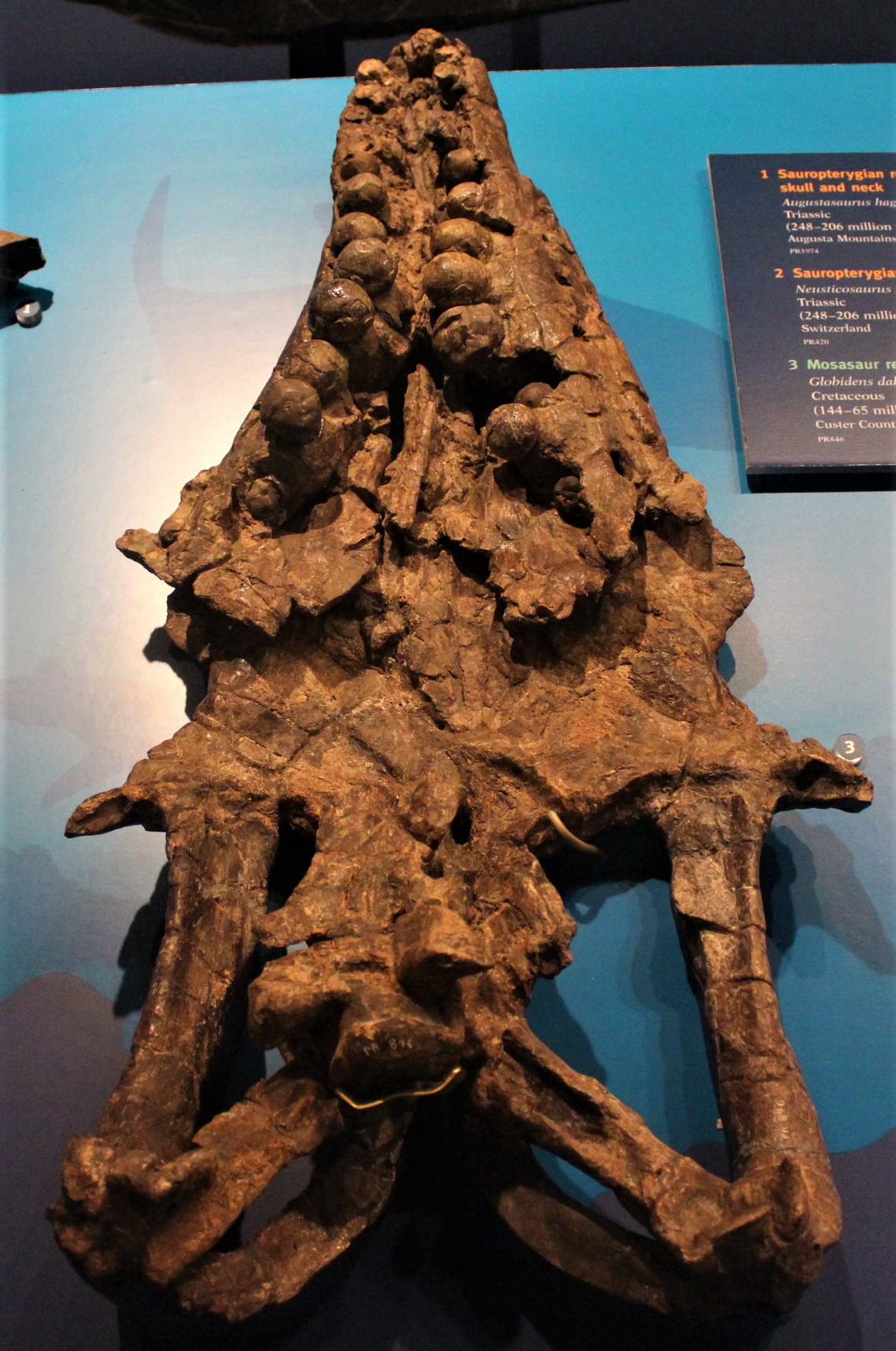
Skull of G. dakotensis (bottom view), Field Museum of Natural History

Globidens was first described in 1912 by Charles W. Gilmore. Using an incomplete specimen made of only of a partial skull with several teeth, a single cervical vertebra, and numerous fragments, Gilmore identified Globidens as a new genus and named his type specimen Globidens alabamaensis. The genus name was based on the globular structure of the specimen's teeth and the species name on the location in which it was discovered: Alabama. However, it may be noted that the original location from which the specimen was taken is not precisely known, as Gilmore was examining a specimen that had been collected earlier.

Since Gilmore's identification of Globidens, several other species have been identified, including G. dakotensis (Russell 1975), which is sometimes used as a secondary type specimen alongside G. alabamaensis. Some specimens previously thought to be new species of Globidens have since been reassigned to other taxa, such as Prognathodon, or placed in a new taxa, such as G. aegypticus, which is now a type specimen for Igdamanosaurus.

=== Species ===
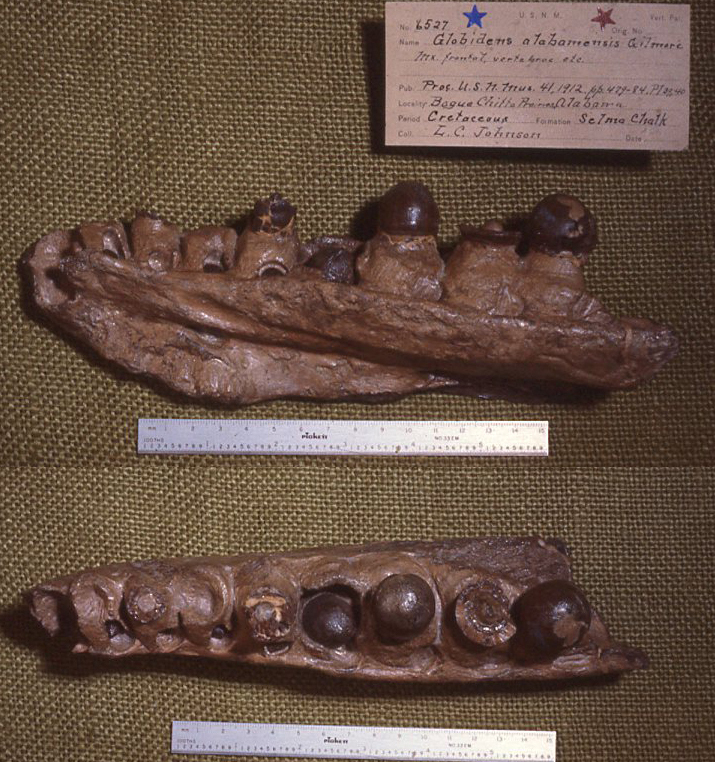
Holotype maxilla (USNM 6527.jpg) of G. alabamaensis

- Globidens alabamaensis Gilmore, 1912 - (Generic type) The height of the tooth crown is less than the greatest tooth crown diameter behind the seventh maxillary tooth. The crown length is greater than the crown width in front of the tenth maxillary tooth. The maxilla is long and the frontal is narrow. The frontal bone slightly enters the orbits dorsally.
- G. dakotaensis Russell, 1975 - The height of the tooth crown is less than the greatest tooth crown diameter behind the fourth maxillary tooth. The crown length is greater than the crown width in front of the tenth maxillary tooth. The maxilla is long and the frontal is broad. The frontal bone does not enter the orbits dorsally.
- G. phosphaticus Bardet et al. 2005 from Morocco and Angola.
- G. schurmanni Martin, 2007.
- G. hisaensis Kaddumi, 2009 from central Jordan.
- G. simplex LeBlanc et al. 2019 from Morocco. A complete mandible and partial skull was recovered, showing large jaw adductor musculature attachment points indicative of hard shelled prey. A shortened dentary with respect to the Posterior Mandibular Unit relative to other globidensine mosasaurs supports this as well. Postcranial remains were also recovered and histological analysis of one rib showed increased bone compactness reminiscent of conditions seen in early stages of marine tetrapod evolution, suggesting increased ability to stay submerged for long periods along the sea floor.

==== Reassigned species ====
- Globidens aegyptiacus Zdansky, 1935; now type species of Igdamanosaurus.
- Globidens fraasi Dollo 1913; now type species of Carinodens.
- Globidens timorensis Huene, 1935; reinterpreted as a Triassic ichthyosaur
- Globidens belgicus (Woodward, 1891) Kruytzer, 1961; reinterpreted as a species of Carinodens.

== Classification ==
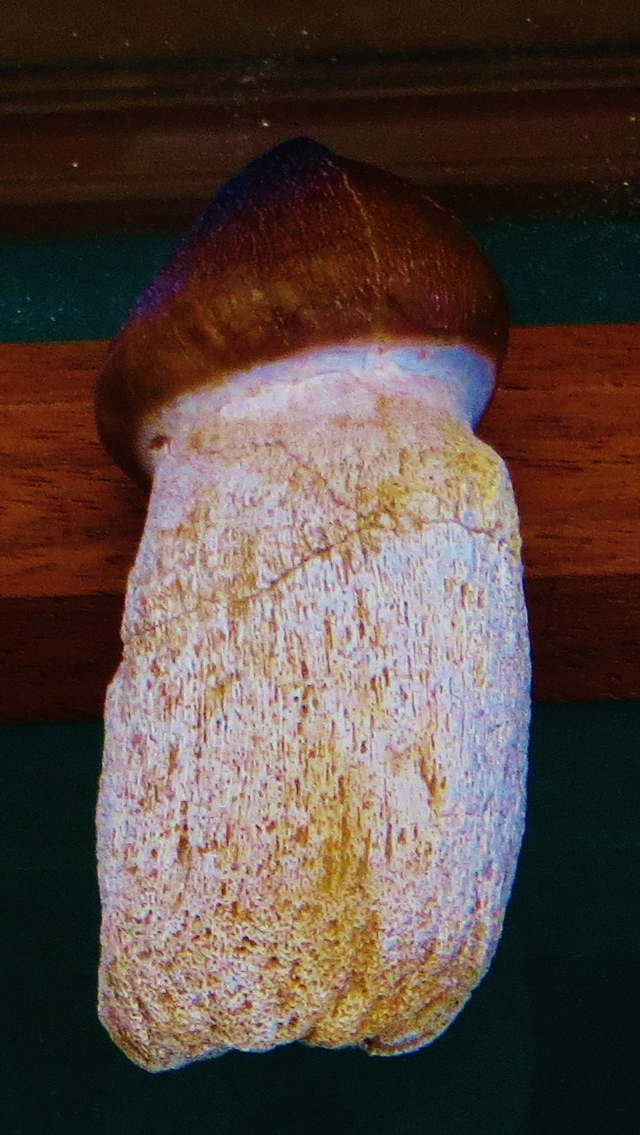
G. phosphaticus tooth

Globidens resides within the subfamily Mosasaurinae, which includes several mosasaur lineages, and within that, the Tribe Globidensini, which also includes the genus Carinodens. Carinodens is thus regarded as a sister taxon of Globidens.

Placement of Globidens and, to an extent, Mosasauridae in a phylogenetic tree is somewhat unclear and specific placement of genera varies between many morphological and molecular tests. It is generally agreed that Mosasauridae is a sister group to Pythonomorpha, which includes all snakes. Within Mosasauridae, Globidens is generally placed near Prognathodon, although some placements of Prognathodon specimens are questionable.

Below is a cladogram of mosasaurs and related taxa modified from Aaron R. H. Leblanc, Michael W. Caldwell and Nathalie Bardet, 2012:

- Mosasaurinae
  - Dallasaurus turneri
  - - - Clidastes liodontus
      - Clidastes moorevillensis
      - Clidastes propython
    - - "Prognathodon" kianda
      - - Globidens alabamaensis
        - Globidens dakotensis
        - - Mosasaurini
            - Eremiasaurus heterodontus
            - - Plotosaurus bennisoni
              - - Mosasaurus conodon
                - Mosasaurus hoffmanni
                - Mosasaurus missouriensis
          - - "Prognathodon" rapax
            - - Plesiotylosaurus crassidens
              - - Prognathodon overtoni
                - - Prognathodon saturator
                  - - Prognathodon waiparaensis
                    - - Prognathodon solvayi
                      - Prognathodon currii

== Paleobiology ==
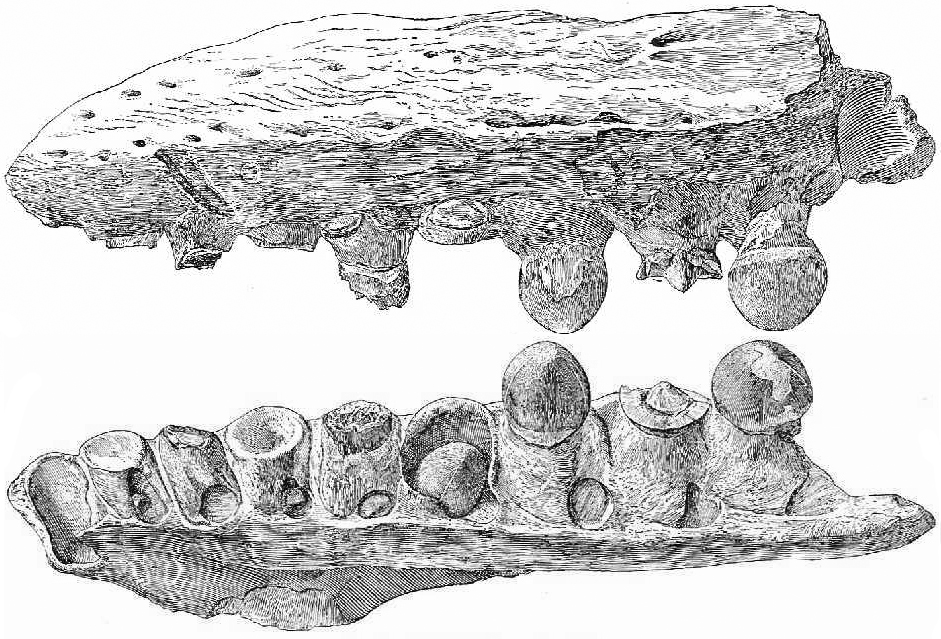
Lateral and oblique, medial view of the left maxilla of G. alabamaensis

Globidens was uniquely adapted to take advantage of hard-shelled prey in comparison to other mosasaurs. In addition to a generally robust skull, its teeth are adapted for crushing rather than piercing or tearing. It is believed that Globidens was a durophagous predator, eating hard-shelled mollusks such as bivalves and ammonites. Stomach contents of a specimen found in South Dakota support prior assumptions, showing the crushed shells of inoceramid clams.

== Paleoecology ==
Globidens, like other mosasaurs, lived in the warm, shallow seas of the Late Cretaceous, such as the Western Interior Seaway of North America. So far, Globidens has been discovered primarily in North America and in parts of northern and western Africa, such as Morocco and Angola, although specimens from the Middle East and eastern South America have been found as well.

== See also ==
- List of marine reptiles
