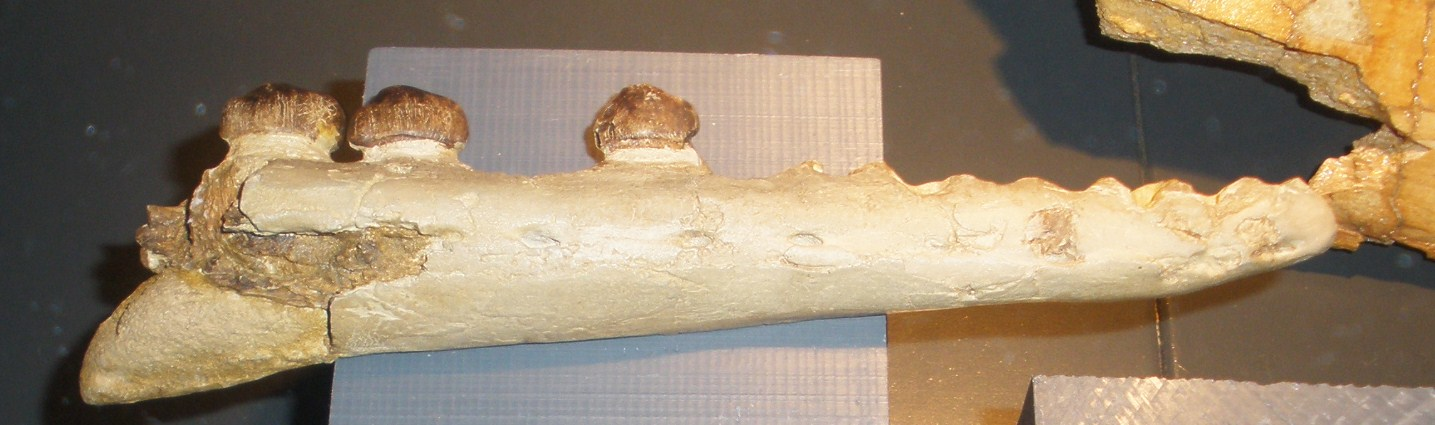
- Jaw of Carinodens belgicus

Scientific classification
- Kingdom: Animalia
- Phylum: Chordata
- Class: Reptilia
- Order: Squamata
- Clade: †Mosasauria
- Family: †Mosasauridae
- Tribe: †Globidensini
- Genus: †Carinodens; Thurmond, 1969

Species
- C. fraasi (Dollo, 1913) (type); C. acrodon Longrich et al., 2024; C. belgicus (Woodward, 1891); C. minalmamar Schulp, Bardet & Bouya, 2009; C. palistinicus Kaddumi, 2009

Synonyms
- Compressidens (Dollo, 1924, preoccupied); Globidens fraasi (Dollo, 1913); Bottosaurus belgicus (Woodward, 1891)

= Carinodens =

Carinodens Temporal range: Late Cretaceous, Maastrichtian 70.6–66 Ma

Extinct genus of lizards

Carinodens is an extinct genus of Cretaceous marine lizard belonging to the mosasaur family. "Carinodens" means "keel teeth" and was named in 1969 as a replacement name for Compressidens, "compressed teeth", which was already in use for a gadilidan scaphopod mollusk.

Carinodens is widely considered a sister taxon to Globidens classified within the tribe Globidensini. Like its close relative, Carinodens also possesses distinctive round, blunt teeth for crushing primitive clams and oysters. Most of the cranial elements known from the genus have been recovered from deposits in the Netherlands and Belgium, with the only known postcranial material being known from deposits of latest Maastrichtian age in Jordan. Other materials have been discovered in Europe, North America, South America and North Africa.

== Description ==
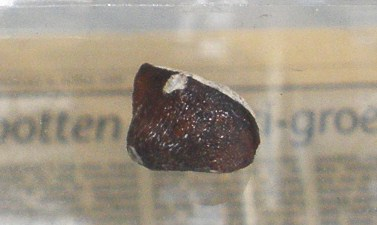
Tooth of C. belgicus.

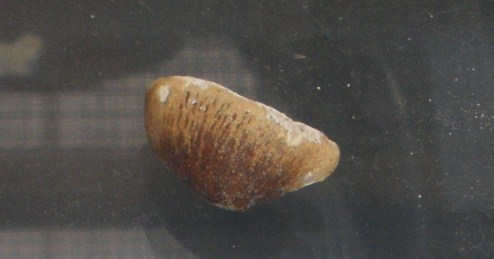
Tooth of C. fraasi.

Carinodens measured about 2–2.6 metres (6.6–8.5 ft) in length and is one of the smallest known mosasaurs. It was closely related to Globidens, though is scantly known in comparison. The holotype specimen consists of an incomplete right dentary and most subsequently referred fossils are isolated teeth. The holotype dentary only preserves the posteriormost teeth, meaning that until recently when more comprehensive material was recovered, most of the dentition of the genus (its most distinctive feature) was unknown.

Carinodens can easily be distinguished from the closely related Globidens by the compressed nature of its teeth and its relatively delicate dentary.

Russell (1967) offered a brief diagnosis (due to the fragmentary nature of the fossils) of the genus, then known as Compressidens: "Small projection of dentary anterior to first dentary tooth. Median dentary teeth bilaterally compressed, bicarinate, subrectangular in lateral view and with pointed apices. Anterior teeth circular in cross-section with strongly recurved pointed apices".

=== Dentition ===
By mosasaur standards, the teeth of Carinodens are unusually heterodont, both in morphology and size. The alveoli show a marked size decrease between teeth #8 and #7, and the teeth themselves change dramatically in both size and morphology between #8 and #7. This is similar to the maxillary teeth of Globidens dakotensis (between positions #5 and #6, though this is less pronounced than in Carinodens) and in Globidens alabamaensis.

== Diet ==
Carinodens, like the related Globidens, is considered to have been a durophagous mosasaur. Because the anteriormost part of the dentary of Carinodens is relatively slender with small pointed tooth crowns, only the posteriormost five teeth actually functioned for crushing food. The anteriormost portion of the dentary was thus likely used for acquiring and handling food rather than crushing it, an idea already suggested by Dollo (1913) during the description of the type species. The maxilla of Carinodens is unknown, which hinders knowledge on the interaction between the lower and upper jaw.

Dollo (1913, 1924) suggested a diet dominated by echinoderms, whereas Lingham-Soliar (1990, 1999) listed a wide array of potential prey items, including belemnites, nautilids, bivalves, gastropods, scaphopods, brachiopods, echinoderms and arthropods. These groups were abundant in the late Cretaceous seas around Maastricht, meaning that their population numbers cannot explain the rarity of Carinodens. It is possible that Carinodens spent most of its life in deep waters, only rarely swimming in shallow seas. Dental wear evidence strongly suggests that C. belgicus ate hard-shelled benthic invertebrates.

== Classification ==
Carinodens fraasi was first described and illustrated by Louis Dollo in 1913 as "Globidens fraasi". Dollo later erected a separate genus, "Compressidens" for the species in 1924, recognising the more compressed nature of the teeth in comparison to those of Globidens. Dollo also assigned Bottosaurus belgicus, previously misinterpreted as a species of crocodilian, to the genus as Compressidens belgicus. With the name Compressidens being preoccupied by a scaphopod mollusk, Thurmond (1969) proposed the substitute name Carinodens.

Carinodens is most frequently recovered as a sister taxon to Globidens within the Globidensini tribe in the Mosasaurinae. The cladogram below, covering the Globidensini, is based upon a summary of evolutionary adaptations in the Globidensini featured in Schulp et al. (2004), who saw C. belgicus as being identical to C. fraasi and having priority:

- Globidensini
  - Prognathodon
  - - Globidens
    - Carinodens

The primary feature distinguishing the two recognised species, C. fraasi and C. belgicus is found in their dentition. The teeth of C. fraasi are unicuspid and the teeth of C. belgicus are tricuspid. Carinodens fossils from Jordan, consisting of an almost complete skull with at least 24 teeth still occupying their natural locations, a complete neck vertebral series as well as several back vertebrae, and front paddles were reported by Kaddumi (2009). In addition to the dentary, maxillary, and premaxillary teeth, several small pterygoid teeth were also recovered from the same specimen. Kaddumi (2009) fully described the remains and referred them to a new species of Carinodens, C. palistinicus. Based on the remarkable dental heterodonty exhibited in C. palistinicus, several previously not considered prey items may be postulated for Carinodens (Kaddumi 2009).

Sharpe et al. (2024) found that the holotype of Xenodens could not differentiate that genus from being an earlier ontogenetic stage of the Carinodens dental morph. They also argued that the limited diagnostic potential of mosasaur teeth should render taxa diagnosed strictly based on teeth nomina dubia, such as most species of Carinodens, with the possible exception of C. palistinicus which is known from a relatively complete cranial material and partial postcranial material. In their rebuttal for the validity of Xenodens, Longrich et al. (2025) performed CT scans and suggested that the maxilla and associated dentition of C. acrodon differ significantly from those of Xenodens, indicating that it would require a major change in the maxilla shape to consider Xenodens as a juvenile Carinodens, and thus the proposed synonymy of both taxa are not likely.
