= Thoraxion =

Thoraxion Temporal range: Late Cretaceous, early Maastrichtian

Scientific classification
- Kingdom: Animalia
- Phylum: Chordata
- Class: Reptilia
- Order: Squamata
- Clade: †Mosasauria
- Family: †Mosasauridae
- Tribe: †Mosasaurini
- Genus: †Thoraxion; Sharpe et al., 2026
- Species: †T. tahlequahae

Binomial name
- †Thoraxion tahlequahae Sharpe et al., 2026

Extinct genus of mosasaur

Thoraxion (lit. 'small thorax') is an extinct genus of mosasaurine mosasaur in the tribe Mosasaurini, known from the Late Cretaceous (Maastrichtian age) Ciply-Malogne Phosphatic Chalk Formation of Belgium. The genus contains a single species, Thoraxion tahlequahae, known from a partial skull and skeleton.

== Discovery and naming ==
The Thoraxion fossil material was discovered in outcrops of the Ciply-Malogne Phosphatic Chalk Formation in the Mons Basin in Hainaut, Belgium. The specimen is housed in the Royal Belgian Institute of Natural Sciences in Brussels, where it is permanently accessioned as specimen IRSNB R 373. It consists of much of a skeleton and skull preserved in partial articulation, including several cervical (neck) and caudal (tail) vertebrae, most of the trunk (including dorsal vertebrae and ribs), the left pectoral girdle, and part of a forelimb. A string of smaller vertebrae are preservd in abdomen region, representing the gut contents of this animal. This specimen was one of more than 50 collected during the 19th century from chalk quarries in the Mons Basin. Most of these, including IRSNB R 373, have historically been referred to Mosasaurus lemonnieri. The skull of IRSNB R 373 and vertebrae of the consumed animal both exhibit strike marks made by the chalk miners who first discovered the specimen, who were not expecting the presence of a mosasaur fossil.

In a 2026 redescription of Mosasaurus lemonnieri, Henry S. Sharpe and colleagues described Thoraxion tahlequahae as a new genus and species of mosasaurin mosasaur based on these fossil remains, designating IRSNB R 373 as the holotype specimen. The generic name, Thoraxion, is a diminutive derivative of the Ancient Greek θώραξ (thṓrax), alluding to the taxon's compact ribcage compared to that of the coeval M. lemonnieri. The specific name, tahlequahae, honours Tahlequah, a southern resident orca known for exhibiting complex emotional behaviours (mourning after the deaths of two of her calves).

== Description ==
The only known specimen of Thoraxion has an estimated total body length of 6 metres (20 ft). The proportions and general morphology of Thoraxion are broadly similar to Mosasaurus, though many of these similarities are homoplastic (i.e., the result of convergent evolution). Thoraxion has 13 teeth in the maxilla (primary tooth-bearing bone in the upper jaw) and 16 teeth in the dentary (tooth-bearing bone in the lower jaw). The premaxilla (tooth-bearing bone at the front of the snout) is not preserved in the holotype. The teeth are slender and slightly heterodont, with teeth toward the back of the jaws having slightly expanded crowns.

== Classification ==
To test the affinities and relationships of Thoraxion, Sharpe et al. (2026) included it in an updated version of the phylogenetic matrix of Strong et al. (2020). Thoraxion was recovered as a member of the mosasaurine tribe Mosasaurini, in a position diverging after Prognathodon and Eremiasaurus, but before a more derive clade including Mosasaurus and its closest relatives. These results are displayed in the cladogram below:

- - Dallasaurus turneri
  - - Clidastes spp.
    - - Jormungandr walhallaensis
      - - Globidens spp.
        - - Prognathodon kianda
          - - Thalassotitan atrox
            - - Prognathodon waiparaensis
              - - - Prognathodon rapax
                  - - Prognathodon currii
                    - - Prognathodon saturator
                      - Prognathodon solvayi
                - - Prognathodon overtoni
                  - - Eremiasaurus heterodontus
                    - - Thoraxion tahlequahae
                      - - - Plesiotylosaurus crassidens
                          - - Mosasaurus missouriensis
                            - - Mosasaurus hoffmannii
                              - Plotosaurus bennisoni
                        - - Mosasaurus lemonnieri
                          - - Mosasaurus mokoroa
                            - - Megapterygius wakayamaensis
                              - Moanasaurus mangahouangae
