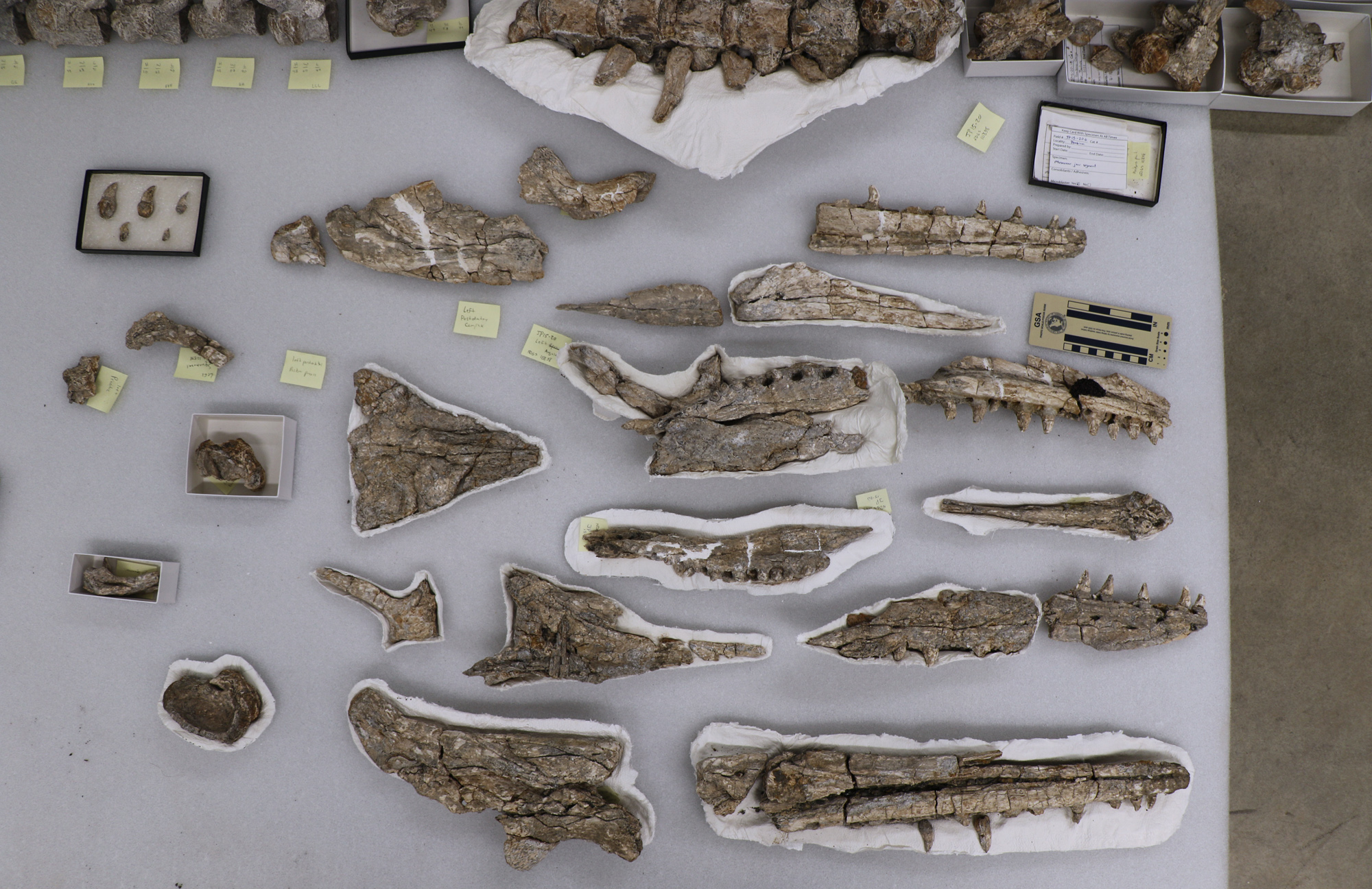
- Fossil material of the Jormungandr holotype

Scientific classification
- Kingdom: Animalia
- Phylum: Chordata
- Class: Reptilia
- Order: Squamata
- Clade: †Mosasauria
- Family: †Mosasauridae
- Subfamily: †Mosasaurinae
- Genus: †Jormungandr
- Species: †J. walhallaensis

Binomial name
- †Jormungandr walhallaensis Zietlow, Boyd & van Vranken 2023

= Jormungandr walhallaensis =

Jormungandr Temporal range: Late Cretaceous (Campanian), 80.04 Ma

Extinct species of mosasaurs

Jormungandr is an extinct genus of mosasaurid squamates from the early Campanian Pierre Shale of North Dakota, United States. The genus contains a single species, J. walhallaensis, known from a nearly-complete skull and partial skeleton. Jormungandr was a medium-sized mosasaur, at around 5–7 metres (16–23 ft) long, and its skeletal anatomy exhibits a mix of features seen in both basal and derived mosasaurines.

== Discovery and naming ==
The holotype and only known specimen of Jormungandr was discovered in 2015 by American fossil collector Deborah Shepherd, who uncovered an isolated bone fragment while revisiting a public fossil dig site near Walhalla, North Dakota. The fossil came from a bentonite layer of the Pembina Member of the Pierre Shale, radiometrically dated to about 80.04 ± 0.11 mya. Shepherd reported her discovery to a park ranger, which led to the notification of North Dakota Geological Survey senior paleontologist Clint Boyd. Boyd subsequently led a volunteer excavation of the site. Fieldwork, which continued through 2018, recovered the remainder of the specimen, consisting of a nearly complete disarticulated skull missing only the braincase, the parietal bone, scleral rings, and parts of the nose (nasals and septomaxilla); all seven cervical vertebrae, five dorsal vertebrae, eleven ribs, and additional postcranial bones that remain unprepared. Nicknamed "Jorgie" by Boyd, the specimen was subsequently accessioned into the collections of the North Dakota Heritage Center under the catalog number NDGS 10838.

The fossils were subsequently described in detail by American paleontologist Amelia Zietlow in collaboration with Boyd and Nathan Van Vranken. The team initially considered the specimen to represent the oldest known occurrence of Mosasaurus, but further preparation of the material revealed several anatomical features showing that it belonged to a distinct mosasaurid taxon occupying an intermediate phylogenetic position between Mosasaurus and the more basal Clidastes. The three authors formally described the new mosasaur under scientific name Jormungandr walhallaensis in a study published in 2023. The specific name walhallaensis refers to the city of Walhalla, whose name is itself derived from Valhalla, the hall of slain warriors in Norse mythology. This etymology inspired the generic name Jormungandr, which refers to Jǫrmungandr, the gigantic sea serpent of the same mythology said to encircle the world's oceans and the second son of the god Loki and the giantess Angrboða. In an interview with The New York Times, Canadian paleontologist Michael Caldwell stated that the new taxon is more likely to represent a new species of Clidastes, in which case it would be renamed as Clidastes walhallaensis. Nevertheless, although the phylogenetic analyses conducted by Zietlow and colleagues recover Jormungandr as being closely related to Clidastes, the authors argue that their taxon exhibits sufficient anatomical differences to warrant the establishment of a distinct genus.

== Description ==
Size of Jormungandr compared to a human

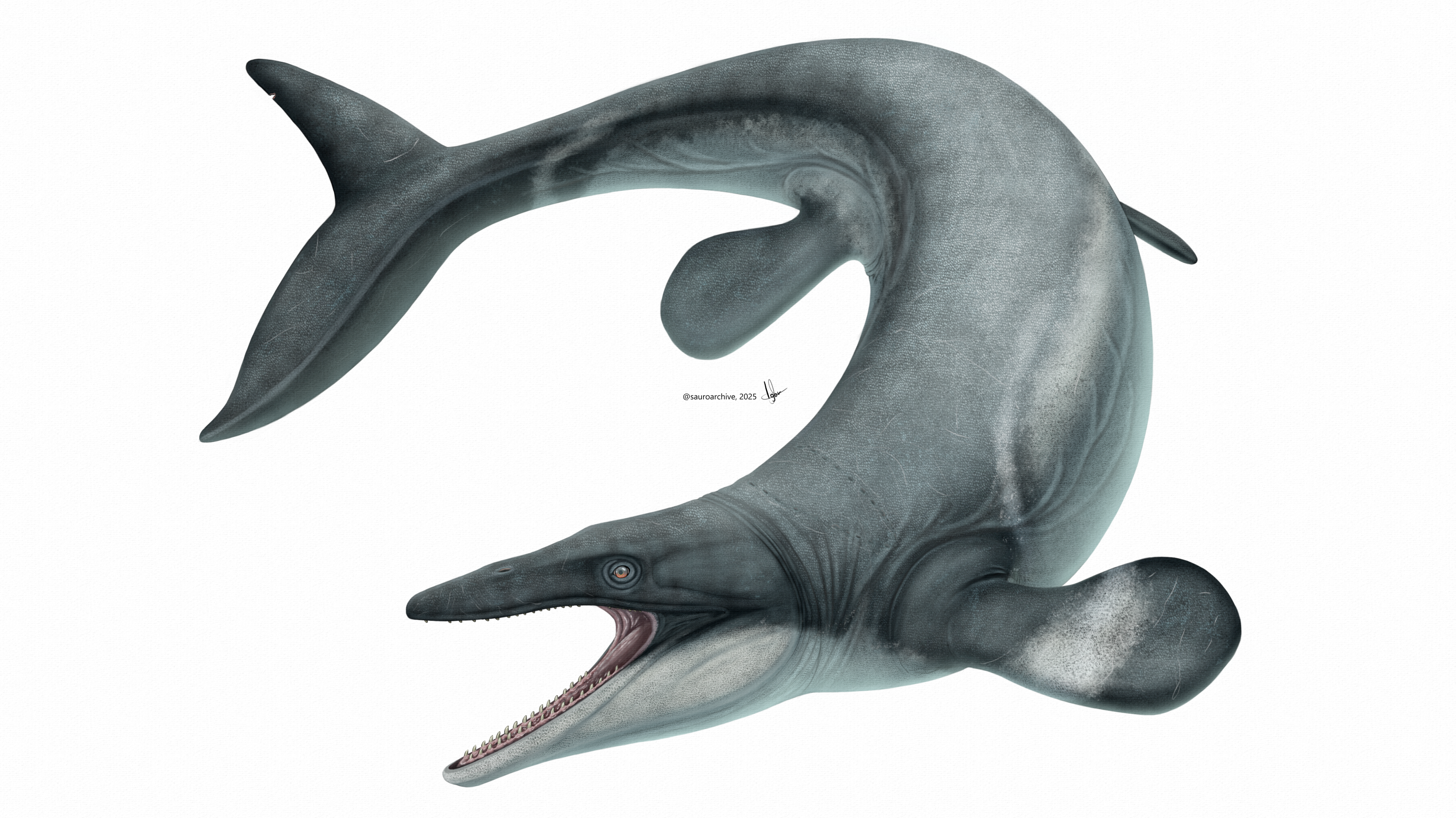
Speculative life restoration of Jormungandr

Jormungandr is a large mosasaur. The holotype skull measures 72 centimeters (28 in) in total length and the lower jaw is 80.8 centimeters (31.8 in) long. Based on these measurements, Zietlow and colleagues estimated a total body length of 5.4–7.3 meters (18–24 ft).

The fossil material of Jormungandr demonstrates features seen in both basal and derived mosasaurines; it shares a high dental count with the more basal Clidastes, as well as the subrectangular quadrate seen in the derived Mosasaurus.

The fourth dorsal vertebra has traces that probably represent bite marks that were formed during a single biting event right before death or some time after death based on the fact that they show no signs of healing. The describers of Jormungandr argued that these supposed bite marks are consistent with those made by mosasaurs but not sharks, and that the tracemaker may have consumed the posterior (back) portion of the skeleton, resulting in the remaining body parts being separated from it.

== Classification ==
In their phylogenetic analyses, Zietlow, Boyd & van Vranken (2023) recovered Jormungandr as a mosasaurine member of the squamate clade Mosasauridae, with Clidastes consistently as its closest relative. The following cladograms represent the phylogenetic results from the strict consensus of parsimony analyses using several extant anguimorphs as outgroups, depicting only the Mosasaurinae clade. Topology A is recovered from the 86 most parsimonious unweighted trees, while Topology B is recovered from five trees with implied weighting (k=12). Definition of Mosasaurinae follows Madzia and Cau (2017).

Unweighted maximum parsimony

- Mosasaurinae
  - Dallasaurus turneri
  - - - Clidastes 'liodontus'
      - Clidastes 'moorevillensis'
      - Clidastes propython
      - Jormungandr walhallaensis
    - - Gnathomortis stadtmani
      - - 'Prognathodon' kianda
        - - Globidens alabamaensis
          - Globidens dakotensis
          - - - 'Prognathodon' overtoni
              - - Plesiotylosaurus crassidens
                - 'Prognathodon' waiparaensis
                - - Eremiasaurus heterodontus
                  - - Plotosaurus bennisoni
                    - - Mosasaurus missouriensis
                      - - Mosasaurus conodon
                        - Mosasaurus hoffmannii
            - - Prognathodon rapax
              - - 'Globidens' schurmanni
                - - Prognathodon solvayi
                  - - Prognathodon currii
                    - Prognathodon saturator

Implied weighting parsimony

- Mosasaurinae
  - Pluridens serpentis
  - Dallasaurus turneri
  - - - Gnathomortis stadtmani
      - - Jormungandr walhallaensis
        - - Clidastes 'liodontus'
          - Clidastes 'moorevillensis'
          - Clidastes propython
    - - 'Prognathodon' kianda
      - - Globidens alabamaensis
        - Globidens dakotensis
        - - - 'Prognathodon' overtoni
            - - Plesiotylosaurus crassidens
              - 'Prognathodon' waiparaensis
              - - Eremiasaurus heterodontus
                - - Plotosaurus bennisoni
                  - - Mosasaurus missouriensis
                    - - Mosasaurus conodon
                      - Mosasaurus hoffmannii
          - - Prognathodon rapax
            - - 'Globidens' schurmanni
              - - Prognathodon solvayi
                - - Prognathodon currii
                  - Prognathodon saturator

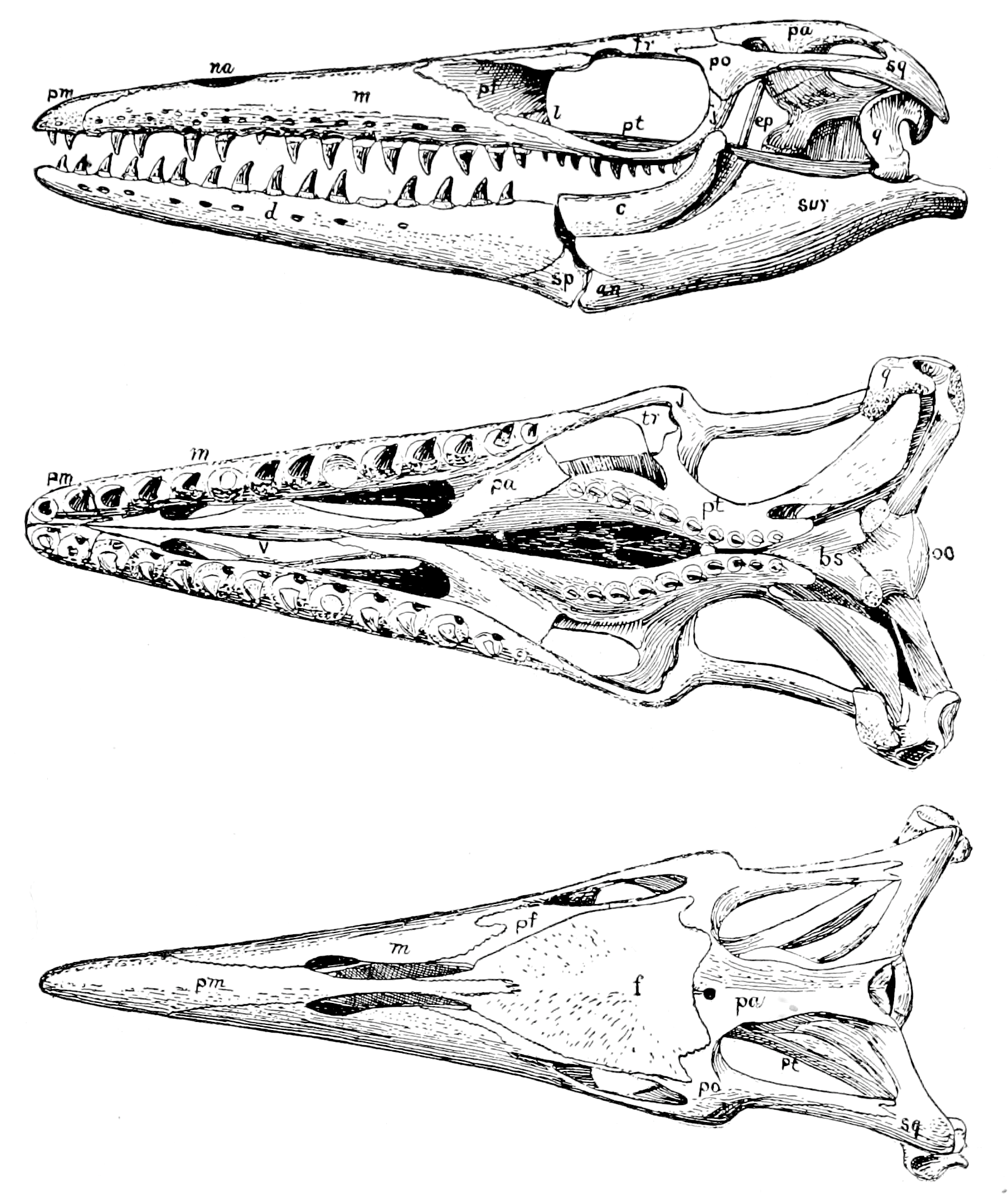
Skull illustrations of the closely-related Clidastes propython

== Palaeoenvironment ==
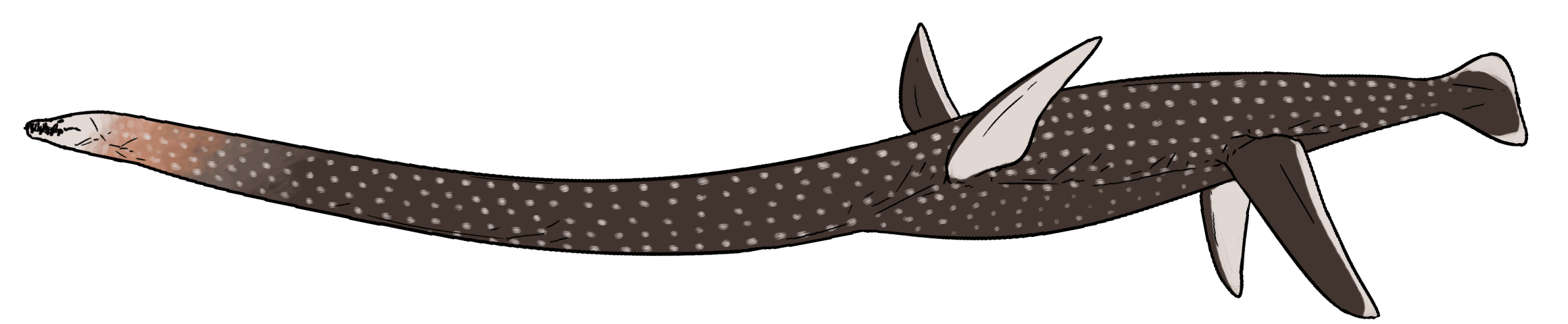
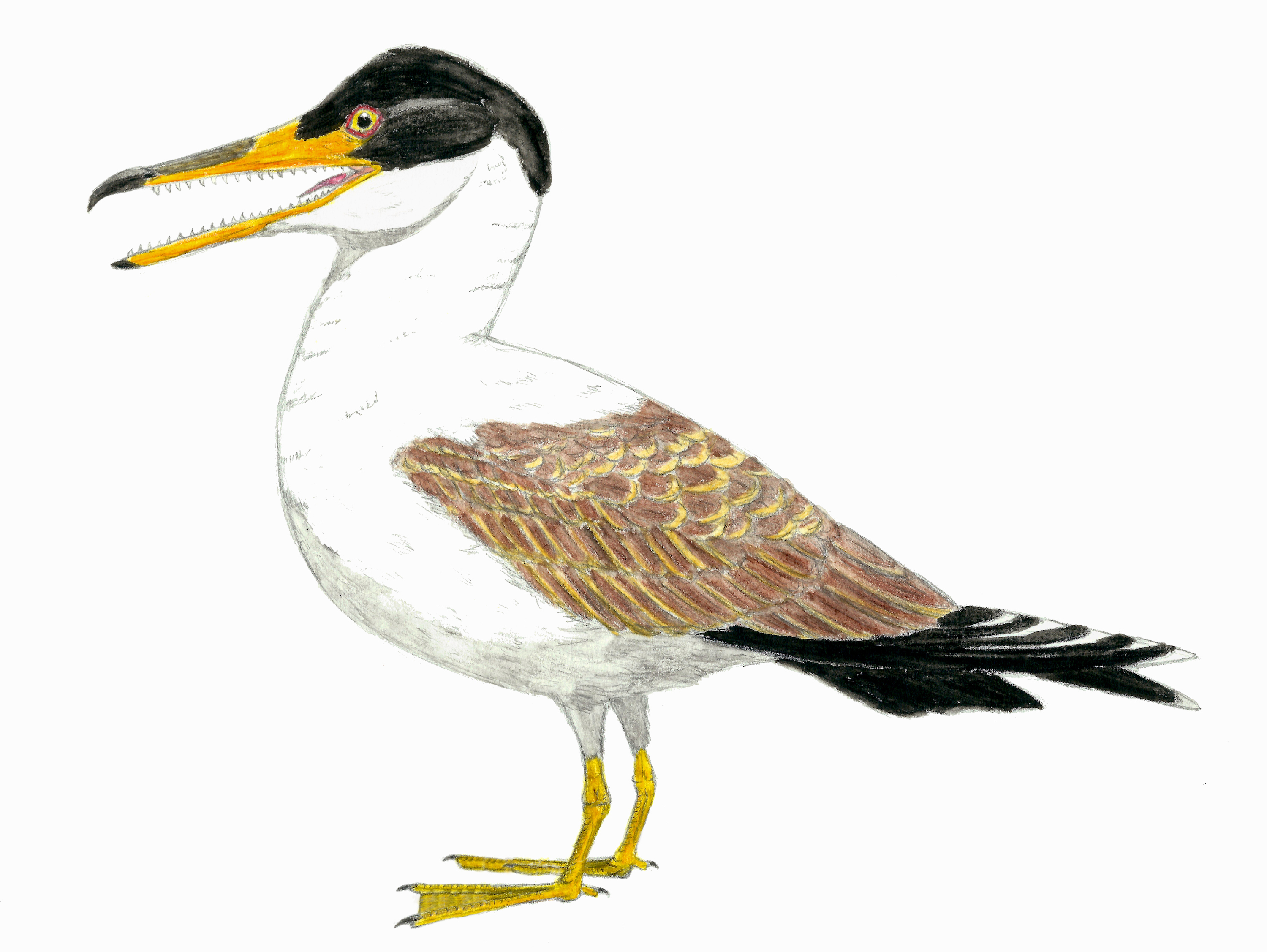
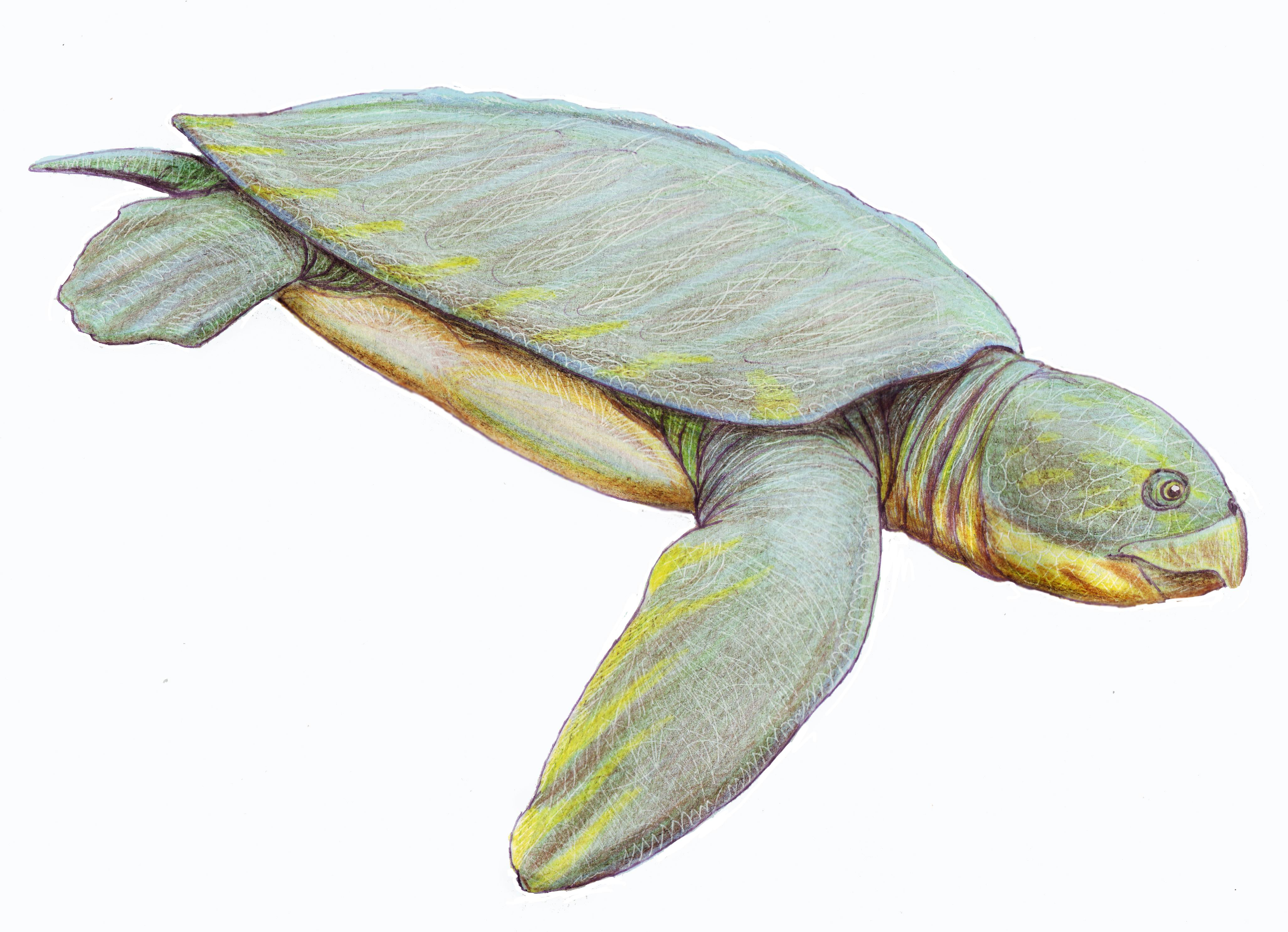
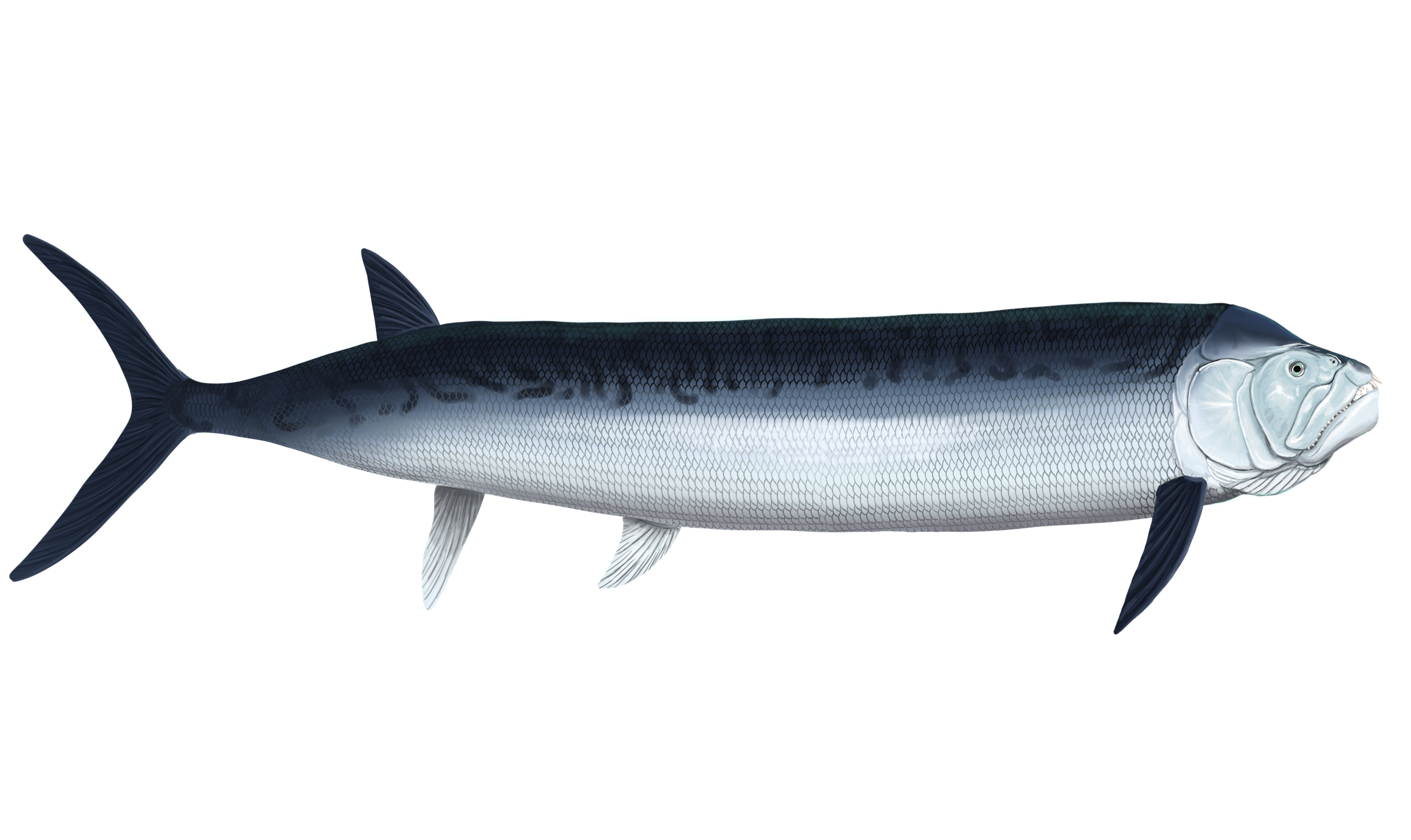
Life restorations of various fossil animals known from the Pembina Member of the Pierre Shale. In clockwise order from the top left: Styxosaurus, Ichthyornis, Xiphactinus, and Protostega

Jormungandr was discovered in layers of the Pierre Shale (Pembina Member) in North Dakota, which dates to the early Campanian age of the late Cretaceous period, around 80.04 million years old. Many other fossil animals have been found here which would have likely been contemporaries of Jormungandr. These include many other mosasaur genera such as Clidastes, Latoplatecarpus, Platecarpus, Plioplatecarpus, and Tylosaurus, as well as birds (Brodavis, Hesperornis, and Ichthyornis), plesiosaurs (Dolichorhynchops, Elasmosaurus, Styxosaurus, and Trinacromerum), turtles (Protostega and Toxochelys), and several bony and cartilaginous fish.
