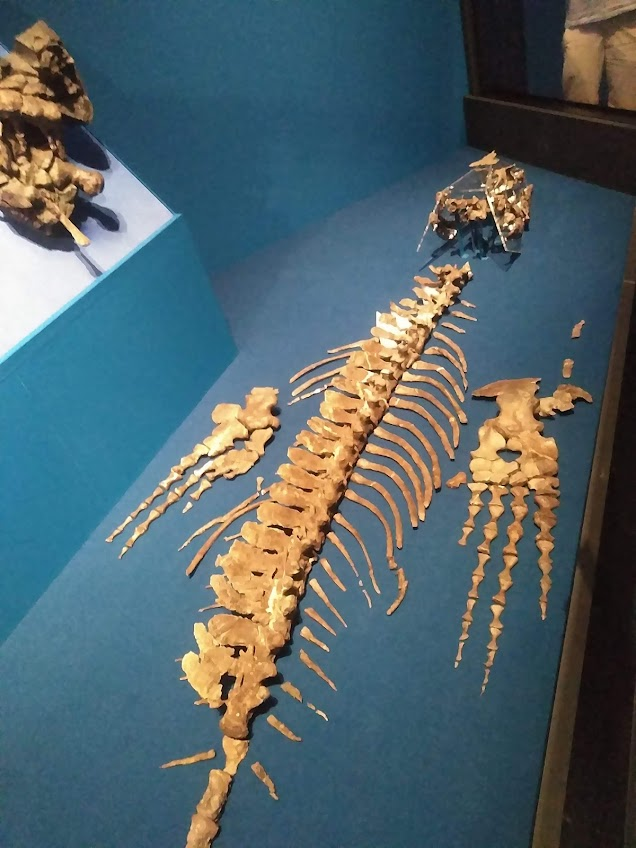
- Type specimen of Megapterygius in the special exhibition at the National Museum of Nature and Science

Scientific classification
- Kingdom: Animalia
- Phylum: Chordata
- Class: Reptilia
- Order: Squamata
- Clade: †Mosasauria
- Family: †Mosasauridae
- Subfamily: †Mosasaurinae
- Genus: †Megapterygius; Konishi et al., 2023

Type species
- †Megapterygius wakayamaensis Konishi et al., 2023

= Megapterygius =

Megapterygius Temporal range: Late Cretaceous (Maastrichtian), 72 Ma

Extinct genus of mosasaurs

Megapterygius (meaning "large wing") is an extinct genus of mosasaurine mosasaur from the Late Cretaceous Toyajo Formation (Hasegawa Muddy Sandstone Member) of Japan. The genus contains a single species, M. wakayamaensis, known from an almost complete skeleton.

== Discovery and naming ==
The Megapterygius holotype specimen, WMNH-Ge-1140240002, was discovered in 2006 by Akihiro Misaki in sediments of the Hasegawa Muddy Sandstone Member of the Toyajo Formation near the peak of Mt. Toyajo in Wakayama Prefecture of Japan. The specimen consists of a partial skull, a complete cervical and dorsal vertebral series with more than 40 vertebrae, ribs, both front flippers, and the left hind flipper.

In 2023, Konishi et al. described Megapterygius wakayamaensis as a new genus and species of mosasaurine based on these fossil remains. The generic name, "Megapterygius", is derived from the Ancient Greek mégas, meaning large, and pterygion, meaning wing, referencing the unusually large wing-shaped flippers seen in Megapterygius. The specific name "wakayamaensis" honors Wakayama Prefecture, where the holotype was found and is currently kept.

The Japanese name for Megapterygius is "Wakayama Soryu" (和歌山滄竜), which translates to "Wakayama blue dragon". The word "Soryu" (滄竜) itself is used to refer to mosasaurs.

== Description ==
Size comparison

Megapterygius is a medium-sized mosasaur with an estimated skull length of 0.8 metres (2.6 ft) and a body length of approximately 6 metres (20 ft). Both the front and hind flippers are longer than the skull. This feature is not seen in any other mosasauroid with paddle-like limbs. Furthermore, the hind flippers are even larger than the front flippers, which is otherwise only seen in Tylosaurus.

The neural spines of the Megapterygius holotype posterior dorsal vertebrae exhibit an abrupt change in orientation, with at least five neural spines projecting anterodorsally. This is also seen in some delphinoid whales, where it corresponds to the base of a dorsal fin. Also like cetaceans, the change in orientation occurs posterior to the center of gravity of the animal, where in Megapterygius, the affected vertebrae are located after the main rib cage. If present, a dorsal fin in a mosasaur could provide stability while moving underwater. Megapterygius represents the first published evidence for such a structure in mosasaurs.

== Classification ==
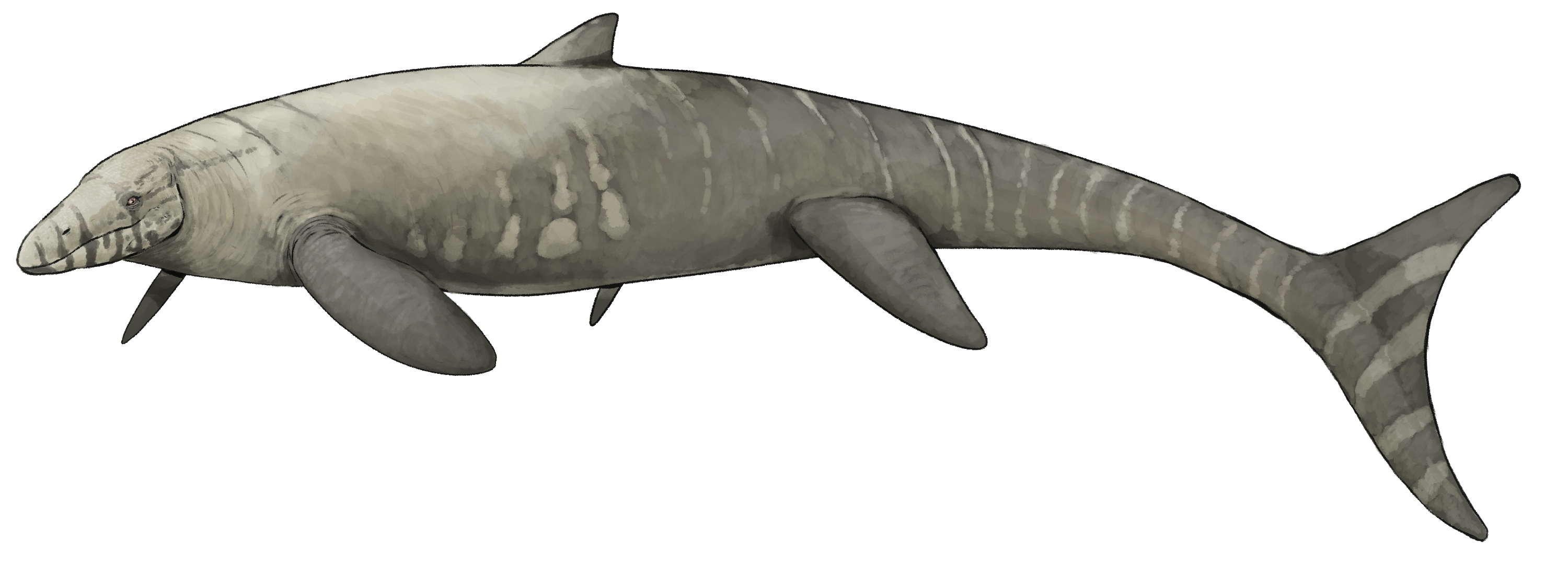
Life restoration

Konishi (2023) recovered Megapterygius as a mosasaurine member of the squamate clade Mosasauridae, as the sister taxon to a clade containing Moanasaurus, Rikisaurus, Mosasaurus spp., and Plotosaurus. The 50% majority-rule consensus results of their phylogenetic analyses are shown in the cladogram below:

- Mosasaurinae
  - Dallasaurus
  - - Prognathodon currii
    - Prognathodon solvayi
    - - Eremiasaurus
      - - Prognathodon kianda
        - - Prognathodon waiparaensis
          - - Clidastes moorevillensis
            - - Clidastes propython
              - Clidastes liodontus
        - - - Globidens dakotensis
            - Globidens alabamaensis
          - - Prognathodon rapax
            - - - Prognathodon overtoni
                - Prognathodon saturator
              - - Plesiotylosaurus
                - - Megapterygius
                  - - - Moanasaurus
                      - Rikisaurus (Moanasaurus)
                    - - Mosasaurus missouriensis
                      - - Plotosaurus
                        - - Mosasaurus lemonnieri
                          - - Mosasaurus hoffmannii
                            - Mosasaurus maximus

== Paleobiology ==
The humeral head of Megapterygius is saddle-shaped and mediolaterally thick. This likely indicates a high range of motion for both adduction/abduction and protraction/retraction of the front flippers, allowing for quick maneuvering. The femoral head is well-rounded and almost circular in proximal view, which suggests that Megapterygius was capable of rapid pitch control (rotation) and braking. Skull part around eye socket is slightly wide horizontally, which suggests that had binocular vision that helped it to hunt prey. After Phosphorosaurus, this is the second case of mosasaur with binocular vision. Although the tail is not well preserved in the Megapterygius holotype, based on related taxa, it likely had a crescent-shaped tail fin that could have aided in propulsion and fast turning. Based on the combination of all of these features and the large size of the flippers, Konishi et al. speculate that Megapterygius would have been a capable hunter of large groups of small prey items that were hard to capture, like schools of fish.

== Paleoecology ==
Fossils of ammonites (Pachydiscus awajiensis), bivalves (Nanonavis sp., Apiotrigonia sp. and Inoceramus sp.), and gastropods (Globularia izumiensis, Gigantocapulus problematicus) have also been found near the Megapterygius holotype site. In addition, more than one hundred squaliform shark teeth were found around the Megapterygius holotype, suggesting it was scavenged by these sharks after it died.
