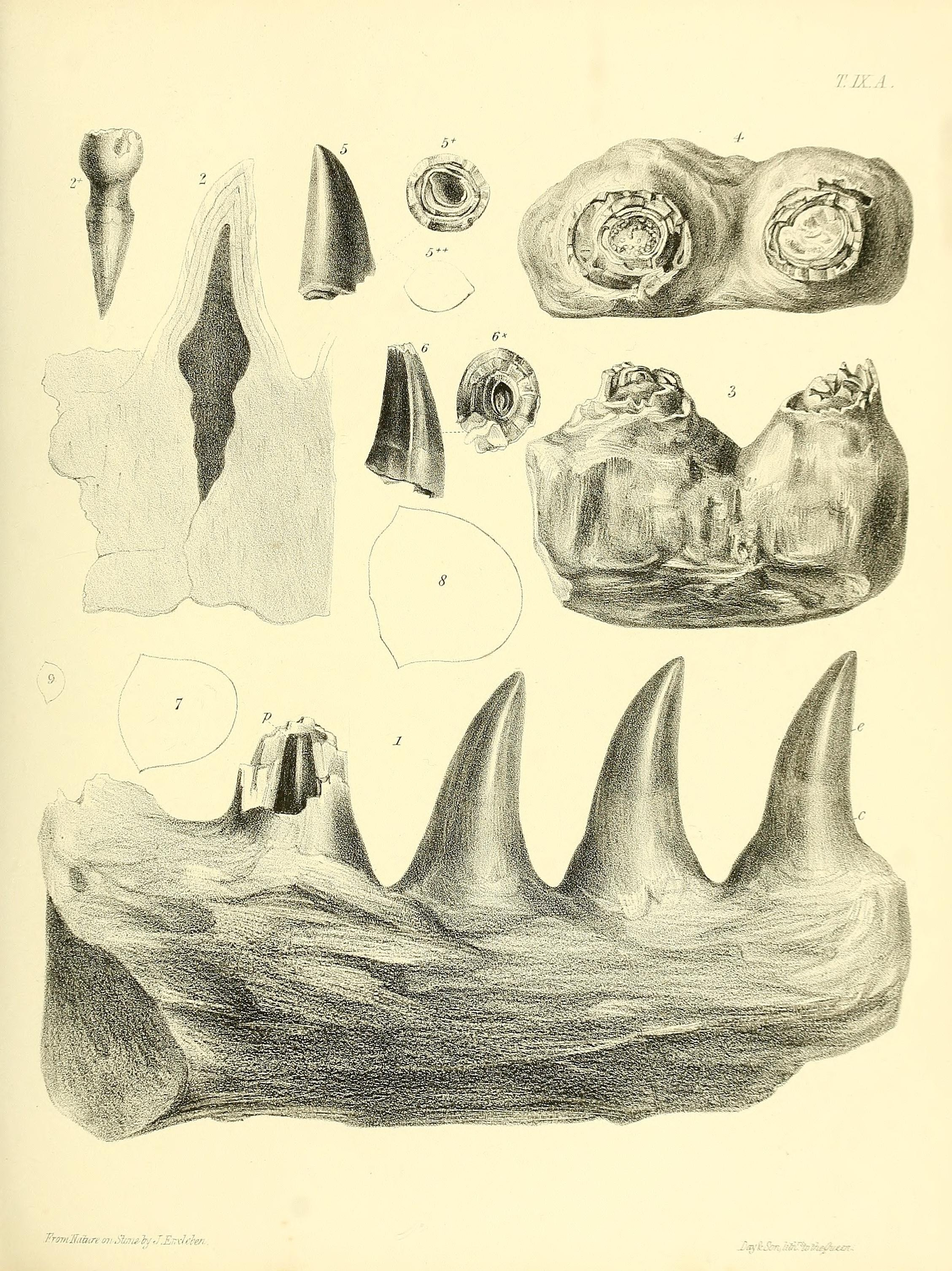
- Drawings of teeth and jaw elements referred to Liodon anceps by Richard Owen

Scientific classification
- Kingdom: Animalia
- Phylum: Chordata
- Class: Reptilia
- Order: Squamata
- Clade: †Mosasauria
- Family: †Mosasauridae
- Subfamily: †Mosasaurinae
- Genus: †Liodon; Agassiz, 1846
- Species: †L. anceps

Binomial name
- †Liodon anceps (Owen, 1841)

Synonyms
- Leiodon Owen, 1841 (preoccupied)

= Liodon =

Liodon Temporal range: Late Cretaceous, Campanian–Maastrichtian

Extinct genus of lizards

Liodon is a dubious genus of mosasaur from the Late Cretaceous, known from fragmentary fossils discovered in St James' Pit, England. Though dubious and of uncertain phylogenetic affinities, Liodon was historically an important taxon in mosasaur systematics, being one of the genera on which the family Mosasauridae was based.

== History ==
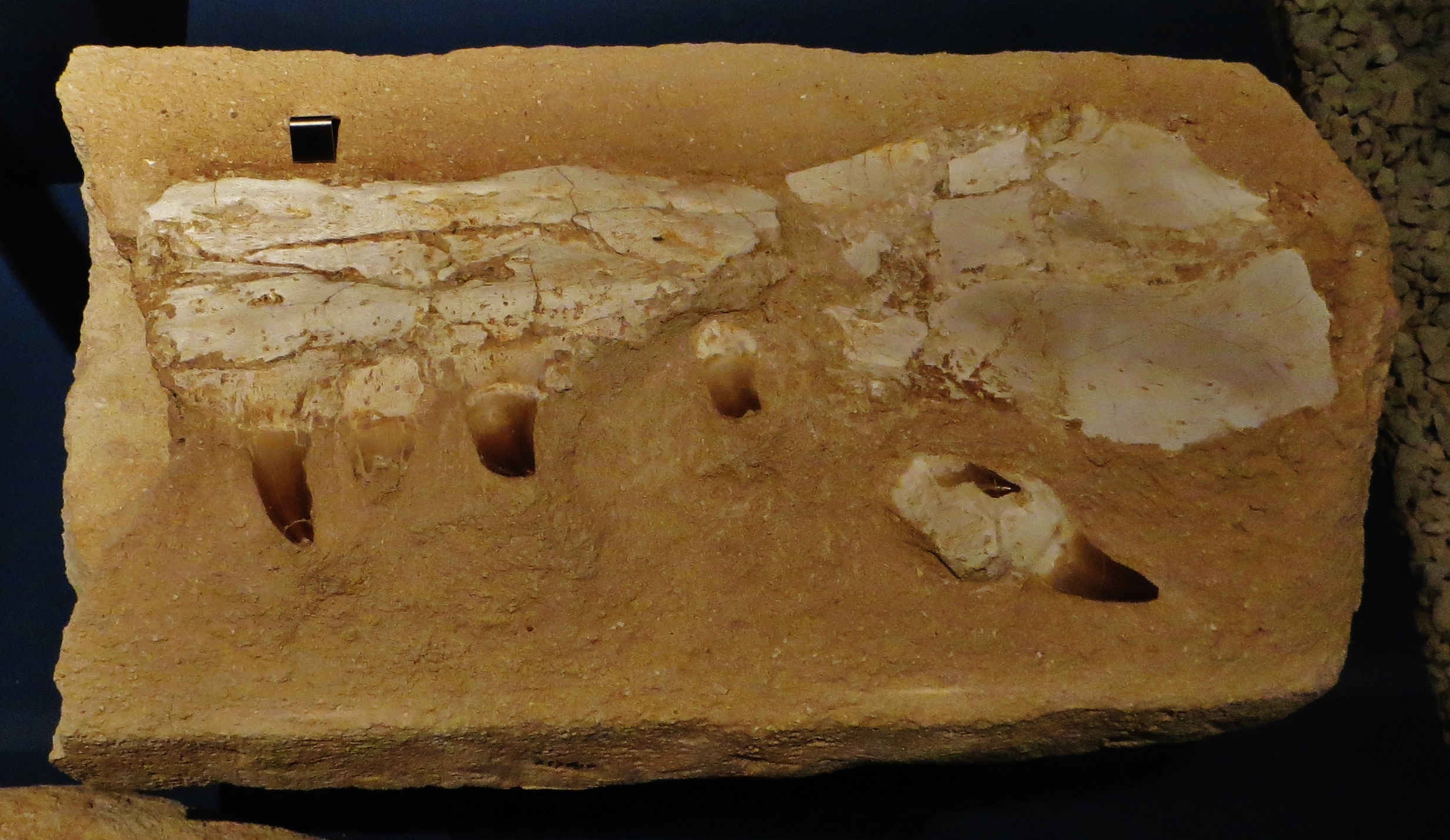
Moroccan mosasaur fossil erroneously assigned to Liodon anceps. Moroccan fossils classified as Liodon typically belong to Eremiasaurus or Thalassotitan.

Liodon anceps was first described as "Leiodon anceps" by Richard Owen in 1841, based only on two tooth fragments and a minor portion of the corresponding jaw bone discovered in Essex, England. The name Leiodon derived from the Greek leios ("smooth") and -odon ("tooth"), meaning "smooth tooth" on account of the "smooth and polished surface" of the fossil teeth. The specific name anceps means "two-edged", referencing the carinae (cutting edges) on both the front and back of the teeth. In 1845, Owen noted that the teeth he assigned to Leiodon were more reminiscent of those of Mosasaurus than any other reptile and in 1851 placed both genera in the new clade Natantia within the suborder Lacertilia.

In 1846, Louis Agassiz noted that the generic name Leiodon was already preoccupied by the fish Leiodon (described in 1839) and consequently changed the spelling to Liodon, which carries the same meaning. In 1853, Liodon was one of the original genera included in the definition of the family Mosasauridae by Paul Gervais. The other genera initially included in the family were Mosasaurus, Onchosaurus (later recognized to have been a batoid fish), Oplosaurus (a sauropod dinosaur), Macrosaurus (a historical mosasaur "wastebasket taxon") and Geosaurus (a thalattosuchian crocodyliform).

Over the course of the later nineteenth century, more species of Liodon were described. In addition to material later assigned to Tylosaurus, the three most enduring species assigned to Liodon were L. sectorius in 1871 and L. mosasauroides and L. compressidens in 1892. These species were based on more well-preserved material than L. anceps and gave Liodon a worldwide distribution, with material being assigned to L. mosasauroides from France and L. sectorius from New Jersey and the Netherlands. Another species, L. asiaticum, was described in 1915 based on fragmentary fossils found near Jerusalem. In addition to these species, isolated teeth from various locations, including Poland, the Netherlands and Morocco, have also been assigned to Liodon in the past.

In 1952, Camille Arambourg assigned isolated fossil teeth discovered in the Maastrichtian-age phosphates of Morocco to Mosasaurus (Leiodon) cf. anceps. It has since been accepted that the small teeth previously attributed to this taxon actually belong to Eremiasaurus heterodontus, while the larger ones likely belong to Thalassotitan.

In 1993, Theagarten Lingam-Soliar argued that Liodon was a distinct genus and definable on account of its highly specialized teeth, which Lingham-Soliar believed made it "probably the most efficient in the Mosasauridae for tearing off chunks of soft bodied prey such as fishes and other marine reptiles". Lingham-Soliar also suggested that a mosasaur skeleton from Japan otherwise identified as Mosasaurus hobetsuensis could be a Liodon specimen.

L. compressidens, L. mosasauroides and L. sectorius were reassigned as species of Prognathodon by Schulp et al. (2008). This reassignment followed from the discovery that the L. anceps type specimen was presently missing all tooth material (and as a result all of its supposedly diagnostic features), rendering it a nomen dubium, and from the description of the Prognathodon species P. kianda from Angola. The teeth of P. kianda had a highly similar morphology to those of the three Liodon species, meaning that they were determined as falling within the range of variation of the genus. In 2014, Palci et al. suggested that Liodon should be synonymized with Mosasaurus on account of the differences between the two mostly being in the form of tooth morphology, otherwise "consistent with differentiation at the species level only". Palci et al. also put forth the idea that L. anceps and the three species assigned to Prognathodon in 2008 were more closely related to each other and to Mosasaurus than either was to Prognathodon, though made no formal taxonomic revisions. A 2021 analysis of the L. asiaticum material determined L. asiaticum to be a nomen dubium and reclassified its fossils as Mosasaurini incertae sedis after determining them to be non-diagnostic and close to Mosasaurus and Plotosaurus.

== Classification ==
Dale Russell classified Liodon within the Mosasaurini tribe of the Mosasaurinae subfamily in 1967 owing to the "great resemblance" of the fossils of L. mosasauroides to Mosasaurus. Over the course of the late 19th and early 20th century, several researchers, including Albert Gaudry in 1892 and Per-Ove Persson in 1959, suggested that L. anceps (but not any of the other species) were congeneric with the tylosaurine genus Hainosaurus, which Russell also believed was a possibility.

Despite this, Liodon is traditionally (with or without any species in addition to L. anceps) maintained in the Mosasaurinae on account of the small differences separating it from Mosasaurus. Schulp et al. conceived L. anceps as a basally branching close relative of Prognathodon.

== See also ==
- List of mosasaur genera
- Timeline of mosasaur research
