= P. crassidens =

P. crassidens may refer to:

- Panthera crassidens, an extinct leopard species that lived during the late Pliocene and early Pleistocene in Africa
- Plesiotylosaurus crassidens, a mosasaur species from the Maastrichtian stage of the Late Cretaceous of North America
- Pseudorca crassidens, the false killer whale, an oceanic dolphin cetacean species

== See also ==
- Crassidens
