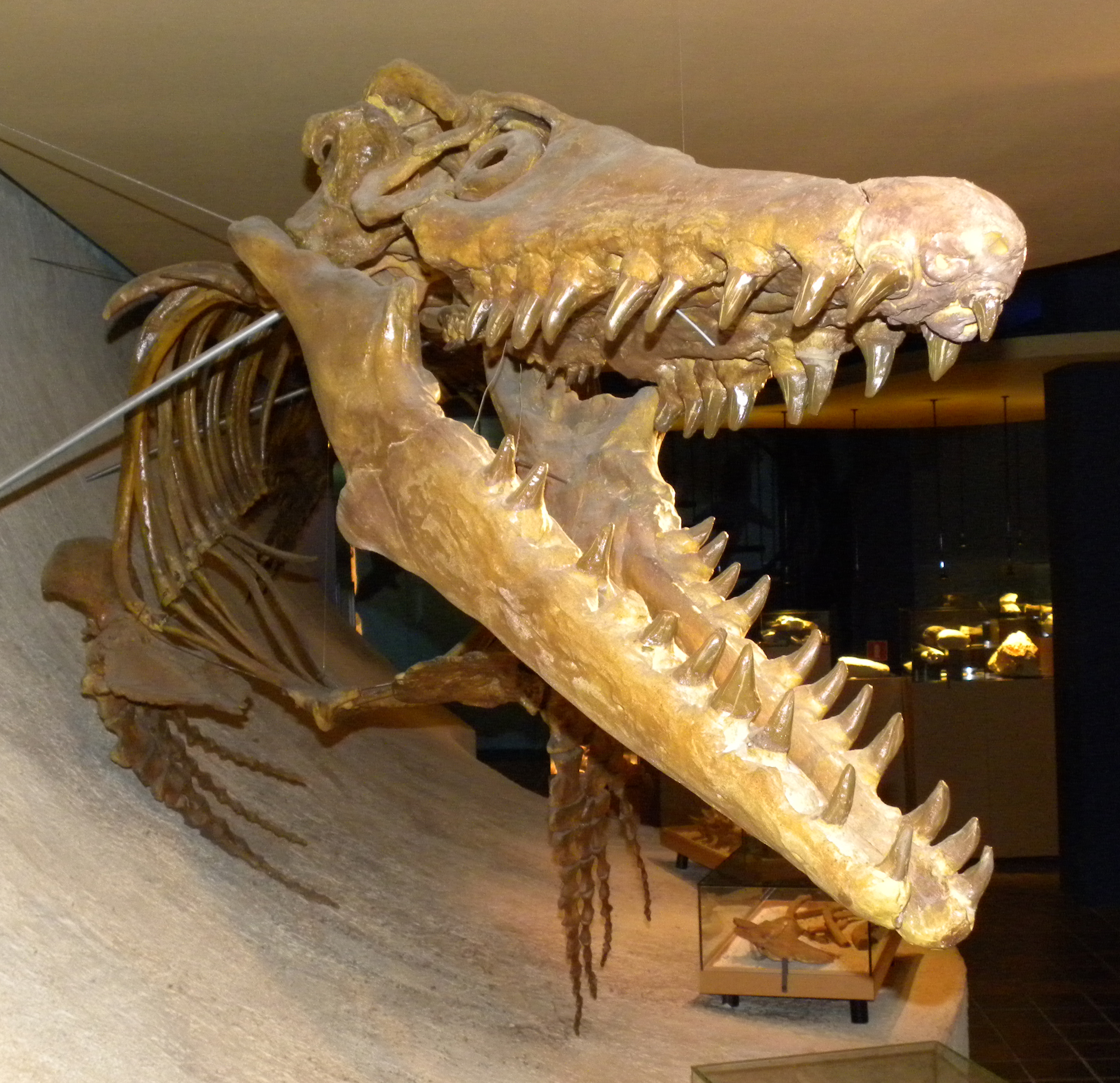
- Skeleton of Mosasaurus (front view) in the Maastricht Natural History Museum.

Scientific classification
- Kingdom: Animalia
- Phylum: Chordata
- Class: Reptilia
- Order: Squamata
- Clade: †Mosasauria
- Family: †Mosasauridae
- Subfamily: †Mosasaurinae
- Tribe: †Mosasaurini; Russell, 1967

Genera
- †Bentiabasaurus; †Eremiasaurus; †Moanasaurus; †Mosasaurus; †Plotosaurus; †Thoraxion

Synonyms
- Plotosaurini Russell, 1967

= Mosasaurini =

Mosasaurins Temporal range: Campanian-Maastrichtian, 82.7–66.0 Ma

Extinct tribe of lizards

Mosasaurini is an extinct tribe of mosasaurine mosasaurs who lived during the Late Cretaceous and whose fossils have been found in North America, South America, Europe, Africa and Oceania, with questionable occurrences in Asia. They are highly derived mosasaurs, containing genera like Plotosaurus, having unique adaptations to fast swimming speeds, or Mosasaurus, which is among the largest known marine reptiles.

== Classification ==
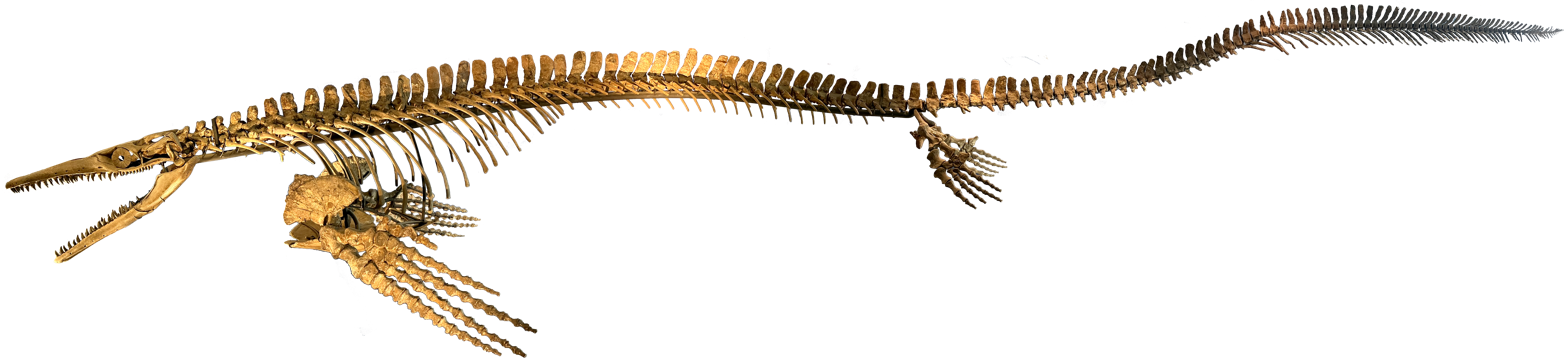
Skeletal mount of Plotosaurus bennisoni

The tribe was erected by Russell in 1967, stating that it is unified by having twelve or less pygal vertebrae and that the radius and ulna are widely separated by a bridge of carpalia on the distal border of the antebrachial foramen. But In a 1997 study, paleontologist Gorden Bell recovered Plotosaurus, which was formerly classified within another tribe called the Plotosaurini, as a sister genus to Mosasaurus. This rendered the Mosasaurini paraphyletic, which meant that it now contains a descendant lineage (Plotosaurini) that is not classified under it, and made its definition defunct. Paraphylies are forbidden in cladistics and so scientists must reclassify groups in order to eliminate such discrepancies if possible. Bell proposed that the Mosasaurini should be abandoned and that all members of the tribe should be incorporated into the Plotosaurini. While other scientists agree that a tribe containing Mosasaurus should be monophyletic, they argue that Mosasaurini should be the valid tribe. For example, in a 2012 study, Aaron LeBlanc, Caldwell, and Bardet argued that, while it is not necessarily invalid, abandoning Mosasaurini would not follow the general principle of the type genus carrying over to all ranks in a classification hierarchy, and that the original diagnostics of the Plotosaurini is outdated.

The taxa Mosasaurini has historically been more inclusive, on occasion including genera such as Plesiotylosaurus, Liodon and Clidastes, all of which are now seen as more basal mosasaurines.

A more recently suggested definition is a branch-based definition diagnosing the Mosasaurini as the most inclusive clade containing Mosasaurus hoffmannii but not Globidens dakotensis.
