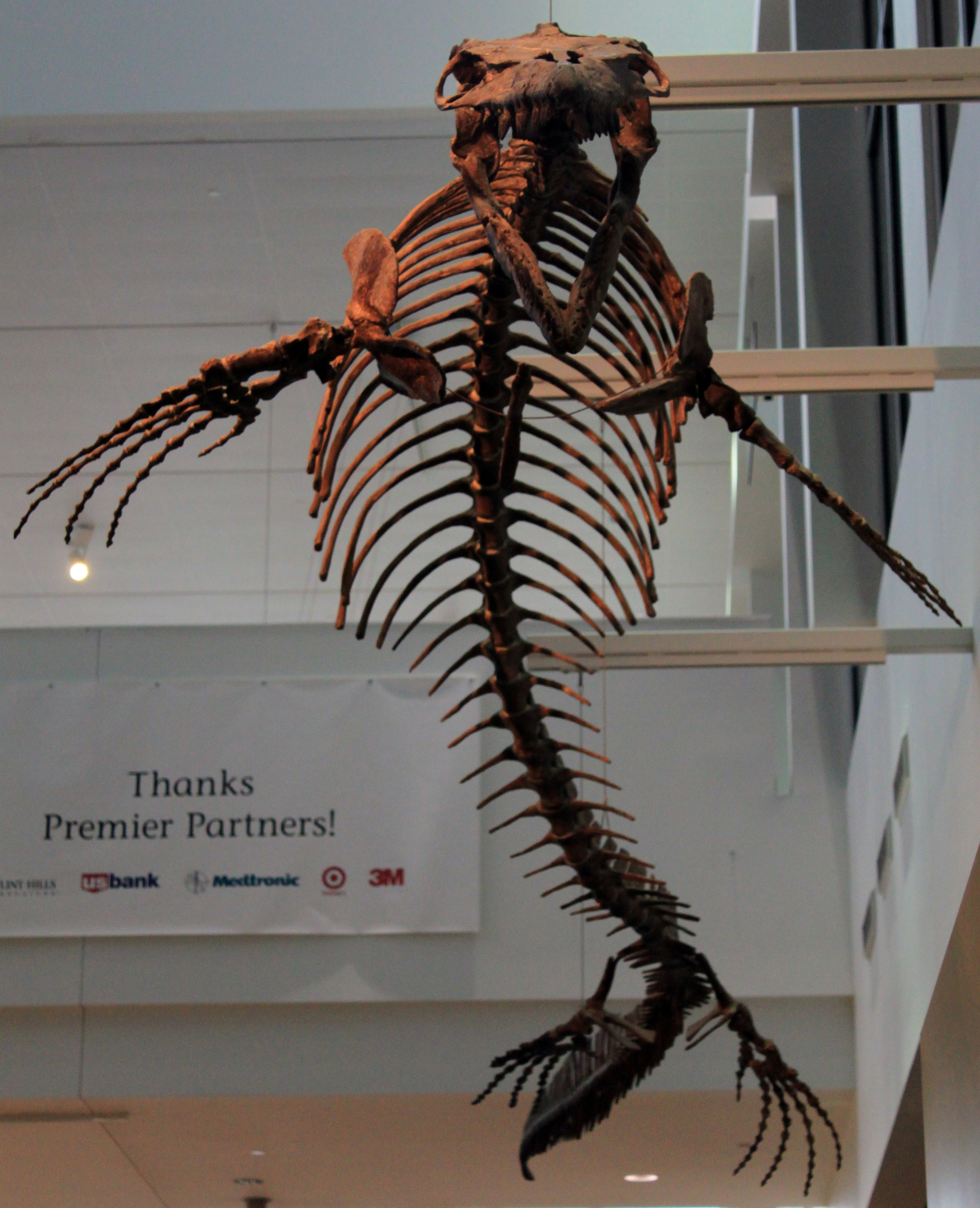
- Mounted skeleton of Mosasaurus conodon, Minnesota Science Museum

Scientific classification
- Kingdom: Animalia
- Phylum: Chordata
- Class: Reptilia
- Order: Squamata
- Clade: †Mosasauria
- Family: †Mosasauridae
- Subfamily: †Mosasaurinae; Gervais, 1853

Type species
- †Mosasaurus hoffmannii Mantell, 1829

Genera
- †Amphekepubis; †Clidastes; †Dallasaurus; †Gnathomortis; †Goronyosaurus?; †Jormungandr; †Kourisodon; †Liodon; †Megapterygius; †Plesiotylosaurus; †Prognathodon; †Stelladens; †Thalassotitan; †Xenodens; †Globidensini; †Carinodens; †Globidens; †Harranasaurus; †Igdamanosaurus; †Mosasaurini; †Bentiabasaurus; †Eremiasaurus; †Moanasaurus; †Mosasaurus; †Plotosaurus; †Thoraxion

= Mosasaurinae =

Mosasaurines Temporal range: Late Cretaceous, 92–66 Ma

Subfamily of reptiles

The Mosasaurinae are a subfamily of mosasaurs, a diverse group of Late Cretaceous marine squamates. Members of the subfamily are informally and collectively known as "mosasaurines" and their fossils have been recovered from every continent.

The lineage first appears in the Turonian and thrived until the K-Pg mass extinction at the end of the Maastrichtian. They ranged in size from some of the smallest known mosasaurs (Carinodens, 3–3.5 meters), to medium-sized taxa (Clidastes, 6+ meters), to the largest of the mosasaurs (Mosasaurus hoffmannii) potentially reaching about 13 m in length. Many genera of mosasaurines were either piscivorous or generalists, preying on fish and other marine reptiles, but one lineage, the Globidensini, evolved specialized crushing teeth, adapting to a diet of ammonites and/or marine turtles.

Though represented by relatively small forms throughout the Turonian and Santonian, such as Clidastes, the lineage diversified during the Campanian and had by the Maastrichtian grown into the most diverse and species-rich mosasaur subfamily.

The etymology of the group derives from the genus Mosasaurus (Latin Mosa = "Meuse river" + Greek sauros = "lizard").

== Description ==
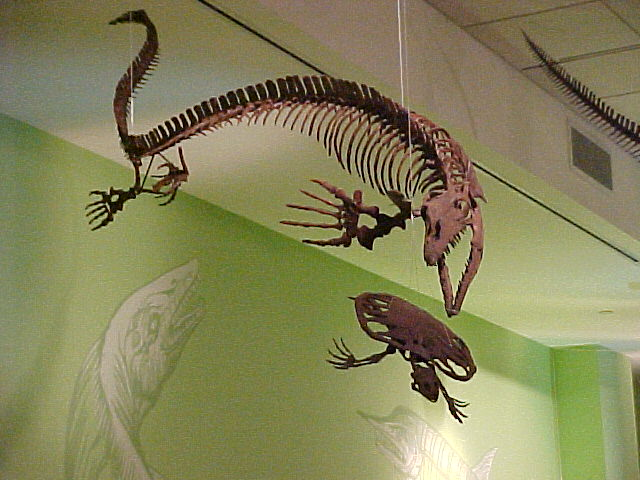
Skeleton of Clidastes liodontus mounted as if pursuing a fossil sea turtle

Russell (1967, pp. 123–124) defined the Mosasaurinae as differing from all other mosasaurs as follows: "Small rostrum present or absent anterior to premaxillary teeth. Fourteen or more teeth present in dentary and maxilla. Cranial nerves X, XI, and XII leave lateral wall of opisthotic through two foramina. No canal or groove in floor of basioccipital or basisphenoid for basilar artery. Suprastapedial process of quadrate distally expanded. Dorsal edge of surangular thin lamina of bone rising anteriorly to posterior surface of coronoid...At least 31, usually 42–45 presacral vertebrae present. Length of presacral series exceeds that of postsacral, neural spines of posterior caudal vertebrae elongated to form distinct fin. Appendicular elements with smoothly finished articular surfaces, tarsus and carpus well ossified." In his 1997 revision of the phylogeny of the Mosasauroidea, Bell (pp. 293–332) retained the Mosasaurinae as a clade, though he reassigned Russell's tribe Prognathodontini to the Mosasaurinae and recognized a new tribe of mosasaurines, the Globidensini.

The subfamily is generally recognised as containing two subdivisions, the tribes Globidensini (Globidens and its closest relatives) and Mosasaurini (Mosasaurus and its closest relatives). A third tribe, the Prognathodontini (Prognathodon and its closest relatives, such as Plesiotylosaurus), is also used on occasion. "Clidastini" or the adjective "clidastine" is also used sometimes, but generally refers to an adaptive grade close to and containing the genus Clidastes, rather than an actual clade.

== Relationships ==
Cladogram of the Mosasaurinae modified from Longrich et al., 2022:

- Mosasaurinae
  - Kourisodon
  - - Clidastes
    - - - Globidensini
          - - Globidens simplex
            - Globidens schurmanni
            - Globidens phosphaticus
            - Prognathodon rapax (=Ancylocentrum hungerfordi)
          - - Globidens alambamensis
            - Globidens dakotensis
        - Prognathodontini
          - Gnathomortis
          - - - Prognathodon overtoni
              - - - Prognathodon saturator
                  - - Thalassotitan atrox
                    - Prognathodon currii
                - Prognathodon giganteus
            - - Prognathodon lutugini
              - Prognathodon solvayi
      - Mosasaurini
        - - Moanasaurus
          - Mosasaurus mokoroa
        - - - - - Mosasaurus conodon
                - Plesiotylosaurus
                - Plotosaurus
              - - Mosasaurus missouriensis
                - - Mosasaurus lemonnieri
                  - - - Mosasaurus hoffmannii
                      - Mosasaurus beaugei
                    - Mosasaurus maximus
                  - - Liodon
                    - Mosasaurus sp. (MGGC 21876)
            - "Magahouanga mosasaurine"
          - - Carinodens
            - Xenodens
