= Gnathomortis =

Gnathomortis Temporal range: Early Campanian 80.97–79.01 Ma

Scientific classification
- Kingdom: Animalia
- Phylum: Chordata
- Class: Reptilia
- Order: Squamata
- Clade: †Mosasauria
- Family: †Mosasauridae
- Subfamily: †Mosasaurinae
- Genus: †Gnathomortis; Lively, 2020
- Species: †G. stadtmani

Binomial name
- †Gnathomortis stadtmani (Kass, 1999)

Synonyms
- "Prognathodon" stadtmani Kass, 1999

Extinct genus of lizards

Gnathomortis (meaning "jaws of death") is an extinct genus of marine lizard belonging to the mosasaur family. Fossils of Gnathomortis have been recovered from the Early Campanian Mancos Shale of Colorado. The genus contains a single species, G. stadtmani, considered a species of the related Prognathodon up until its 2020 redescription. It was a large mosasaur measuring 10.5 metres (34 ft) long.

Life restoration

Gnathomortis was originally named as a species of Prognathodon in 1999. A phylogenetic analysis by Schulp et al. (2006) found that Prognathodon species coded in their analysis comprise one clade, but that "Prognathodon" stadtmani fell outside that clade, and as such did not fit in that genus. Although the holotype of "P." stadtmani consists only of a partial skull and vertebral column (catalogued as BYU 13082), further preparation of the specimen revealed unique features of the quadrate and skull roof, on the basis of which Lively moved it to the new genus Gnathomortis in 2020.
