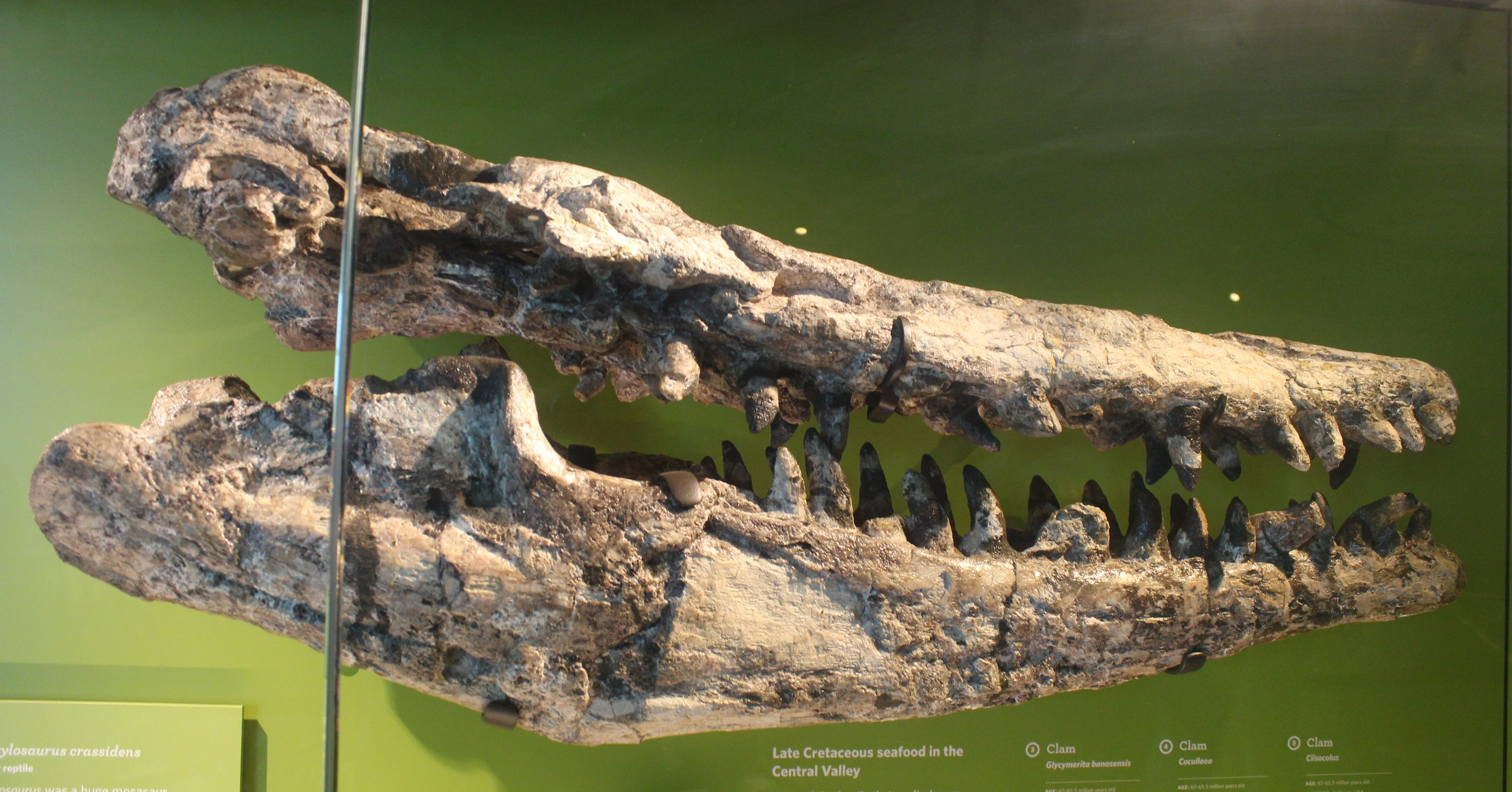
- Holotype skull (LACM 2759)

Scientific classification
- Kingdom: Animalia
- Phylum: Chordata
- Class: Reptilia
- Order: Squamata
- Clade: †Mosasauria
- Family: †Mosasauridae
- Genus: †Plesiotylosaurus; Camp, 1942
- Species: †P. crassidens

Binomial name
- †Plesiotylosaurus crassidens Camp, 1942

= Plesiotylosaurus =

Plesiotylosaurus Temporal range: Maastrichtian, 70–66 Ma

Extinct genus of lizards

Plesiotylosaurus, meaning "near Tylosaurus", is an extinct genus of marine lizard belonging to the mosasaur family. It is classified as part of the Mosasaurinae subfamily, alongside genera like Mosasaurus and Prognathodon. The genus contains one species, Plesiotylosaurus crassidens, recovered from deposits of Middle Maastrichtian age in the Moreno Formation in California.

Though it is classified as a mosasaurine mosasaur, and not closely related to Tylosaurus, the name is not entirely misplaced as a number of cranial features found in the relatively intact holotype skull suggest some degree of convergent evolution with tylosaurine mosasaurs.

== Description ==
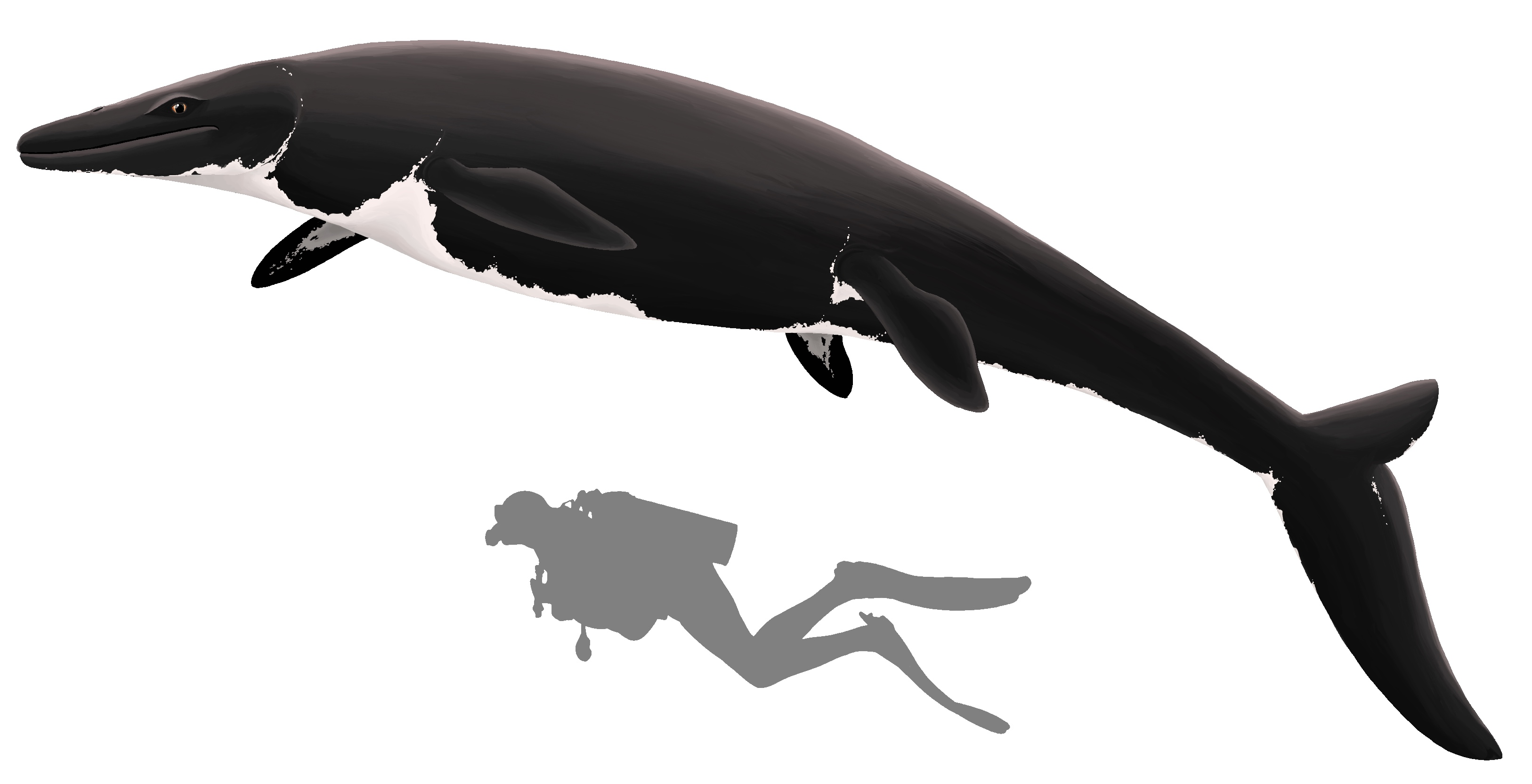
Life restoration

Plesiotylosaurus was a relatively large mosasaur. The holotype, LACM 2759, consists of a poorly preserved and partially distorted yet almost complete skull and mandibles collected from the Panoche Hills in the Moreno Formation, California. The lower jaw of the holotype skull measures 98 cm (3.22 ft) in length, which would give the whole animal an estimated length of about 6 m (20 ft). The jaws of Plesiotylosaurus were elongated and its skull was quite robust, similar to Prognathodon, which suggests a distinct prey preference.

Lindgren (2009) did a comprehensive study on the cranial osteology of Plesiotylosaurus based on the holotype skull, LACM 2759, and another recently described cranial specimen, UCMP 137249. Though obviously closely related to Prognathodon and firmly placed within the Mosasaurinae, the skull of Plesiotylosaurus does have certain characteristics otherwise only found in the Tylosaurinae. These characteristics include having a solid, bony, rostrum at the tip of the snout and mandibles, a wide and virtually unconstricted internarial bar that arises from a transversely rectangular base on the posterior face of the dentigerous portion of the premaxilla, a maxillo-premaxillary suture that forms a relatively long junction between the tooth-bearing bones of the upper jaw, an anterior postorbitofrontal process that forms a broadly overlapping flange beneath the supraorbital wing of the prefrontal and an anterior mandibular channel that is developed into a long and narrow slit. Lindgren considered these shared characteristics to be an obvious example of convergent evolution.

Lindgren (2009) also provided an emended diagnosis for the genus as follows:

Outline of holotype skull

"Skull large and elongate but with relatively short postpineal segment. Conical predental rostrum in front of first pair of premaxillary teeth. Anterior portion of internarial bar wide and subrectangular. Marginal tooth crowns labiolingually flattened and covered with faintly faceted and finely crenulated enamel. Frontal invaded by posterior end of external nares. Prefrontal forms large portion of posterolateral border of naris. Supraorbital wing of prefrontal triangular and broadly overlapped ventrally by postorbitofrontal. Prefrontal-postorbitofrontal contact distal to lateral edge of frontal. Dorsal surface of postorbitofrontal wide. Parietal foramen small and located close to fronto-parietal suture. Parietal table transversely narrow. Sagittal ramus of parietal hour-glass-shaped in dorsal view. Anteriorly situated pterygoid teeth approaching marginal teeth in size. Quadrate with fused suprastapedial and infrastapedial processes. Distinct projection of dentary anterior to first dentary tooth. Coronoid concave above, posterior wing with medial C-shaped excavation. Deep longitudinal sulcus on medial face of surangular. Cervicals with reniform central articulations and prominent zygosphenes and zygantra. Dental formula: 4 teeth in premaxilla, 12–13 teeth in maxilla, 16 teeth in dentary, and, at least, 8 teeth in pterygoid."

== Classification ==
Plesiotylosaurus is most frequently recovered as a mosasaurine mosasaur sharing close relations with the genus Prognathodon. Indeed, the morphology of the skull of Plesiotylosaurus is amazingly similar to that of Prognathodon and had it not been for the prominent premaxillary rostrum of Plesiotylosaurus, the subrectangular internarial bar and the distinctive predental prow on the dentary, they could be seen as congeneric.

The cladogram below is modified from Aaron R. H. Leblanc, Michael W. Caldwell and Nathalie Bardet, 2012 and showcases the relations between Plesiotylosaurus and the rest of the Mosasaurinae:

- Mosasaurinae
  - Dallasaurus turneri
  - - - Clidastes liodontus
      - Clidastes moorevillensis
      - Clidastes propython
    - - "Prognathodon" kianda
      - - Globidens alabamaensis
        - Globidens dakotensis
        - - Mosasaurini
            - Eremiasaurus heterodontus
            - - Plotosaurus bennisoni
              - - Mosasaurus conodon
                - Mosasaurus hoffmanni
                - Mosasaurus missouriensis
          - - "Prognathodon" rapax
            - - Plesiotylosaurus crassidens
              - - Prognathodon overtoni
                - - Prognathodon saturator
                  - - Prognathodon waiparaensis
                    - - Prognathodon solvayi
                      - Prognathodon currii
