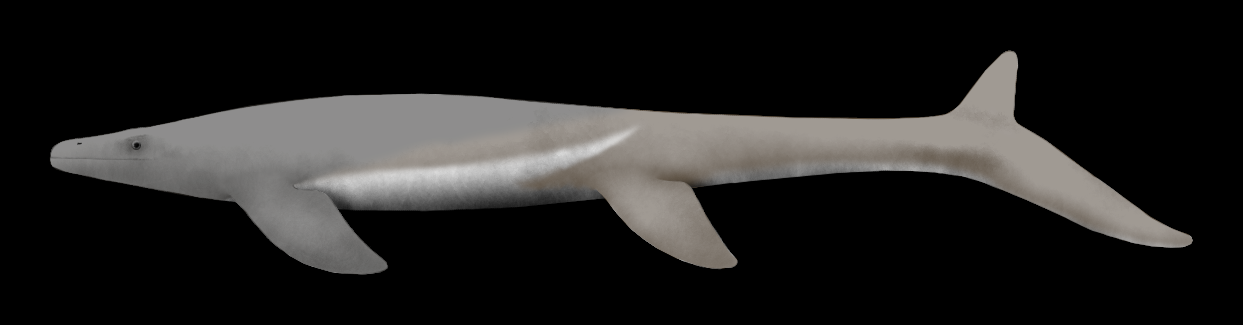
- Life restoration

Scientific classification
- Kingdom: Animalia
- Phylum: Chordata
- Class: Reptilia
- Order: Squamata
- Clade: †Mosasauria
- Family: †Mosasauridae
- Tribe: †Mosasaurini
- Genus: †Eremiasaurus; LeBlanc et al., 2012

Type species
- †Eremiasaurus heterodontus LeBlanc et al., 2012

= Eremiasaurus =

Eremiasaurus Temporal range: Late Cretaceous, Maastrichtian, 70.6–66 Ma

Extinct genus of lizards

Eremiasaurus ("desert lizard") is a genus of mosasaurs, an extinct group of marine reptiles, who lived during the Maastrichtian stage of the Late Cretaceous. The first known fossils of this taxon were teeth discovered in the Ouled Abdoun Basin in Morocco, and described in 1952 by Camille Arambourg as coming from Mosasaurus. However, it was in 2012 that Aaron R. H. LeBlanc and his colleagues described the only known species, E. heterodontus, from two more or less complete skeletons that had been discovered in the same geological area as the teeth originally described by Arambourg. Subsequently, fossil teeth discovered in Israel, Brazil, and the Ganntour Basin in Morocco were subsequently attributed to the genus.

It is a relatively small mosasaurid, with the syntype specimens suggesting a size of around 5 m (16 ft) long. The animal's skull is robust and is characterized by its very pronounced heterodonty (hence its specific epithet), a trait rarely observed in others mosasaurs. This particular dentition leaves it unclear what prey the animal consumed. The anatomy of the caudal vertebrae of Eremiasaurus suggests that it would have been a predator capable of swimming at high speed. Eremiasaurus lived in the southern margin of the Mediterranean Tethys. This paleo-ocean had a significant diversity of aquatic vertebrates and had a temperate and warm oceanic climate. The fossil record also shows that there would have been niche partitioning between Eremiasaurus and the various other mosasaur species identified within the Ouled Abdoun Basin.

== Research history ==
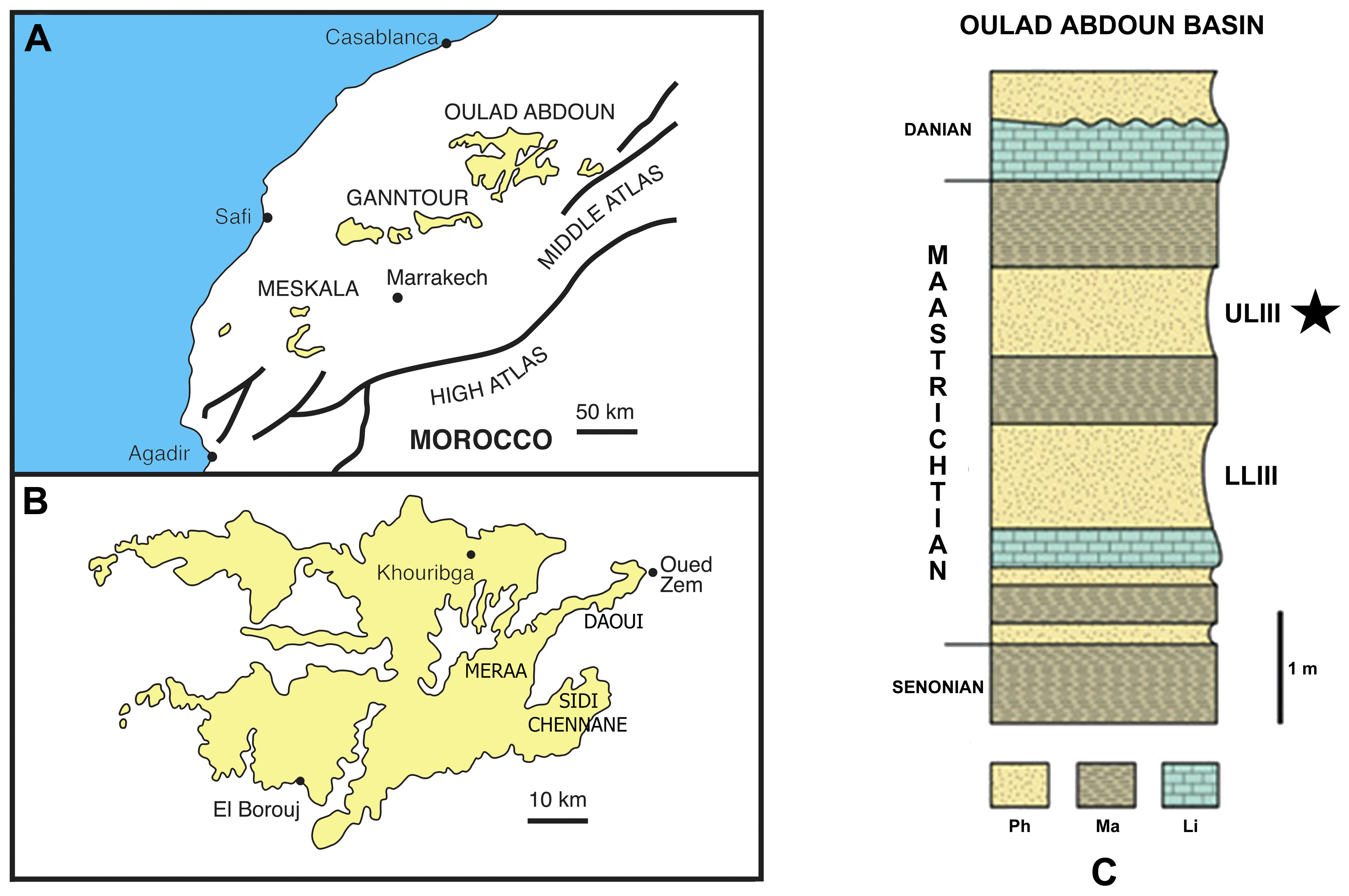
Map of the Ouled Abdoun basin and other major phosphate basins of Morocco shown in yellow. The Upper Couche III, the area from which the syntypes of Eremiasaurus were discovered, is illustrated by the black star at the top right of the table opposite

The phosphate deposits of the Ouled Abdoun Basin in Morocco have been known since the beginning of the 20th century to yield various fossils of numerous aquatic vertebrates dating from the Maastrichtian stage of the Upper Cretaceous. In a work published in 1952, Camille Arambourg carried out a broad revision of this area, where he described a certain number of these same fossil vertebrates. Among them, he describes a mosasaur taxon under the name Mosasaurus (Leiodon) cf. anceps, based on numerous fossil teeth of different morphologies. It is now accepted that the smaller, slender teeth formerly referred to this taxon actually belong to Eremiasaurus, while the larger ones would likely have belonged to his contemporary Thalassotitan.

In 2012, paleontologists Aaron R. H. LeBlanc, Michael W. Caldwell and Nathalie Bardet officially described Eremiasaurus heterodontus on the basis of two specimens discovered within the phosphate deposits of the Ouled Abdoun Basin in Morocco, and more precisely in the area of Sidi Daoui, located near the town of Oued Zem. The syntypes, cataloged UALVP 51744 and OCP DEK/GE 112 respectively, are two more or less complete specimens representing almost the entire known skeleton of the genus. The rationale for using syntypes rather than a single holotype comes from the fact that UALVP 51744, the most complete specimen, is derived from the commercial field without precise locality data. However, OCP DEK/GE 112 was exhumed by one of the describers, Nathalie Bardet, allowing its detailed geographic and stratigraphic position to be recorded. The precise zone concerning this discovery is located at the level of Upper Couche III, dating from the Upper Maastrichtian of the Late Cretaceous, an area where other mosasaurids have been found, including Mosasaurus beaugei and Thalassotitan atrox. The genus name Eremiasaurus comes from the Ancient Greek ἐρημία (eremia, "desert") and σαῦρος (saûros, "lizard"), a portmanteau literally meaning "desert lizard", in reference to the arid climate of present-day Morocco where the marine reptile was discovered. The specific epithet heterodontus also comes from the Ancient Greek ἕτερος (heteros, "different") and ὀδόντος (odóntos, "tooth"), together meaning "different teeth". This is a reference to the very visible heterodonty on the animal's jaws, which is an unusual trait for a mosasaur.

Later articles, including one published the same year as the genus was described, mention that specimens referred to Eremiasaurus were also discovered in geological formations of Brazil and Israel, which correspond to the same latitude and time period as that of Ouled Abdoun basin. In 2014, Henri Cappetta and his colleagues reported the presence of fossil teeth of Eremiasaurus in the Ganntour Basin, still in Morocco, occupying all the Maastrichtian stratigraphic series.

== Description ==
Like other derived mosasaurs, Eremiasaurus is an animal with a fully aquatic lifestyle. As such, it had a streamlined body, an elongated tail ending with a downturn supporting a two-lobed fin, and two pairs of flippers. The syntypes of Eremiasaurus indicate a rather average size for a mosasaurid. The most complete specimen, UALVP 51744, is 4.5 m (15 ft) long, with the skull measuring 63.5 cm (25.0 in), but the absence of several dorsal vertebrae suggests that the actual body length would have been closer to 5 m (16 ft). The second specimen, OCP DEK/GE 112, was first estimated to reach 6 m (20 ft) in length, based on observation of the larger skull, measuring 70 cm (28 in). However, a review of mosasaurids from Morocco conducted by Bardet and colleagues in 2015 reduced the proposed size for this specimen to 5 m (16 ft).

=== Skull and teeth ===
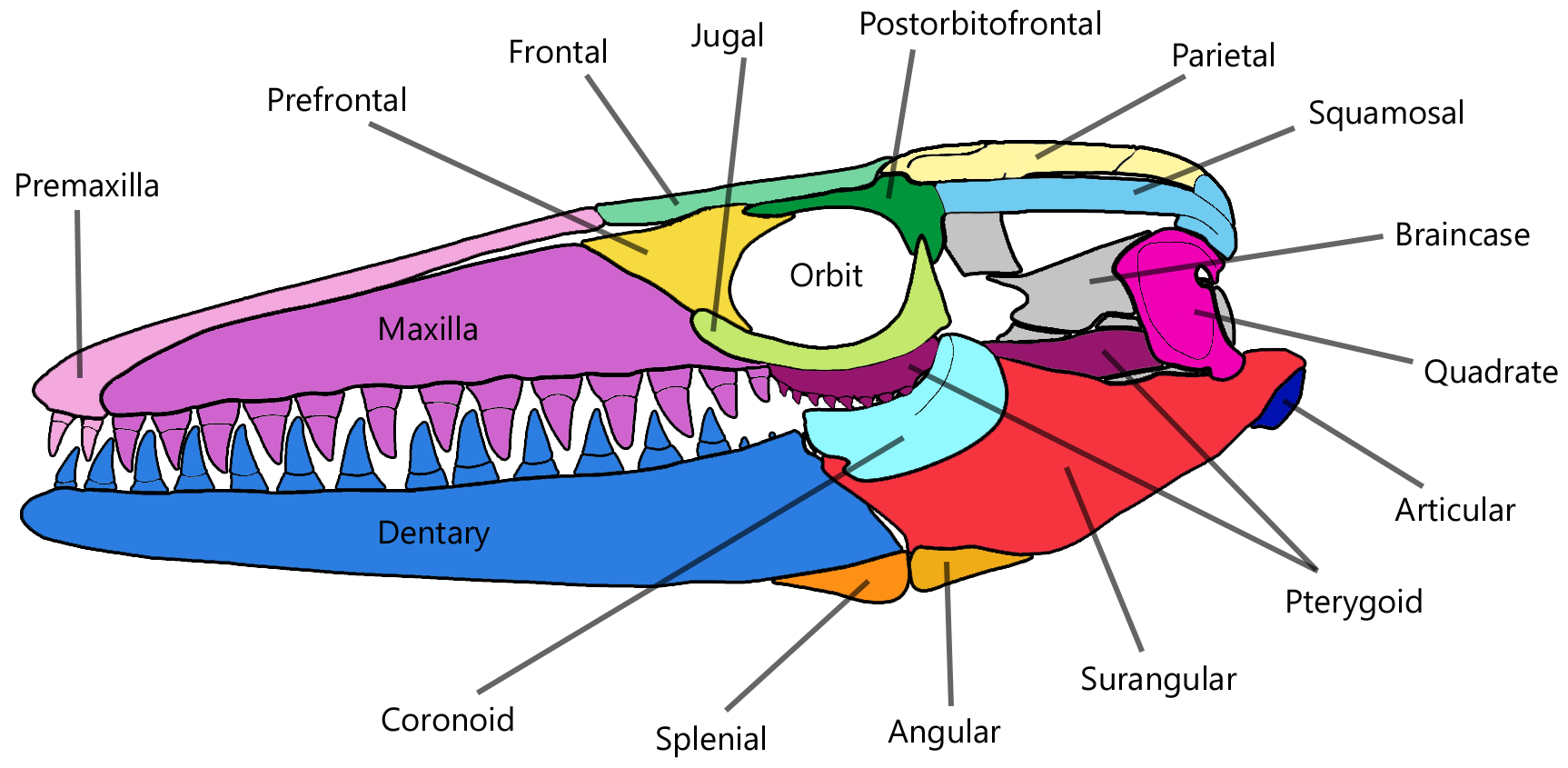
Annotated schematic of a Mosasaurus skull, a close relative of Eremiasaurus

The skull of Eremiasaurus has a robust build, but to the extreme seen in the related genus Prognathodon. The rostrum is short and conical in dorsal view and extends slightly beyond the frontmost teeth. Above the gum line in both jaws, a single row of small pits called foramina is aligned in parallel, serving to hold the terminal branches of the jaw nerves. In the maxilla, these foramina tend to increase in size further back. The preorbital part is slightly larger than half the total length of the skull and the frontal region is enlarged. The lateral surface of the prefrontal is concave and has a broad, flat dorsal surface for contact with the overlapping frontal and maxilla. Posterior to the end of the premaxillary-maxillary suture, the internarial bar (the long part of the premaxilla extending behind the teeth of this bone) is laterally constricted and has a prominent median dorsal keel (raised ridge) extending along the posterior half. The infrastapedial and suprastapedial processes of the quadrate are fused, possessing a very large and rounded stapedial fossa, the latter being one of the autapomorphies of the species.

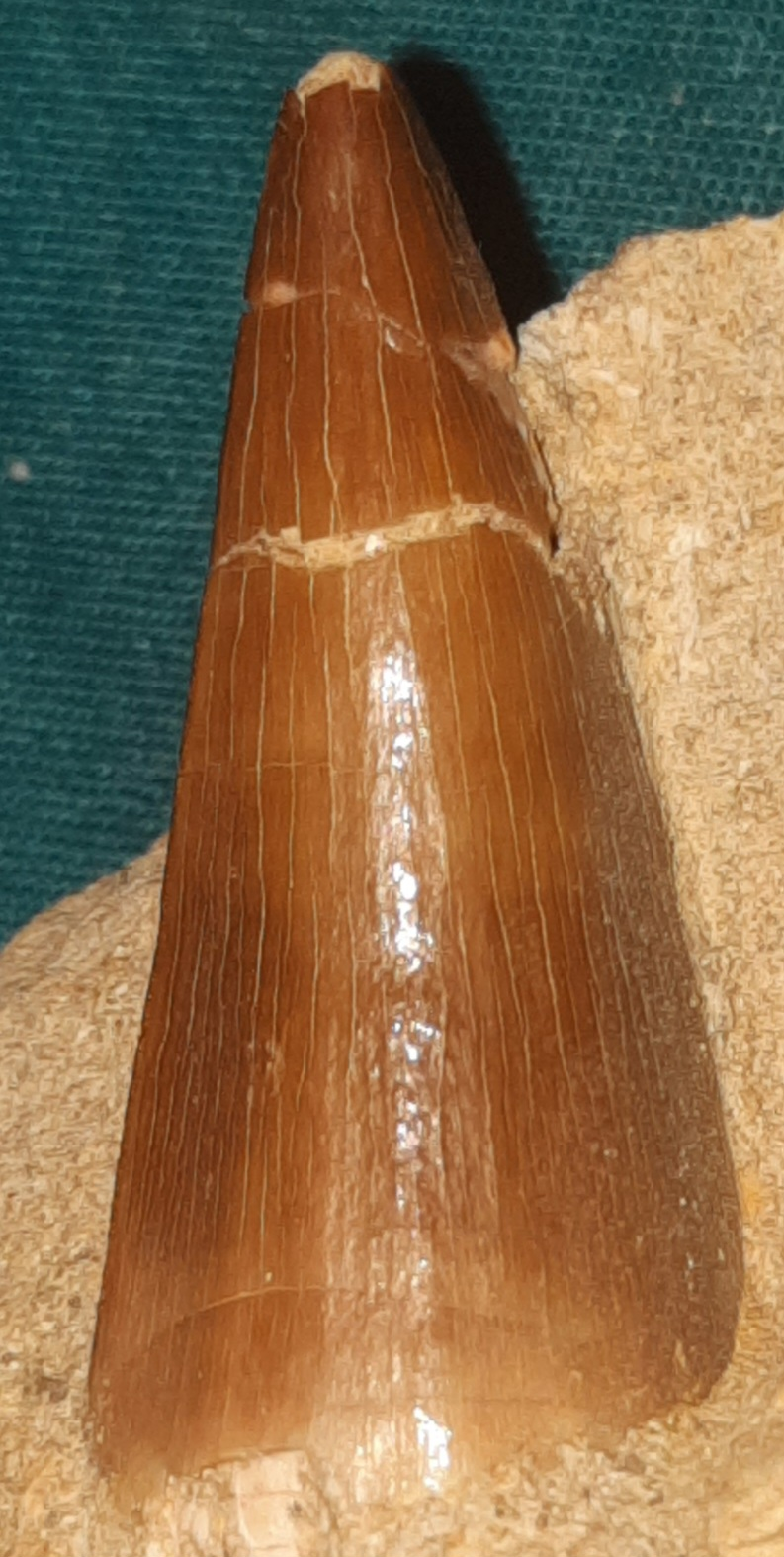
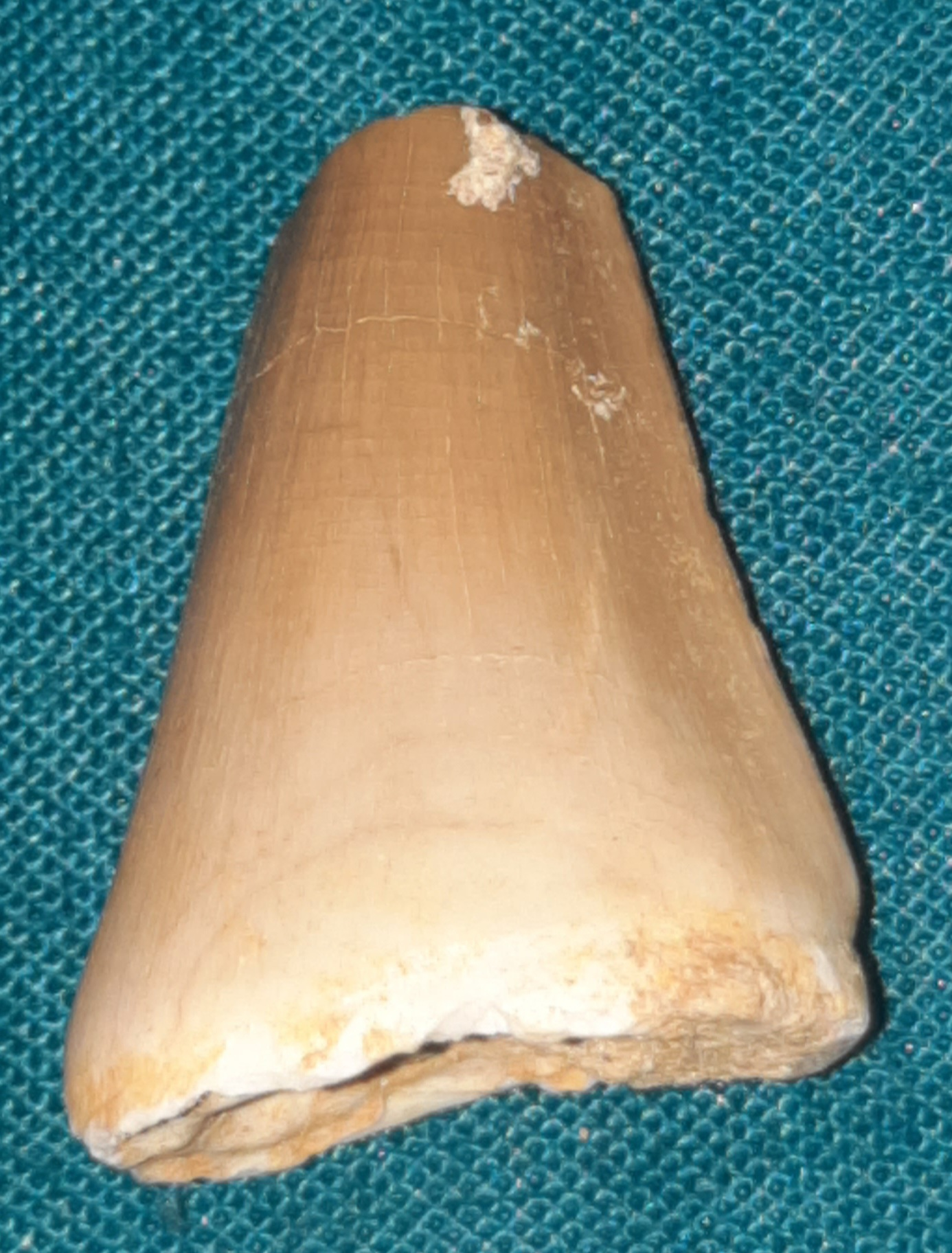
Teeth of E. heterodontus from Morocco

The lower jaw is thin compared to the size of the teeth lodged along the dentary. The dorsal margin of the dentary is slightly convex in lateral view. This convexity is not as pronounced as in most Prognathodon species and rather resembles that in Mosasaurus and P. kianda. The coronoid bears a large posterior process oriented vertically, which gives the dorsal margin of the bone an angle of nearly 90° between the horizontal anterior end and the vertical hind wing. The articular bones form broad rectangular extensions of the lower jaws behind the glenoid fossae. An exceptional case among mosasaurs, Eremiasaurus seems to have a hyoid bone, an element rarely found in the fossils of representatives of this group. This bone is slightly widened in its posterior part.

Eremiasaurus has one tooth in the premaxillae, twelve to thirteen teeth in the maxillae, fifteen teeth in the dentary bones, and an unknown number of teeth in the pterygoid bones. The taxon is characterized by its very marked heterodonty, with the teeth differing in many points in the jaws by their shape and size. The only other known mosasaur to have such an attribute is the possible tylosaurine Kaikaifilu, also dating from the late Maastrichtian, but from present-day Antarctica. In the anterior part of the jaws, the teeth are straight and conical in shape. Towards the middle, the teeth are blade-shaped, laterally compressed, and have serrated carinae (cutting edges) at both the front and back. In the posterior part of the jaws, the teeth are asymmetrical and have smooth enamel. The pterygoid teeth become increasingly curved backward. In the anterior part of the snout, the teeth of the upper and lower jaws come into close contact with each other, leaving interdental traces in the bones between the adjacent teeth crowns.

=== Postcranial skeleton ===
The exact number of vertebrae in Eremiasaurus is unknown. The most complete specimen, UALVP 51744, lacks many of the dorsal and caudal vertebrae but preserves the cervical column. But excluding this, some vertebrae and other postcranial parts of the animal are well preserved and allow to visualize it as a whole. The ribs get smaller posteriorly, with the ribs numerous and wide on the first and second dorsals before becoming short and thin. Several large thoracic ribs hide the dorsal margin of the scapular blade in lateral view, obscuring the arch formed by the dorsal edge of the scapula.

Eremiasaurus' caudal vertebrae are most similar to Plotosaurus. Among the most notable features are the presence of a ventral deviation of the tail, a fanning of the caudal neural spines, and an unusually long series of pygal (modified sacral) vertebrae. The large number of pygal vertebrae, accompanied by a reduced number of intermediate caudals is unique to Eremiasaurus. The presence of a ventral tail deflection, as in Plotosaurus, and a wide range of neural spines in the same region of the caudal vertebral series suggest a similar development of an incipient dorsal fin lobe in Eremiasaurus, though less developed. These changes in proportions, such as an increase in the number of pygal vertebrae, suggest a high-speed pursuit predator, converging with the vertebral proportions of Plotosaurus.

The scapula and coracoid appear to be sutured tightly anterior to the glenoid fossa. This same pit is also slightly domed, another distinctive feature of the taxon. Posterior to this fossa the posterior edge of the scapula extends dorsally before extending to form the posterior margin of the scapular blade, similar to Clidastes. The lateral aspect of the scapula is wide, smooth and flat. The humerus is subequal in height and width, unlike Mosasaurus and Plotosaurus, where they are wider than they are tall. Like all mosasaurids, the iliac crest is reduced to a forward-leaning cylindrical process. The distal end of the ilium is enlarged and bears facets for articulation with the pubis and ischium. The tibia is a rectangular element, longer proximally than anteroposteriorly. The fibula is bell-shaped, with the distal end being much wider than the proximal end, unlike Mosasaurus and Plotosaurus, where both ends of the fibula are of less width. This bone is also about three-quarters the length of the tibia, unlike Tylosaurus and Platecarpus, in which the fibula is the same length as the tibia. The largest of the known elements of the tarsus is interpreted to be an astragalus. This bone is kidney-shaped, with a pedunculated fibular facet on the dorsal side. The phalanges are elongated spindle-shaped with moderately enlarged epiphyses, different from the stout, block-like proportions seen in Mosasaurus and Plotosaurus.

== Classification ==
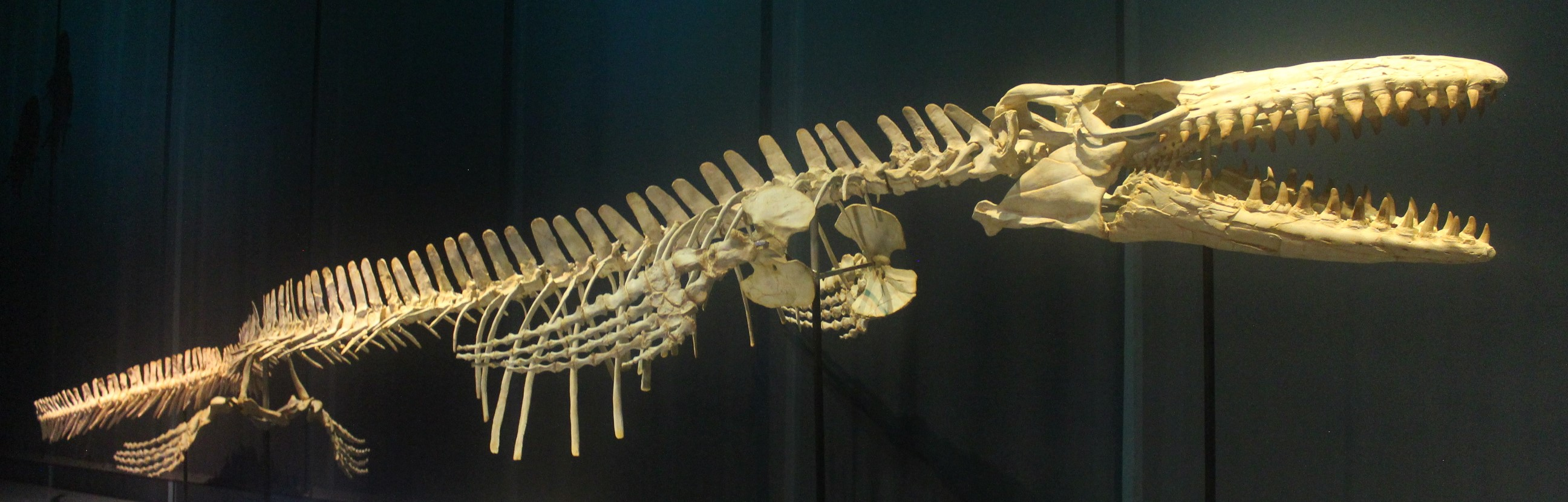
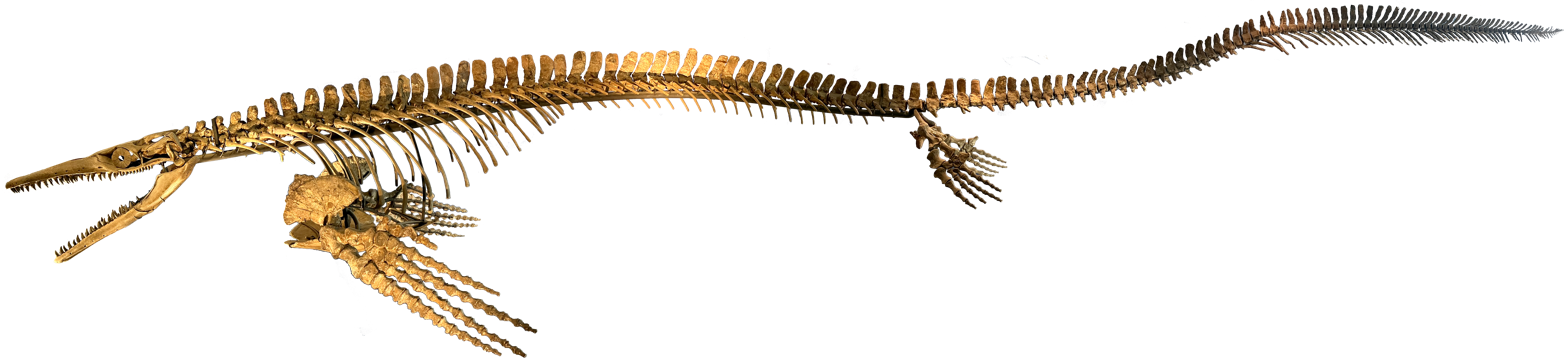
Eremiasaurus is a mosasaurid which is placed in the tribe Mosasaurini, alongside the genera Mosasaurus (shown above, depicted with the contemporaneous species M. beaugei) and Plotosaurus (below)

In one of the several cladograms present in the formal description of the taxon conducted by LeBlanc and colleagues in 2012, Eremiasaurus was placed as a sister group to the tribe Plotosaurini. Plotosaurini is a taxon that was first erected in 1967 by Dale Russell in his scientific work entitled Systematics and morphology of American mosasaurs, from which he revised most North American mosasaurids. The validity of this tribe begins to be questioned from 1997, the year from which the phylogenetic revision of the Mosasauroidea led by Gorden L. Bell Jr. was officially published, considering it polyphyletic and therefore obsolete. The study by LeBlanc et al. (2012) argued that, although not necessarily invalid, dropping Mosasaurini would not follow the general principle of type genus carried over to all ranks in a classification hierarchy, and that the original diagnoses of Plotosaurini are now obsolete. The authors therefore proposed to synonymize the taxon Plotosaurini to Mosasaurini, and place Eremiasaurus in a clade containing Mosasaurus and Plotosaurus based on various cranial characteristics, notably via the crest present on the internal bar. The validity of Mosasaurini will be immediately accepted, and the placement of Eremiasaurus as proposed by LeBlanc and colleagues in 2012 will be maintained in various subsequent studies.

A 2017 phylogenetic analysis of the mosasauroids used several analyses to find the most valid classifications, as if a grouping was consistently recorded it was likely a true one. Most phylogenetic trees found Eremaisaurus to be within Mosasaurini, even after refinements were made by a later study. Below is the cladogram from the most recent major phylogenetic analysis of the Mosasaurinae subfamily by Madzia & Cau (2017), which was self-described as a refinement of a larger study by Simões et al. (2017):

- Mosasaurinae
  - Dallasaurus turneri
  - - Clidastes liodontus
    - - Clidastes moorevillensis
      - - Clidastes propython
        - - Mosasaurini
            - - - - Prognathodon overtoni
                  - Prognathodon rapax
                - - - - Prognathodon saturator
                      - - Prognathodon currii
                        - Prognathodon solvayi
                  - - Prognathodon waiparaensis
                    - - Prognathodon kianda
                      - Eremiasaurus heterodontus
            - - Plesiotylosaurus crassidens
              - - Mosasaurus conodon
                - - Mosasaurus missouriensis
                  - - Mosasaurus hoffmannii
                    - Plotosaurus bennisoni
          - Globidensini
            - Globidens dakotensis
            - Globidens alabamaensis

== Paleoecology ==
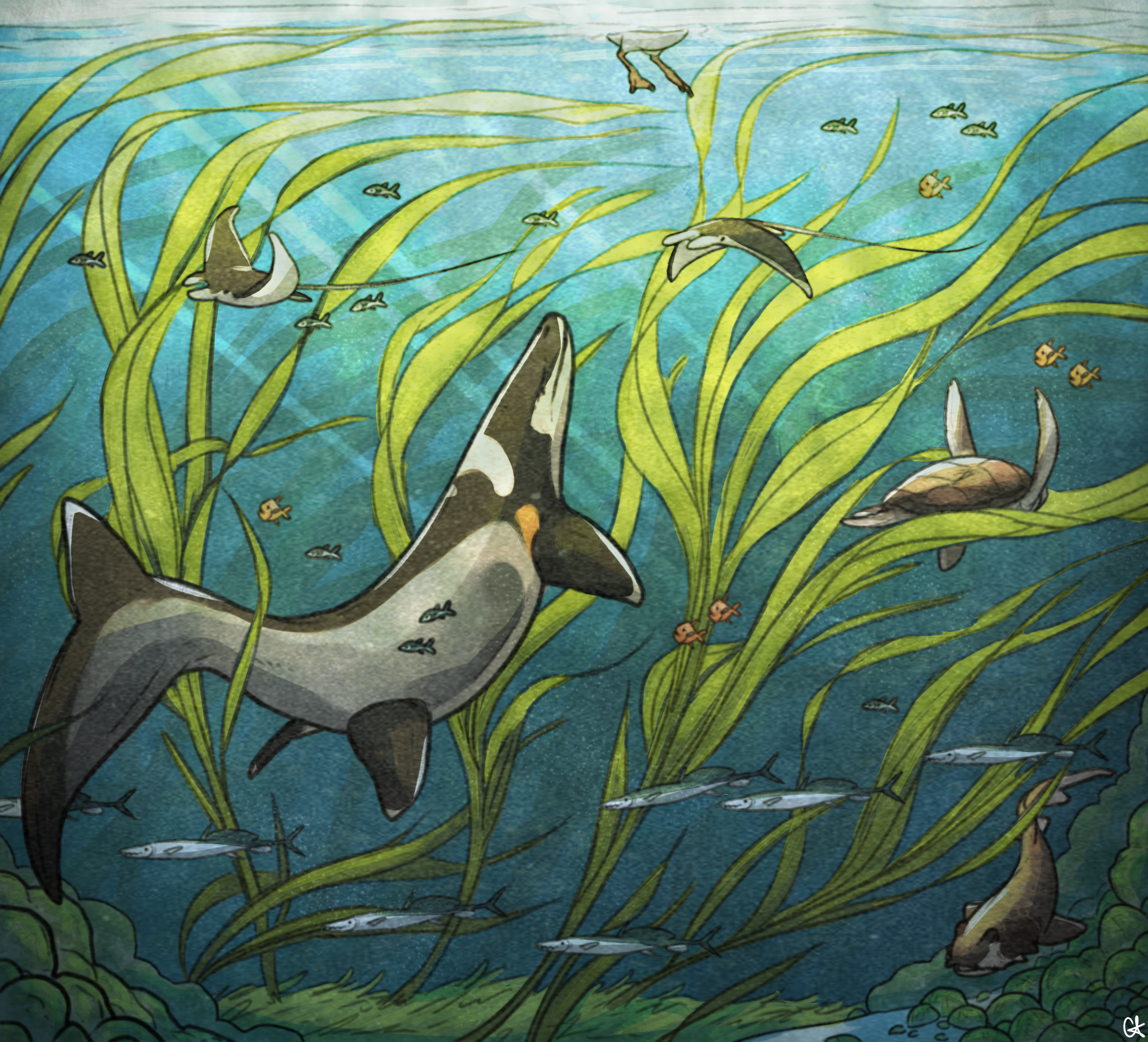
Life restoration of the marine fauna in the Ouled Abdoun basin during the Upper Cretaceous

The deposits of the Ouled Abdoun Basin in Morocco constituted during the Maastrichtian a large part of what was once the southern margin of the Mediterranean Tethys. Located along the equator, between 20°N and 20°S, the temperate climates were warmer than the northern margin of the paleo-ocean, which was located between 30–40°N. This place is represented by a great diversity of aquatic vertebrates, including various bony fishes like Enchodus and Stratodus to cartilaginous fishes like Cretalamna, Squalicorax and Rhombodus. The precise locality from which Eremiasaurus was discovered was already known to have a high number of other mosasaurs, with more than ten genera identified within the Ouled Abdoun Basin. The highly differentiated dental anatomy within the taxa suggests that niche partitioning occurred, in which predators occupied different niches to avoid competition with each other. For example, some mosasaurs identified within this area, such as Globidens and Carinodens, have blunt teeth for crushing shellfish, while mosasaurs such as Mosasaurus, Thalassotitan, and Prognathodon have specialized dentitions for hunting larger prey. Although the particular diet of Eremiasaurus is uncertain, its divergence from other stout-toothed mosasaurines would suggest that it specialized in food sources not exploited by its larger Moroccan contemporaries. Other marine squamates are known there, including the sea monitor Pachyvaranus and possibly the sea snake Palaeophis. Many sea turtles of the Bothremydidae family have been identified. Plesiosaurs, with the exception of Zarafasaura, are rarely present within the locality.

== See also ==
- Mosasaurus
- Plotosaurus
