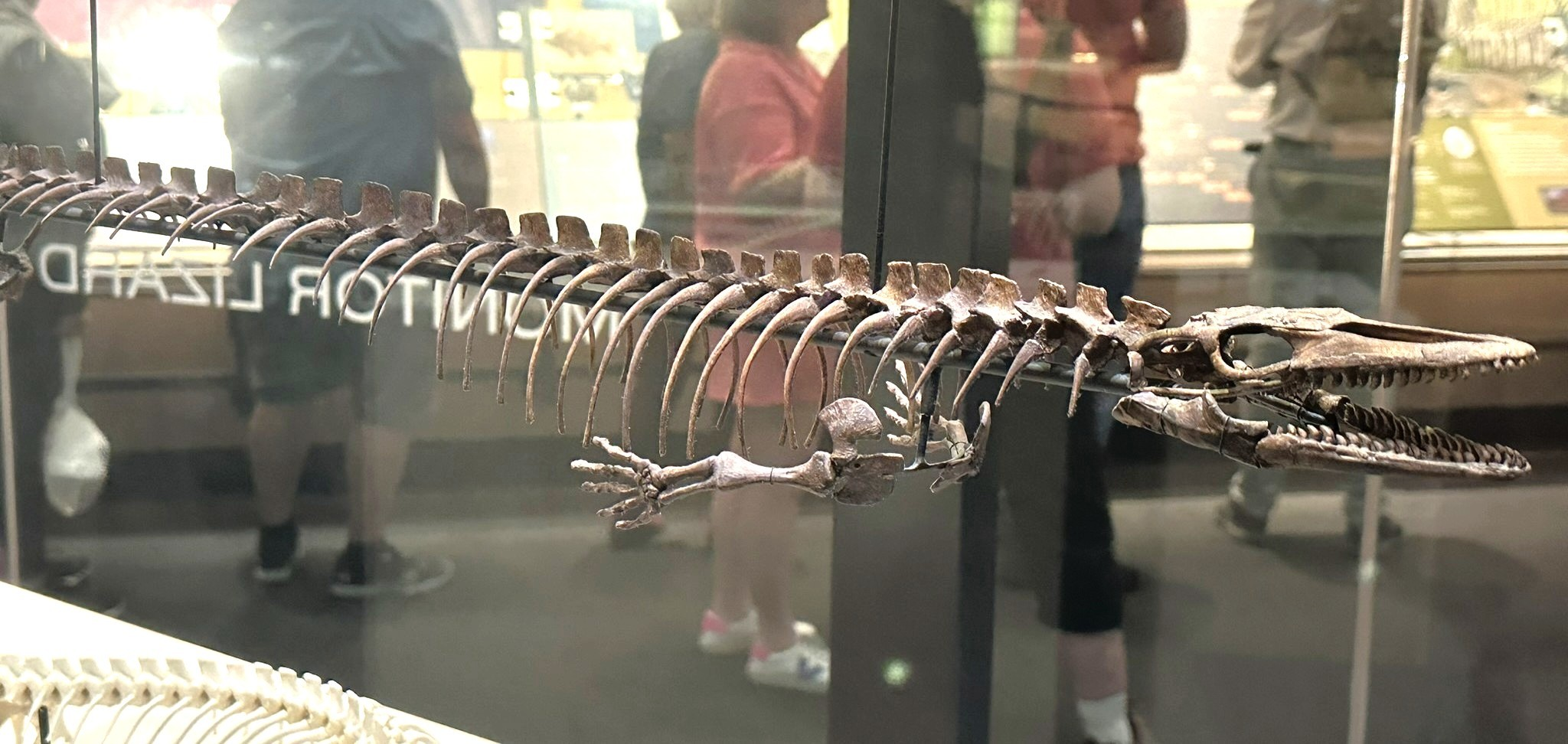
- Reconstructed skeleton at the Perot Museum

Scientific classification
- Kingdom: Animalia
- Phylum: Chordata
- Class: Reptilia
- Order: Squamata
- Clade: †Mosasauria
- Family: †Mosasauridae
- Subfamily: †Mosasaurinae
- Genus: †Dallasaurus; Polcyn et Bell, 2005

Species
- Dallasaurus turneri (type)

= Dallasaurus =

Dallasaurus Temporal range: Late Cretaceous (Turonian), 93.9–89.8 Ma

Extinct genus of reptiles

Dallasaurus ("Dallas lizard") is a basal mosasauroid from the Upper Cretaceous of North America. Along with Russellosaurus, Dallasaurus is one of the two oldest mosasauroid taxa currently known from North America. It is also one of the smallest known mosasaurines, measuring approximately 1 m (3.3 ft) in length.

== Specimens ==
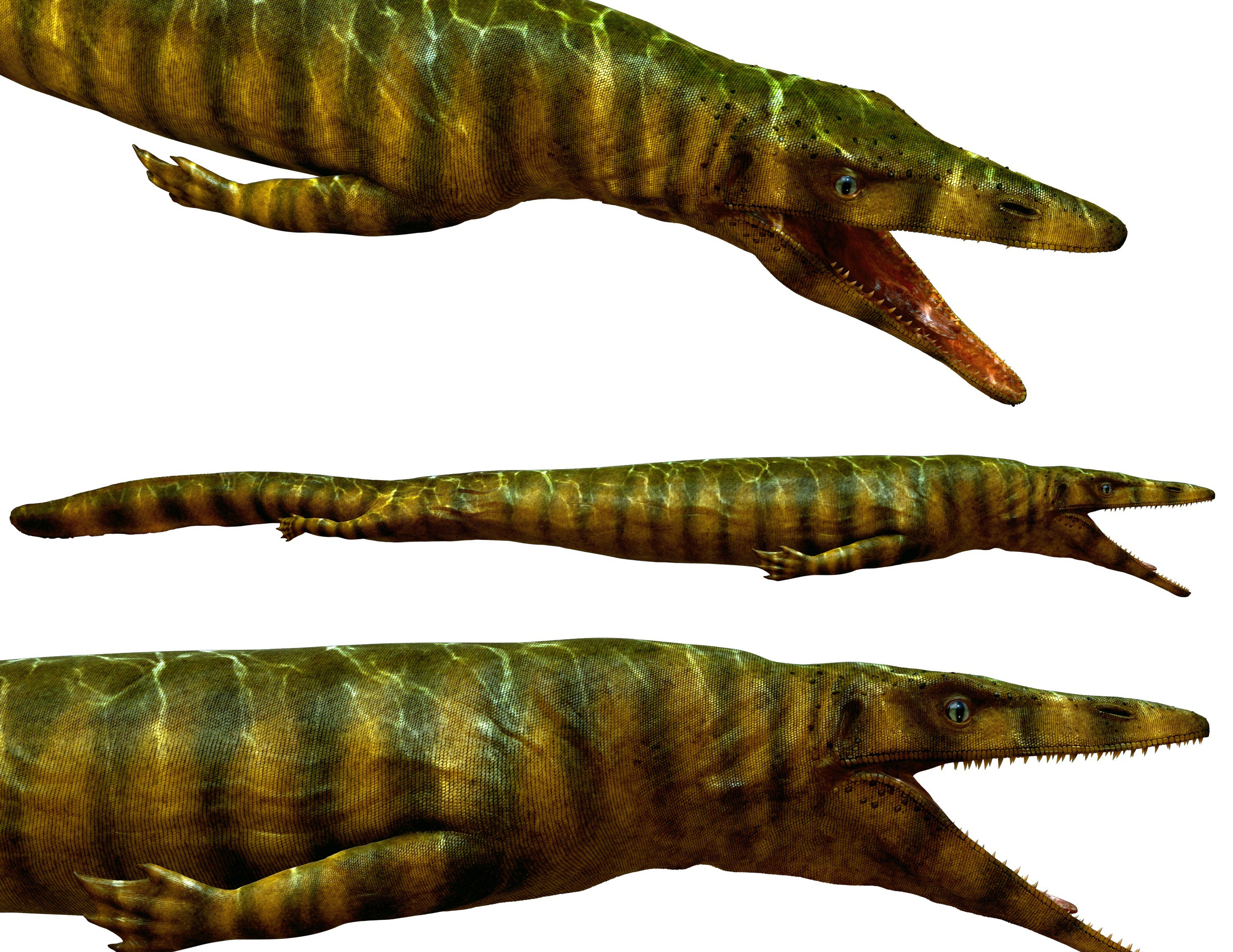
CGI restoration

The genus is based upon two partial skeletons recovered from the Arcadia Park Shale (lower Middle Turonian), approximately 15 meters above its contact with the older Kamp Ranch Limestone in Dallas County in north-central Texas.

The holotype specimen (TxVP 43209-1, Texas Vertebrate Paleontology Collections, University of Texas at Austin) consists of an incomplete and disarticulated skull, along with considerable portions of the postcranial skeleton, making up about 80 percent of the animal. The second referred specimen (DMNH 8121-8125, 8143-8149, and 8161-8180, Dallas Museum of Natural History) lacks any skull material and consists entirely of disarticulated postcranial remains. The strata containing these fossils were temporarily exposed during excavations for a housing development, and both sites have now been reburied by construction. The two specimens were discovered about 100 meters from one another; the first was found by an amateur collector, Van Turner, for whom the type species (Dallasaurus turneri) was named. The genus is named for Dallas County, where both specimens were found.

== Anatomy ==
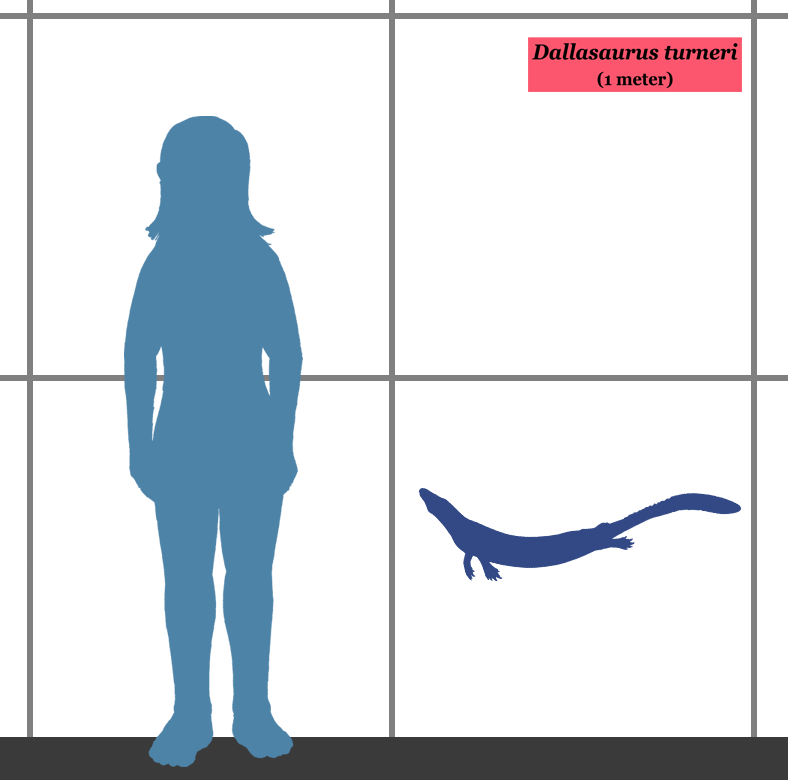
Estimated size, compared to a human.

Animated restoration

Polcyn and Bell diagnose Dallasaurus as follows: "Small, plesiopedal mosasauroid possessing the following autapomorphies: posterior maxillary teeth strongly recurved posteriorly, slightly inflated at the crown and bearing only posterior carinae that is slightly offset laterally; atlas neural arch mediolaterally compressed but not flattened at its base, condylar surfaces irregularly figure-eight shaped; cervical vertebra synapophyses protrude below the level of the ventral edge of the centrum; short, wide fossa excavated immediately below the ventral rim of the cotyle of at least one middle cervical vertebra; hypapophysis anteroventral edge terminating in short projections of irregular length; postglenoid process capped by bony epiphysis bearing a calcified cartilage apex."

Bell and Polcyn use the term "plesiopedal" to indicate a "conservative ecologically adaptive grade" characterized by "small size, slightly modified swimming tail and [a] relatively plesiomorphic limb condition" compared to more derived mosasauroids. Polcyn and Bell note that plesiopedal mosasauroids tend to be relatively small lizards possessing limbs in which the "propodial elements [equals humerus and femur] remain elongated, generally constituting one-half or more of the full length of the osseus limb", as compared to more derived "hydropedal" mosasaurs in which the propodial elements are stout and have been substantially shortened, constituting less than one-half of the full length of the ossueus limb. While hydropedal mosasaurs were probably entirely aquatic, plesiopedal mosasauroids were still capable of terrestrial locomotion and so likely lived an amphibious lifestyle.

== Classification ==
Bell and Polcyn have conducted a cladistic analysis of Dallasaurus, concluding that this taxon should be placed within the subfamily Mosasaurinae, "well within [the family] Mosasauridae", and that, despite its small size and the "primitive" condition of its limbs, it should not be placed within the paraphyletic family Aigialosauridae. Dallasaurus is the sister group to more derived mosasaurine mosasaurs such as Clidastes, Prognathodon, Mosasaurus, and Plotosaurus.

In the popular press, Dallasaurus has been hailed as a "missing link" uniting fully aquatic mosasaurs with their terrestrial ancestors.

== Sources ==
- G. L. Bell, Jr.; Polcyn, M. J. (2005). "Dallasaurus turneri, a new primitive mosasauroid from the Middle Turonian of Texas and comments on the phylogeny of the Mosasauridae (Squamata)." Netherlands Journal of Geoscience (Geologie en Mijnbouw) 84 (3) pp. 177–194.
