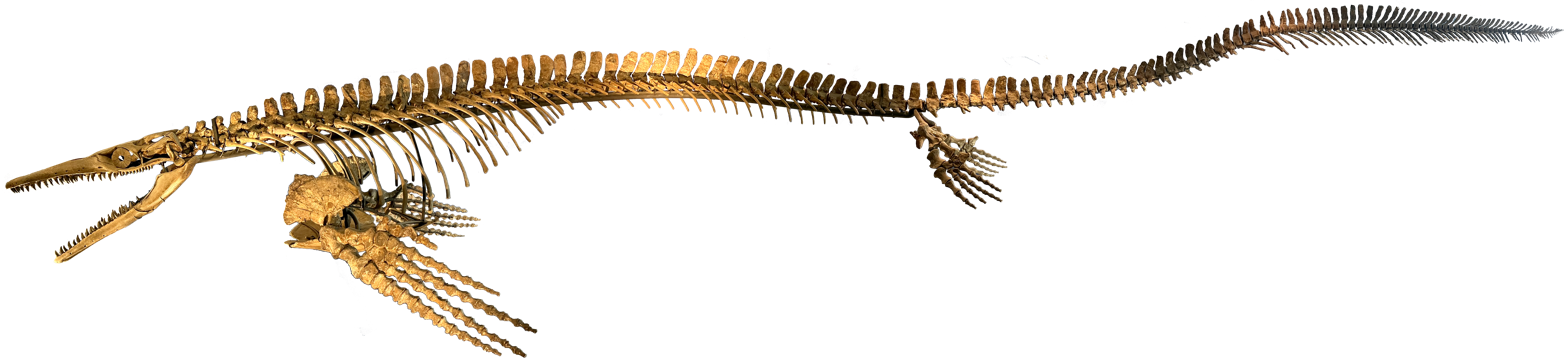
- Mounted skeleton (CIT 2750) at the Natural History Museum of Los Angeles County

Scientific classification
- Kingdom: Animalia
- Phylum: Chordata
- Class: Reptilia
- Order: Squamata
- Clade: †Mosasauria
- Family: †Mosasauridae
- Genus: †Plotosaurus; Camp, 1951
- Species: †P. bennisoni

Binomial name
- †Plotosaurus bennisoni (Camp, 1942)

Synonyms
- List of synonyms: Synonyms of genus; Kolposaurus Camp, 1942 (preoccupied); Garzasaurus Anderson, 1943 Synonyms of P. bennisoni; Kolposaurus tuckeri Camp, 1942; Plotosaurus tuckeri (Camp, 1942)

= Plotosaurus =

Plotosaurus Temporal range: Maastrichtian, ~70.6–66 Ma Possible late Campanian record.

Extinct genus of lizards

Plotosaurus ("swimmer lizard") is an extinct genus of large mosasaurs which lived during the Upper Cretaceous (Maastrichtian) in what is now North America. The taxon was initially described by Berkeley paleontologist Charles Lewis Camp in 1942 from several more or less complete fossil specimens discovered in California, USA. Originally named as Kolposaurus (meaning "bay lizard"), it was changed to Plotosaurus in 1951 when Camp discovered that the name had already been assigned to a type of nothosaur. Two species were historically assigned to the genus, but since 2008, only P. bennisoni has been recognized as valid.

Unlike other mosasaurids, Plotosaurus possesses a morphology converging with those of ichthyosaurs, suggesting a much more advanced swimming adaptation than some of its close relatives. It is these same adaptations that have led to its classification in a rather derived position within this group of marine reptiles. Although only known from North America, fragmentary specimens known from Japan that could possibly belong to the genus suggest that it may have had a wider distribution.

== Research history ==
The earliest Plotosaurus fossils were found in the northwestern regions of the San Joaquin Valley.

The earliest described specimens of Plotosaurus were discovered in the early 20th century from Moreno Formation deposits along the San Joaquin Valley, California. The first was a pair of caudal vertebrae collected during 1918 or 1920 by an Oakland resident named Herman G. Walker while exploring the Panoche Hills. They were donated to the University of California, Berkeley's Museum of Paleontology under the catalog UCMP 36050. In June 1936, a high school student from Gustine named Allan Bennison found three vertebrae next to a hadrosaur fossil in shale hills near Patterson, two of which he donated to UC Berkeley as UCMP 32943. Bennison was inspired to geology by his science teacher M. Merrill Thompson and continued to study the stratigraphy of surrounding hills. This would turn fruitful, as in 1937 he discovered a partial skeleton from grey sandstone hills near Pacheco Pass during a survey of Late Cretaceous beds in the Diablo Range. Bennison notified Thompson, and the two brought UC Berkeley paleontologists Samuel Paul Welles, Curtis J. Hesse, Owen J. Poe, and Thompson's students to excavate the find. The fossil consisted of a complete skull, eighteen articulated vertebrae, an interclavicle, four ribs, and rib fragments. It was curated to UC Berkeley's museum as UCMP 32778. In August of the same year, a second skeleton was collected by a joint UC Berkeley-California State University, Fresno party while excavating an elasmosaur fossil in the Panoche Hills around forty miles southeast of Bennison's skeleton. This skeleton, first found by Fresno State professor William M. Tucker, was far larger than Bennison's skeleton and consisted of an articulated series of fifty-four dorsal, pygal, and caudal vertebrae. It was sent to UC Berkeley as UCMP 33913. Field expeditions of the California Institute of Technology in Moreno Formation outcrops north of Coalinga between 1938 and 1940 uncovered three additional partial skeletons. The most complete, CIT 2750, consisted of a large skull, thirty-nine front vertebrae, a shoulder girdle, and front paddles, while the other two (CIT 2751 and 2755) preserved the mosasaurs' tails.

Cranial kinesis compared to Tylosaurus

The fossil skeletons came under the study of the UC Berkeley's Museum of Paleontology director Charles Lewis Camp, who published his research in 1942. In it, he recognized that they represent a new genus of mosasaur. Camp particularly noticed the highly derived aquatic adaptations that were far more specialized than other mosasaurs, calling it "the most advanced genus yet described in the family Mosasauridae." He named this genus Kolposaurus, a portmanteau of the Ancient Greek words κόλπος (kólpos, "bay") and σαῦρος (saûros, "lizard"), and the type species Kolposaurus bennisoni in honor of Bennison with UCMP 32778 as its holotype. Camp (1942) also identified a second species which he named Kolposaurus tuckeri after Tucker. Its holotype was the same skeleton discovered by its namesake (UCMP 33913), differentiated from K. bennisoni by its larger size (Note: Camp (1942) estimated the specimen to come from an animal "about two-thirds the size of the specimen of Tylosaurus dyspelor," referring to a Tylosaurus skeleton measuring 8.83 meters (29.0 ft) in length. This would correspond to a length of 5.89 meters (19.3 ft).) and more numerous pygal vertebrae. The Caltech skeletons were identified as K. tuckeri, albeit tentatively for CIT 2750. If its assignment was correct, this would have provided additional information to differentiate the species from K. bennisoni, namely in its less derived skull morphology as inferred by smaller and shorter nostrils, the frontal bone not being as extended backwards, less numerous pterygoid teeth, the quadrate being taller than it is wide, and a smaller pineal foramen; different counts of vertebrae bearing certain processes; and a larger interclavicle in proportion to the skull. In 1951, Camp discovered that the name Kolposaurus was preoccupied by a nothosaur, and so renamed the genus to Plotosaurus as a portmanteau of the Ancient Greek πλώτης (plôtes, "swimmer") and σαῦρος. A 2008 study by paleontologists Johan Lindgren, Michael Caldwell, and John Jagt redescribed Plotosaurus based on a reexamination of the specimens described by Camp (1942) and new fossils uncovered after it. They found that much of the traits thought to differentiate between the two species were actually shared, and the remaining distinct features were likely the result of intraspecific variation. This rendered P. tuckeri a junior synonym of P. bennisoni, making the genus monotypic.

All formal fossils of Plotosaurus are actually known from California only. However, fossils that could possibly belong to the genus have been discovered elsewhere in the world. In 2016, a fragmentary lower jaw discovered in the Quiriquina Formation, near Cocholgüe, Chile, was identified by Eberhard Frey and colleagues as coming from a Plotosaurus-like mosasaur. However, in 2019, Paulina Jiménez-Huidobro and her colleagues discovered that this attribution was erroneous because the fossil did not correspond to the genus diagnostics, the authors reidentifying it as possibly coming instead from a Halisaurus. In 2021, Taichi Kato and colleagues described two tail vertebrae from two separate localities in Ibaraki Prefecture, Japan, one from the Hiraiso Formation and the other from the lower Isoai Formation. The vertebrae are referred to as cf. Plotosaurus sp. because of their similar measurements to the California specimens.

== Description ==
Table comparing the sizes of Plotosaurus

The immature holotype of Plotosaurus with 46 cm (1.51 ft) long skull is estimated to have been 4.2 m (14 ft) long in total, while adults with 1 m (3.3 ft) long skull would have been larger. One specimen was estimated to have reached nearly 8 m (26 ft) long and weighed around 1,654 kg (3,646 lb).^{Extended Data 1} Plotosaurus possessed several adaptations to marine life not seen in other mosasaurs. Compared with their relatives, they had narrower flippers, large tail fins and a streamlined fusiform body shape. This design converges with the morphology and hydrodynamic build of ichthyosaurs. Some of the tail vertebrae are fused together; unlike in most mosasaurs this is not a pathological condition but another aquatic adaptation that allowed Plotosaurus to achieve a more efficient swimming design. Altogether, Plotosaurus possessed the highest level of aquatic adaptations in any mosasaur.

These features probably enabled them to also be one of the fastest of the mosasaurs. They also had relatively large eyes for keen eyesight, and impressions found with their fossils suggest that they had scaly skin.

== Classification ==
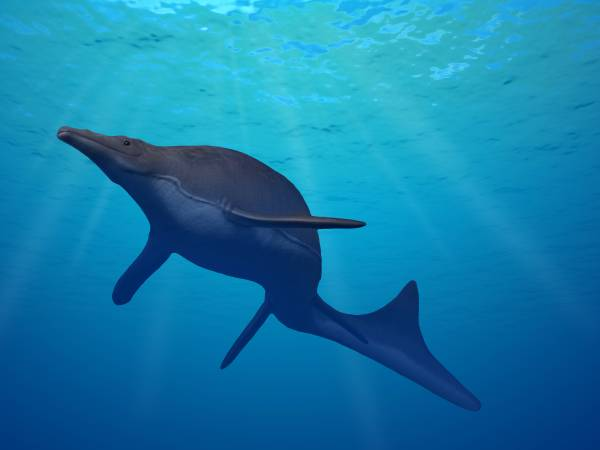
Life restoration

Based on cladistic analysis, Plotosaurus is considered to be the most derived branch of mosasaur evolution.

== See also ==
- List of mosasaur genera
- Timeline of mosasaur research
