= Hondita Formation =

Fossiliferous geological formation of the Colombian Andes

- Stratigraphic range: Turonian; ~93–90 Ma
- Type: Geological formation
- Unit of: Güagüaquí Group
- Underlies: Loma Gorda Formation
- Overlies: not observed
- Thickness: up to 90 m (300 ft)

Lithology
- Primary: Sandy limestone, shale
- Other: Calcareous concretions

Location
- Coordinates: 4°30′47″N 74°52′32″W
- Approximate paleocoordinates: 3.0°S 52.0°W
- Region: Upper Magdalena Valley, Central & Eastern Ranges, Andes
- Country: Colombia

Type section
- Named for: Quebrada Hondita
- Named by: De Porta
- Location: Piedras, Tolima
- Year defined: 1966
- Coordinates: 4°30′47″N 74°52′32″W
- Region: Cundinamarca, Huila, Tolima
- Country: Colombia
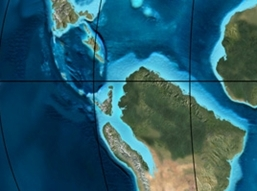
- Paleogeography of Northern South America; 90 Ma, by Ron Blakey

The Hondita Formation (Spanish: Formación Hondita, Ksh) is a fossiliferous geological formation of the Upper Magdalena Valley (VSM) and surrounding Central and Eastern Ranges of the Colombian Andes, extending from Cundinamarca in the north to Huila and easternmost Tolima in the south. The lowermost unit of the Güagüaquí Group, a sequence of sandy limestones and shales, dates to the Late Cretaceous period; Turonian epoch, and has a maximum thickness of 90 metres (300 ft).

Fossils of Yaguarasaurus columbianus, said to be found in the time-equivalent La Frontera Formation (listed as "La Frontera Member"), were actually recovered from the Hondita Formation as the stratigraphic unit present in the Quebradas El Ocal and Itaibe, Huila.

== Etymology ==
The formation was named in 1966 by De Porta, named after Quebrada Hondita in Piedras, Tolima.

== Description ==
=== Lithologies ===
The Hondita Formation is characterised by a sequence of sandy limestones and shales with calcareous concretions up to 2 metres (6.6 ft) in diameter. The formation has provided fossils of Pachyrhizodus etayoi, Acanthoceras sp., Rhynchostreon sp. near Aipe, Huila.

=== Stratigraphy and depositional environment ===
The Hondita Formation is the lowermost unit of the Güagüaquí Group. It is overlain by the Loma Gorda Formation and its base has not been observed. The age has been estimated on the basis of ammonites to be Turonian. Stratigraphically, the formation is time equivalent with the lower parts of the Chipaque, La Luna and La Frontera Formations. The formation was deposited in a relative highstand sequence with an oceanic oxygen depletion event, sharply marked in Colombia and characterised by the appearance of calcareous concretions with a thick pyrite rim.

=== Yaguarasaurus ===
Fossils of Yaguarasaurus columbianus were described as coming from the "La Frontera Member", part of the "Villeta Formation", in the Quebrada El Ocal, 26 kilometres (16 mi) southwest of Neiva, Huila, and in the Quebrada Itaibe 78 kilometres (48 mi) southwest of Neiva, although in these areas the Hondita Formation is mapped.

== Outcrops ==
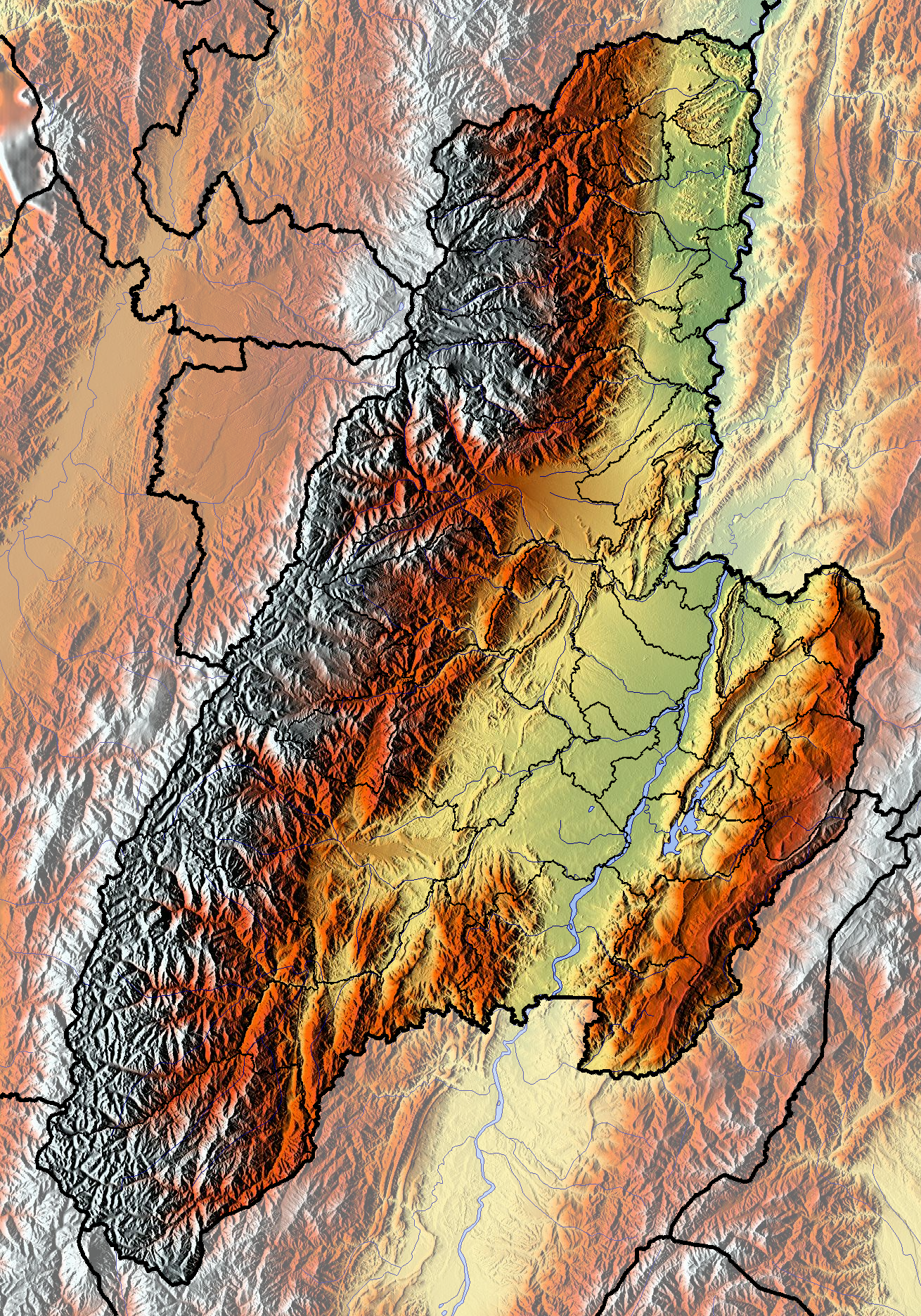
Type locality of the Hondita Formation in Tolima

The type locality of the Hondita Formation is located in Piedras, Tolima. Other outcrops of the Hondita Formation have been noted east of the Magdalena River northeast of Honda, west of Nariño, west across the Magdalena River in San Luis, Tolima, between the Tetuán and Saldaña Rivers west of Coyaima and east and west of Ataco, to the east of the Prado River reservoir, north and west of Aipe, surrounding Alpujarra, Tolima, south of Palermo, Huila, displaced by the Baché Fault, east of Iquira, north of Yaguará, south of La Plata where the formation is cut by the Itaibe Fault, a small patch east of Gigante, Huila, northwest and northeast of San Agustín, and north of Timaná surrounding the Magdalena River.

== See also ==
Geology of the Eastern Hills
Geology of the Ocetá Páramo
Geology of the Altiplano Cundiboyacense
Geology of the Middle Magdalena Valley
