= Oliní Group =

Fossiliferous geological group

- Stratigraphic range: Coniacian-Campanian; ~87–75 Ma
- Type: Geological group
- Sub-units: See text
- Underlies: Córdoba Fm., La Tabla Fm.
- Overlies: Güagüaquí Group; Loma Gorda Formation
- Thickness: up to 287 m (942 ft)

Lithology
- Primary: Radiolarite, siltstone, chert, mudstone
- Other: Sandstone, limestone, conglomerate

Location
- Coordinates: 3°44′12.6″N 75°27′55.5″W
- Region: VMM, VSM and Central, Eastern Ranges, Andes
- Country: Colombia
- Extent: ~700 km (430 mi)

Type section
- Named for: Quebrada Oliní
- Named by: Peters
- Location: Chaparral, Tolima
- Year defined: 1954
- Coordinates: 3°44′12.6″N 75°27′55.5″W
- Approximate paleocoordinates: 1.5°N 54.5°W
- Region: Cundinamarca, Boyacá, Huila, Santander, Tolima
- Country: Colombia
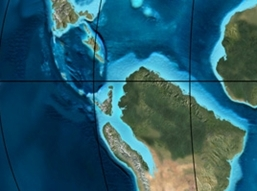
- Paleogeography of Northern South America; 90 Ma, by Ron Blakey

The Oliní Group (Spanish: Grupo Oliní, K_{3}k_{5}o, K2ol, Kso) is a fossiliferous geological group of the VMM, VSM and the eastern flanks of the Central and western flanks of the Eastern Ranges of the Colombian Andes. The regional group stretches from north to south across approximately 700 kilometres (430 mi) and dates to the Late Cretaceous period; Coniacian, Santonian and Campanian epochs, and has a maximum thickness of 287 metres (942 ft). Fossils of Eonatator coellensis have been found in the unit, near Coello, Tolima.

== Etymology ==
The group was named in 1954 by Peters, and redefined by De Porta in 1965. The group was named after Quebrada Oliní in Chaparral, Tolima.

== Subdivisions ==
The Oliní Group is a geological group usually described as a whole due to the problematic lateral continuity, although in other cases the individual formations forming the group are used. Earlier names used were Lower Chert member, Upper Sandstone Member and Upper Chert member. According to Acosta and Ulloa (2002), the group is subdivided into, from bottom to top:

=== Lower Lydite Formation ===
- Native name - Spanish: Formación Lidita Inferior (Ksli)
- Definition - Cáceres and Etayo (1969)
- Age - early Coniacian
- Thickness - 150 metres (490 ft)
- Lithologies - radiolarites (lydites), chert and siliceous siltstones
- Fossil content - Globigerina cretacea, Inoceramus peruanus, Texanites aff. serratomarginatus
- Depositional environment - anoxic pelagic

=== Claystone Level ===
- Native name - Spanish: Nivel de Lutitas (Ksl, Ksom)
- Definition - De Porta (1965)
- Age - Santonian
- Thickness - 100 metres (330 ft)
- Lithologies - siltstones, calcareous and siliceous mica-bearing mudstones intercalated by thick banks of fine sandstones and sporadic shaly limestones
- Fossil content - Bulimina compreza, Dentalina lorneiana, Haplophragmoides excavata, Anomalina redmondi, Dicarinella asymetrica, D. concavata, Rosita fornicata
- Depositional environment - platform

=== Upper Lydite Formation ===
- Native name - Spanish: Formación Lidita Superior (Ksls)
- Definition - De Porta (1965)
- Age - Campanian
- Thickness - 100 to 114 metres (328 to 374 ft)
- Lithologies - calcareous siltstones, chert, radiolarites and micritic limestones with thin beds of conglomerates
- Fossil content - Wheelerella, Sporobulimina, Siphogenerinoides, Globirinelloides praeriehillensis, Rugoglobigerina sp., Globotruncana aff. insignis?, G. ?ventricosa
- Depositional environment - outer platform

== Paleontology ==
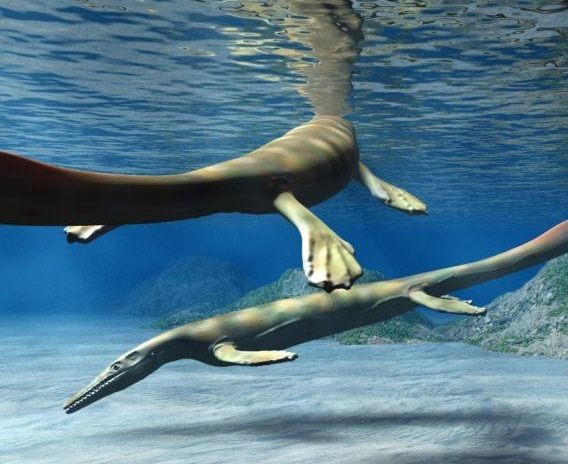
Restoration of Eonatator coellensis

Fossils of the mosasaur Eonatator coellensis were found near Coello, Tolima in the Oliní Group.

== Stratigraphy and depositional environment ==
The Oliní Group conformably overlies the Loma Gorda Formation of the Güagüaquí Group and is overlain by the Cimarrona Formation in the VMM, the Córdoba Formation in the Guaduas Syncline and the La Tabla Formation near Tocaima and in Huila and Tolima. The age has been estimated on the basis of ammonites to be ranging from Coniacian to Campanian. Stratigraphically, the lower part of the formation is time equivalent with the upper part of the Chipaque Formation and the Conejo Formation, while the upper portion correlates with the La Luna Formation and Guadalupe Group. The Oliní Group was deposited in a relative high sea level environment in an outer platform setting, following a sequence boundary, forming the base of the unit. The radiolarites of the Upper Lydite Formation represent a maximum flooding surface.

== Outcrops ==
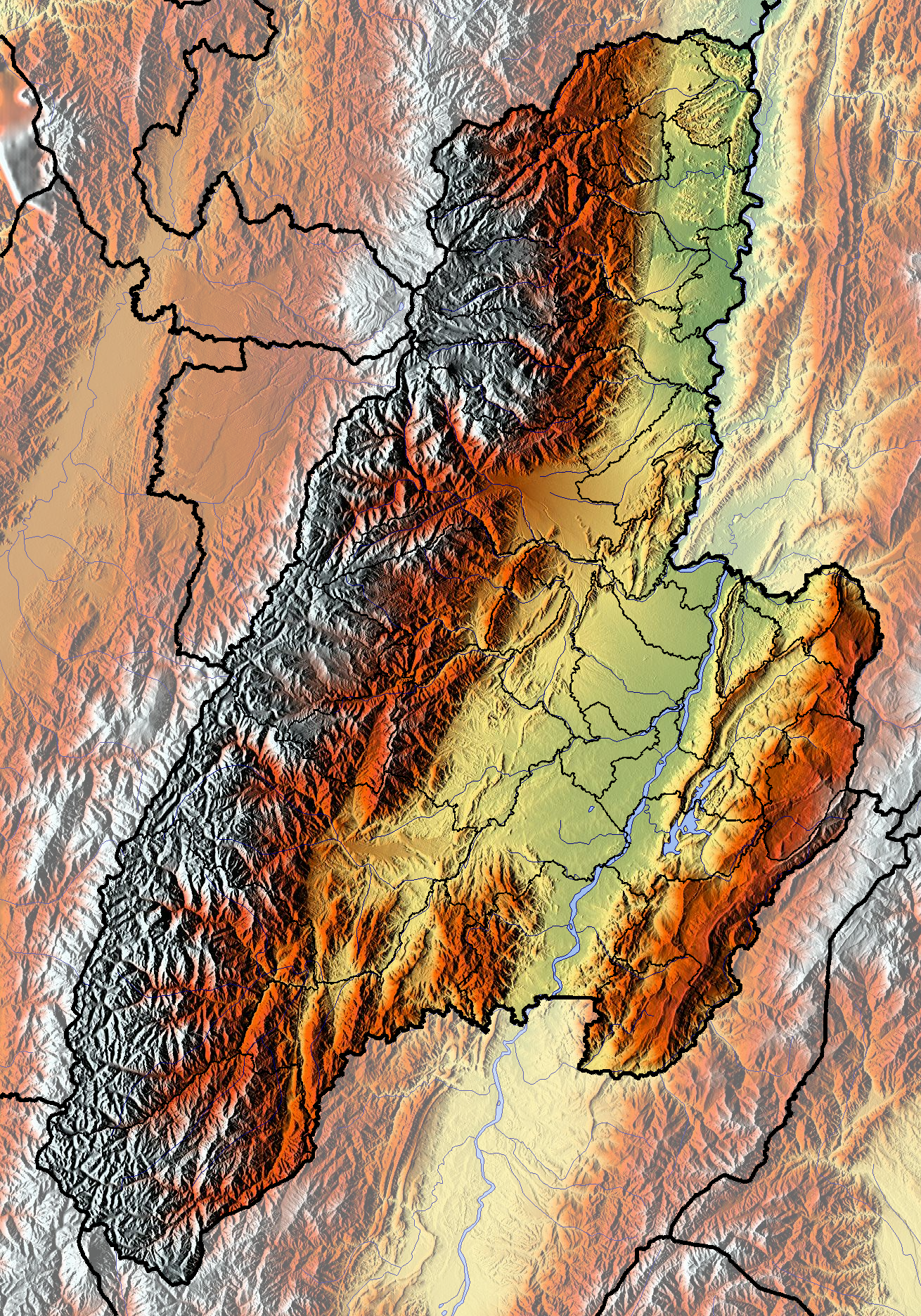
Type locality of the Oliní Group in Tolima
Northern- and southernmost outcrops of the Oliní Group
Type locality

The type locality of the Oliní Group is Quebrada Oliní in Chaparral, Tolima. The group is furthermore found over a large stretch in the eastern Central and western Eastern Ranges of Colombia, bordering the Magdalena River on both sides. The group crops out to the northwest of Vélez in the hanging wall of the El Minero Fault, around Caparrapí, in the footwall of the El Cámbulo Fault between Útica and Guaduas and in the Bituima Synclinal, where it is cross-cut by the Vianí Fault and occurs in the hanging wall of the Alto del Trigo Fault, in the heavily faulted banks of the Magdalena River surrounding Guataquí and northwest of Coello and in the Eastern Ranges cross-cut by the Sumapaz River northeast of Ricaurte, in the hangingwall of the Salcedo Fault to the west of Apulo, on both sides of the Cucuana River near Ortega, in both the hangingwall and footwall of the El Páramo Fault east and south of Carmen de Apicalá and in the hangingwall of the Prado Fault, the hangingwall of the Quinini Fault west and south of Icononzo, the footwall of the La Pava Fault east and southeast of Chaparral, in the footwall and hangingwall of the Altamizal Fault east of Dolores, east and west of the Prado Reservoir near Prado, in the footwall and hangingwall of the Chusma Fault, west of Aipe, east of Alpujarra, in the footwall of the Baché Fault in Palermo, offset by the Picarní and San Andrés Faults, north of Yaguará, east of La Plata, Huila, and the southernmost exposure is found in Naranjal, where the group is emplaced by the Altamira Fault.

== See also ==
Geology of the Eastern Hills
Geology of the Ocetá Páramo
Geology of the Altiplano Cundiboyacense
