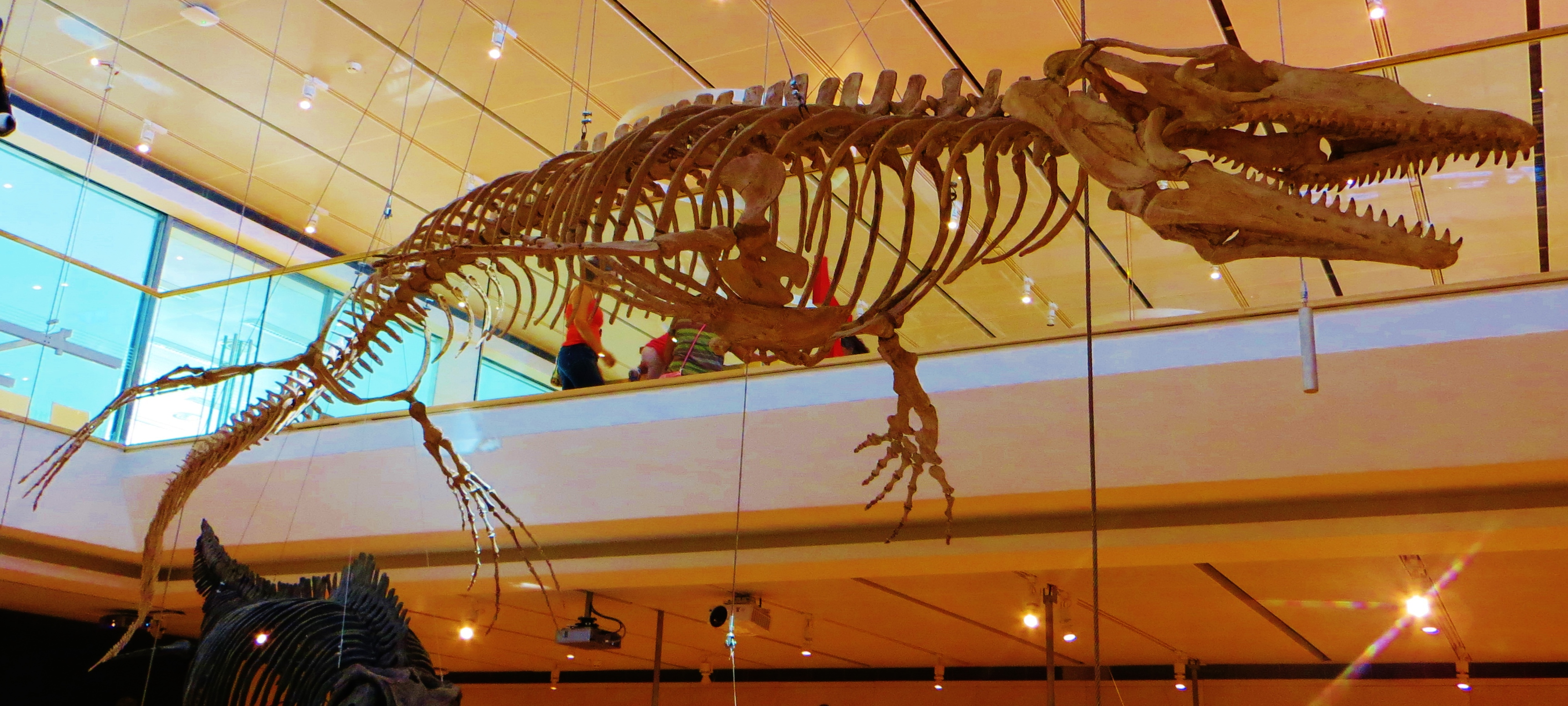
- Skeleton of Halisaurus arambourgi.

Scientific classification
- Kingdom: Animalia
- Phylum: Chordata
- Class: Reptilia
- Order: Squamata
- Clade: †Mosasauria
- Family: †Mosasauridae
- Subfamily: †Halisaurinae; Bardet et al., 2005

Genera
- †Halisaurini; †Eonatator; †Halisaurus; †Phosphorosaurus; †Pluridensini; †Pluridens

= Halisaurinae =

Halisaurinae Temporal range: Late Cretaceous 86.3–66 Ma

Extinct subfamily of lizards

The Halisaurinae are a subfamily of mosasaurs, a group of Late Cretaceous marine lizards. They were small to medium-sized, ranging from just under 3 meters in Eonatator sternbergi to as much as 8 or 9 meters in Pluridens serpentis. They tended to have relatively slender jaws and small, numerous teeth, suggesting a diet of small fish and other prey. Although the skeleton is primitive compared to other Mosasauridae in many respects, halisaurines had the distinctive hypocercal tail of other mosasaurids suggesting good swimming ability, and they persisted alongside other mosasaurs until the end of the Cretaceous. The earliest known remains of halisaurines occur in rocks of Santonian age and the subfamily persists until the latest Maastrichtian. Halisaurines are known from North and South America, Europe, Asia and Africa, indicating a more or less global distribution in the Late Cretaceous. Four genera are currently recognized: Eonatator, Halisaurus, Phosphorosaurus and Pluridens.

== Description ==
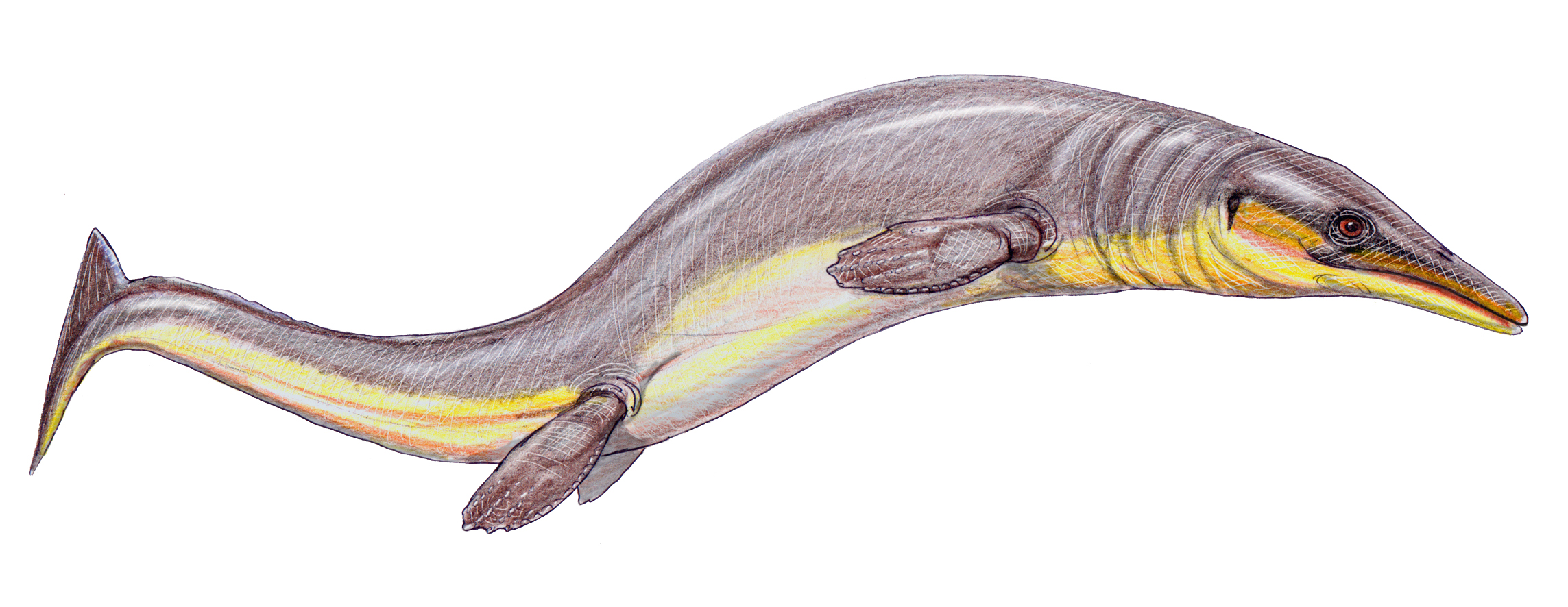
Restoration of Halisaurus.

The Halisaurinae exhibit several characteristics that suggest they are more primitive than mosasaurs of more derived subfamilies. In particular, their flippers are poorly differentiated, meaning that while better adapted to life in oceans than plesiopedal mosasaur genera like Dallasaurus and Tethysaurus, they were poor swimmers compared to many of their contemporaries. Lacking swimming capabilities are quite surprising considering that most other small mosasaurs were adapted to be fast and nimble. The description of Phosphorosaurus ponpetelegans revealed that Phosphorosaurus was highly specialized to compensate for its lack of hydrophalangy.

Despite their shortcomings, the Halisaurinae had diversified and reached a global distribution by the end of the Maastrichtian whilst other subfamilies, particularly the Plioplatecarpinae and Tylosaurinae, appear to have been in decline. There is also evidence supporting that they were accomplished intercontinental migrators, with a known large-scale migration event involving Eonatator during the Campanian from the Western Interior Seaway of North America to what today is southern Sweden.

Bardet et al. (2005, p. 464) diagnosed the Halsaurinae as all mosasaurs more closely related to Halisaurus than Moanasaurus. Unambiguous character states were listed as follows: "premaxilla-maxilla sutural contact vertical anteriorly, oblique at midpoint and horizontal posteriorly; contact plane between the parietal and the supratemporal oblique; preaxial ridge extending on two-thirds of the length of the radius; tibia and fibula long and slender with slightly expanded extremities. Ambiguous characters include "dorsal median ridge borne on the anterior two-thirds of the frontal; frontal with ventral boss; parietal foramen surrounded by a ventral boss; quadrate with large infrastapedial process; coalescent infra- and suprastapedial processes of quadrate; zygosphene-zygantrum complex absent; synapophyses of the cervical vertebrae extending ventrally to the ventral surface of the centrum; fused haemal spines."

== Phylogeny ==
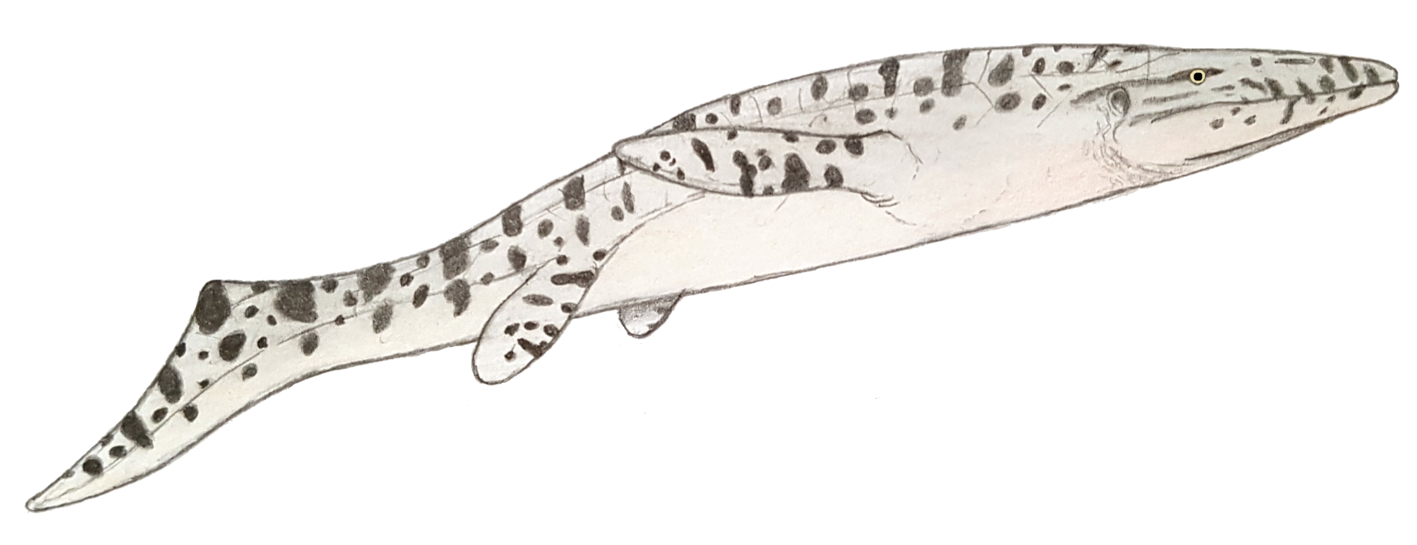
Speculative restoration of Pluridens based on Halisaurus.

Designation of this subfamily followed many decades of confusion surrounding the type genus, Halisaurus, which had long been seen as (and remains) an important taxon in studies of mosasaur phylogeny. The confusion was especially centered on H. sternbergii, a species from the Mooreville Chalk Formation of Alabama and the Niobrara Chalk of Kansas. Originally, the species had been referred to the mosasaurine Clidastes, then to Halisaurus (Russell, 1967; p. 369), which was also considered a member of the Mosasaurinae at that time. Later workers questioned the phylogenetic position and monophyly of Halisaurus, in part because of striking morphological differences between H. sternbergii and the other known species of the taxon.

Several discoveries throughout the 1980s and 1990s helped shed light on Halisaurus, with more complete specimens of the type species H. platyspondylus being discovered and Phosphorosaurus ortliebi being momentarily reassigned to the genus by Lingham-Soliar (1996). In 2005, the species Halisaurus sternbergii was reassigned to its own genus, Eonatator, along with the description of the new species Halisaurus arambourgi by Nathalie Bardet and colleagues. With the description of Eonatator as a closely related genus to Halisaurus, the two genera were grouped into the new subfamily Halisaurinae. Their study supported the model that the group was a sister-group to more advanced mosasaurs. Daniel Madzia and Andrea Cau in 2017 defined Halisaurinae as "the most inclusive clade containing Halisaurus platyspondylus, but not Mosasaurus hoffmannii, Tylosaurus proriger, Tethysaurus nopcsai, or Yaguarasaurus colombianus". Since the description of Eonatator, two more species of Halisaurus, H. ortliebi and H. walkeri were recognised as separate genera; Phosphorosaurus and Pluridens respectively.

The recentmost major phylogenetic analysis of mosasaurs, conducted by Tiago R. Simões and colleagues in May 2017, recovered Halisaurus and the rest of the Halisaurinae as a sister group to the Mosasaurinae instead of the whole Mosasauridae. This would mean that the halisaurines are more closely related to the mosasaurines than the russellosaurines (genera such as Tylosaurus and Plesioplatecarpus) are.

The following cladogram is modified from Longrich et al. (2021) during the description of Pluridens serpentis, with placement of higher taxa based on Madzia & Cau (2017). In that study, Longrich et al. (2021) named the clades Halisaurini and Pluridensini to reflect the two major lineages of halisaurines, defining the former as "the most inclusive clade containing Halisaurus platyspondylus, but not Pluridens walkeri" and the latter as "the most inclusive clade containing Pluridens walkeri, but not Halisaurus platyspondylus".

- - Russellosaurina
  - - Mosasaurinae
    - Halisaurinae
      - Pluridensini
        - "Mooreville Chalk halisaurine" (AUMP 1486)
        - Pluridens serpentis
        - - Pluridens walkeri
          - Pluridens calabaria
      - Halisaurini
        - Eonatator sternbergii
        - - Phosphorosaurus ortliebi
          - - Phosphorosaurus ponpetelegans
            - 'Eonatator' collensis
            - - Halisaurus arambourgi
              - Halisaurus platyspondylus

In their 2023 description of the new Halisaurus species, H. hebae, Shaker et al. analyzed the phylogenetic relationships of members of the Halisaurinae. They suggested that Phosphorosaurus ponpetelegans and Eonatator coellensis were more closely related to the genus Halisaurus than the type species of their respective genera. They tentatively assigned these species to Halisaurus, with "Phosphorosaurus" ponpetelegans possibly representing a distinct genus in need of a new name. The results of their analyses are displayed in the cladogram below:

- Halisaurinae
  - Pluridensini
    - "Mooreville Chalk halisaurine" (AUMP 1486)
    - Pluridens serpentis
    - - Pluridens walkeri
      - Pluridens calabaria
  - Halisaurini
    - Eonatator sternbergii
    - - Phosphorosaurus ortliebi
      - - Halisaurus ("Phosphorosaurus") ponpetelegans
        - - Halisaurus ("Eonatator") coellensis
          - - Halisaurus hebae
            - - Halisaurus arambourgi
              - - Halisaurus platyspondylus

== Species and taxonomy ==
Halisaurinae

- Halisaurus
  - H. platyspondylus
  - H. arambourgi
  - H. onchognathus (nomen dubium; holotype destroyed during World War II)
- Phosphorosaurus
  - P. ortliebi
  - P. ponpetelegans
- Eonatator
  - E. sternbergii
  - E. coellensis
- Pluridens
  - P. walkeri
  - P. calabaria
  - P. serpentis
