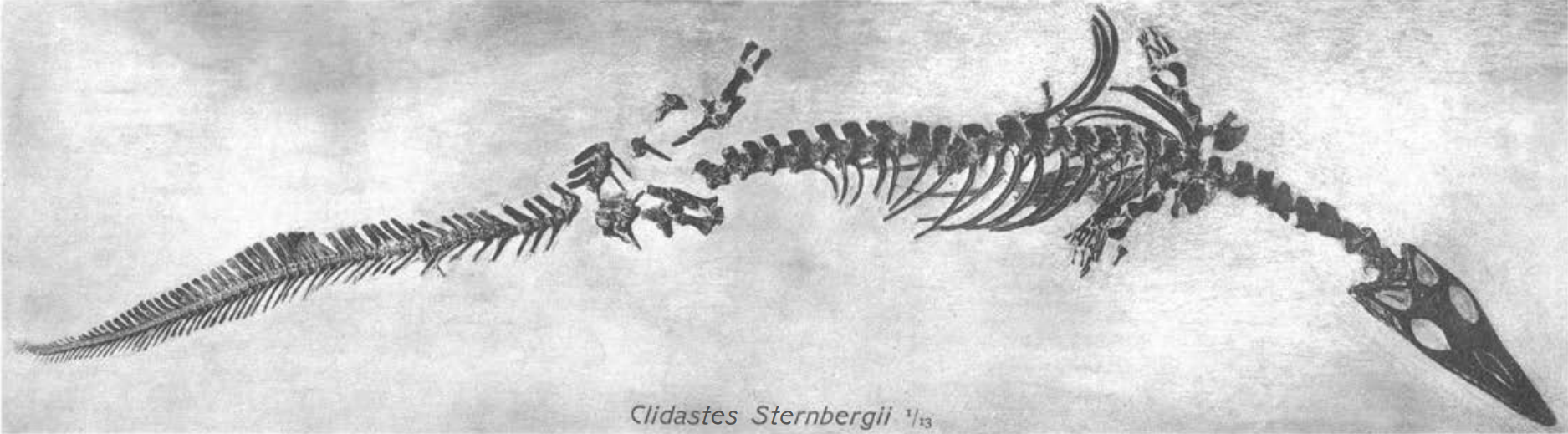
- Holotype of E. sternbergii (UPI R 163) (Note: Note that parts of the skull and tail's neural spines, among others, were restored with plaster to provide an erroneous Clidastes-like appearance.)

Scientific classification
- Kingdom: Animalia
- Phylum: Chordata
- Class: Reptilia
- Order: Squamata
- Clade: †Mosasauria
- Family: †Mosasauridae
- Tribe: †Halisaurini
- Genus: †Eonatator; Bardet et al. 2005

Type species
- Clidastes sternbergii (Wiman 1920)

Species
- Eonatator coellensis Páramo 2013; Eonatator sternbergii (Wiman 1920) (type)

Synonyms
- Clidastes sternbergii (Wiman 1920)

= Eonatator =

Eonatator Temporal range: Santonian-Campanian ~84–72.1 Ma

Extinct genus of lizards

Eonatator is an extinct genus of marine lizard belonging to the mosasaur family. It is a close relative of Halisaurus, and part of the same subfamily, the Halisaurinae. It is known from the Late Cretaceous of North America, Colombia and Sweden. Originally, this taxon was included within Halisaurus, but was placed in its own genus, which also led to the subfamily Halisaurinae being created for the two genera.

== Discovery and naming ==
Eonatator is known from the Smoky Hill Chalk Member of the Niobrara Chalk Formation (Late Coniacian to Early Campanian) of Kansas, from the Eutaw Formation (Santonian) and Mooreville Chalk Formation (Selma Group; Santonian-Lower Campanian) of Alabama (United States), from the Kristianstad Basin of southern Sweden (late early Campanian), and the unit Nivel de Lutitas y Arenas (Campanian) of the Olini Group in La Mesa, Colombia.

The name Eonatator means "dawn swimmer" (Greek eos = dawn + Latin natator = swimmer). Originally, it contained only a single species, E. sternbergii. The species is named in honour of Charles Hazelius Sternberg and his son, Levi, who discovered the type specimen in the Niobrara Chalk during the summer of 1918. A second species, E. coellensis, was named for the town of Coello in the Department of Tolima in Colombia, near of which it was discovered.

== Description ==
Size comparison of the two known species of Eonatator, E. sternbergii and E. coellensis

Eonatator was a small mosasaur, with the type specimen of Eonatator sternbergii, UPI R 163, measuring approximately 2.6 metres (8.5 ft) long. Bardet et al. (2005, p. 465) diagnose Eonatator sternbergii as follows: "Ambiguous characters: premaxilla-maxilla lateral suture ending posterior to 9th maxillary teeth; tail about 40% of the head and trunk length (convergent in mosasaurines); caudal vertebra length greater than width; fewer than four pygal vertebrae; femur length about twice distal width (convergent in Clidastes). Autapomorphies: parietal with smooth triangular table extending very far posteriorly, bearing medium-sized circular foramen, located at distance twice its diameter from the frontal-parietal suture, and surrounded anteriorly and posteriorly by two parallel ridges; rounded quadrate with regularly convex tympanic ala (wing); vertebral formula: seven cervicals, 24 dorsals, four pygals, 28 median caudals and at least 41 terminal caudals; humerus length approximately 2.5x distal width." E. coellensis is diagnosed by more retracted nostrils, between the 7 and the 17 maxillary teeth, premaxilla and maxilla with a short rostrum anterior to the first teeth; presence of a septomaxilla, a large prefrontal that makes most of the margin of the outer nostril, a short and wide frontal, a parietal foramen located near of the fronto-parietal suture, a triangular surface of the parietal with two medial depressions and 22 caudal vertebrae.

The type specimen of E. coellensis, IGM p 881237, measures 2.8 metres (9.2 ft) long as preserved, but is missing part of its tail. This specimen had a 41.5 cm (16.3 in) long skull and lacked a complete tail. Still, it is remarkable for having remains of soft tissue in the ear region, the neck, thoracic and the abdominal region. Under the pygal vertebrae and the seventeenth dorsal vertebra there is a series of 20 small vertebrae centra and a flattened bone, that together measure 25 cm (9.8 in) in length. It have features of the mosasauroids, with three vertebrae with haemal arches and procoelic centra, that suggest the possibility that these small bones belong to an embryo of this species, although the lack of diagnostic fossils like the skull or teeth prevents a complete identification. In any case, it will be consequent with the ovoviviparism previously reported in mosasauroids like Carsosaurus.

== Classification ==
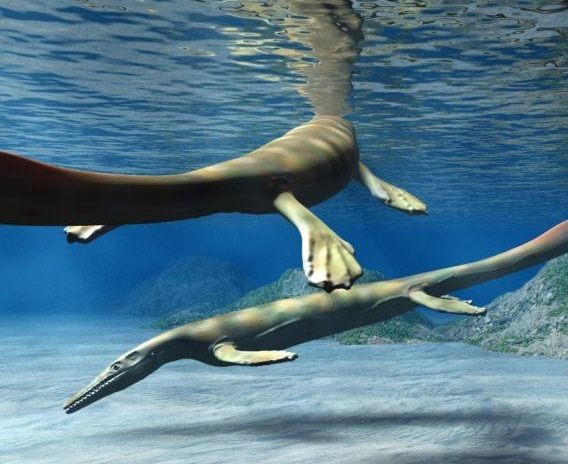
Restoration of E. sternbergii

Like many mosasaurs, this genus has a complicated taxonomic history. The type specimen (UPI R 163, Uppsala University Palaeontological Institute, Uppsala, Sweden), a nearly complete skeleton, was originally referred to the genus Clidastes by Wiman and then to Halisaurus by Russell. Hence, Clidastes sternbergii became Halisaurus sternbergii. Although some agreed with this generic attribution, other paleontologists suggested that while H. sternbergii did not belong to Clidastes, its designation under Halisaurus is questionable; Lingham-Soliar (1996) referred H. sternbergii to C. sternbergii again, but this has found no acceptance in other researchers.

In 2005, Halisaurus sternbergii was reassigned to its own genus, Eonatator by Nathalie Bardet and colleagues along with the description of Halisaurus arambourgi and the creation of the subfamily Halisaurinae. In the same year, Lindgren and Siverson suggested that Eonatator is an invalid junior synonym and should be classified as H. sternbergii, but this has found no acceptance in other researchers who used the genus name Eonatator instead.

Below is a cladogram following an analysis by Takuya Konishi and colleagues (2016) done during the description of Phosphorosaurus ponpetelegans, which showcases the internal relationships within the Halisaurinae. The analysis excluded the dubious Halisaurus onchognathus and the genus Pluridens.

- Halisaurinae
  - Halisaurus arambourgi
  - - Halisaurus platyspondylus
    - Eonatator coellensis
    - - Eonatator sternbergii
      - - Phosphorosaurus ortliebi
        - Phosphorosaurus ponpetelegans

In their 2023 description of the new Halisaurus species, H. hebae, Shaker et al. performed a phylogenetic analyses of members of the Halisaurinae. They suggested that Phosphorosaurus ponpetelegans and Eonatator coellensis were more closely related to the genus Halisaurus than the type species of their respective genera. They tentatively assigned both of these species to Halisaurus. The results of their analyses are displayed in the cladogram below:

- Halisaurini
  - Eonatator sternbergii
  - - Phosphorosaurus ortliebi
    - - Halisaurus ("Phosphorosaurus") ponpetelegans
      - - Halisaurus ("Eonatator") coellensis
        - - Halisaurus hebae
          - - Halisaurus arambourgi
            - - Halisaurus platyspondylus
