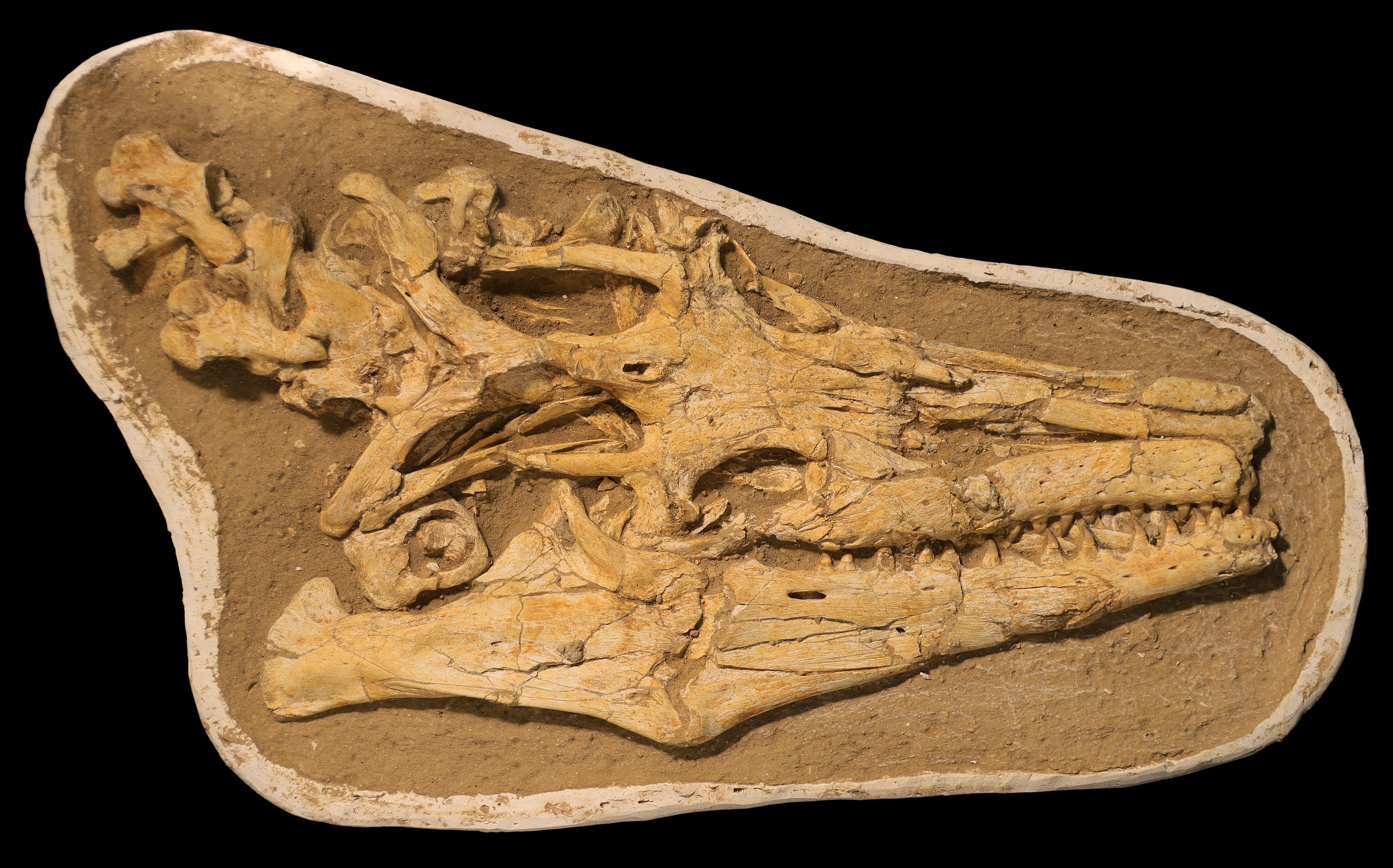
- Skull of Pluridens serpentis

Scientific classification
- Kingdom: Animalia
- Phylum: Chordata
- Class: Reptilia
- Order: Squamata
- Clade: †Mosasauria
- Family: †Mosasauridae
- Tribe: †Pluridensini
- Genus: †Pluridens; Lingham-Soliar, 1998

Type species
- †Pluridens walkeri Lingham-Soliar, 1998

Other species
- †P. calabaria Longrich, 2016; †P. serpentis Longrich et al., 2021; †P. imelaki Longrich & Jalil, 2026

= Pluridens =

Pluridens Temporal range: Late Cretaceous 70.6–66 Ma

Extinct genus of lizards

Pluridens ("many teeth") is an extinct genus of marine lizard belonging to the Mosasauridae. Pluridens is placed in the subfamily Halisaurinae with the genera Phosphorosaurus, Eonatator and Halisaurus. Compared to related halisaurines, Pluridens had longer jaws with more teeth, and smaller eyes. It also grew large size, measuring 5–6 m (16–20 ft) long and perhaps over 9 m (30 ft) in some individuals. The jaws in some specimens are robust, and sometimes show injuries suggestive of combat. The jaws may have been used for fighting over mates or territories.

Pluridens lived in the shallow seas of West Africa during the late Campanian-Maastrichtian. The genus contains four named species, P. walkeri, P. calabaria, P. serpentis and P. imelaki. The type species P. walkeri is known from the Maastrichtian of southwest Niger, whereas P. calabaria is found in slightly older (late Campanian) deposits in Nigeria. P. serpentis and P. imelaki were found in Maastrichtian deposits in Morocco. Pluridens was briefly synonymized with Halisaurus by Lindgren and Siverson (2005), but subsequent studies rejected the synonymy.

== Description ==
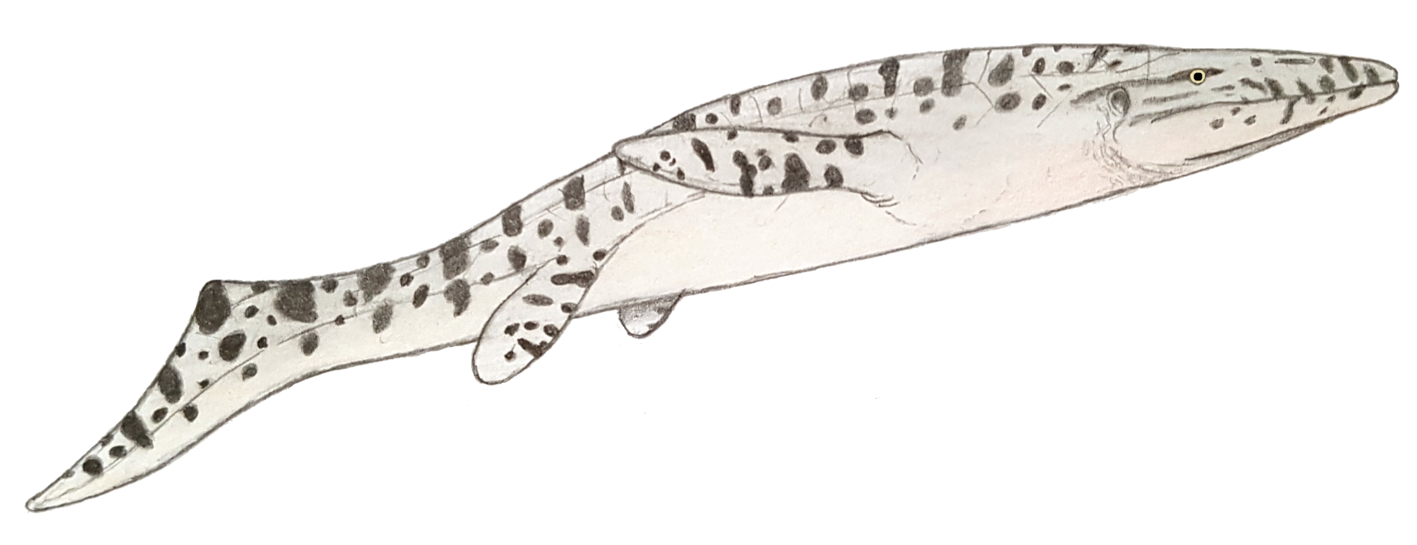
Speculative restoration of P. walkeri, based on the related mosasaur Halisaurus

Pluridens was a moderately large mosasaur at roughly 5–6 m (16–20 ft) in length if the proportions of the dentary and the rest of the animal matches that of Halisaurus; the referred material suggests an even larger body size at more than 9 m (30 ft) in length. A feature that separates Pluridens not only from the rest of the Halisaurinae, but from the rest of the Mosasauridae at large is its unusually high tooth count, dentaries assigned to the genus preserve almost twice the amount of teeth found in most other mosasaur genera. Additionally, the dentary of Pluridens also has one of the slenderest profiles among the mosasaurs; the only genus having a similarly narrow dentary being the mosasaurine Plotosaurus. This combination of features indicate a feeding niche and lifestyle unique among the mosasaurs.

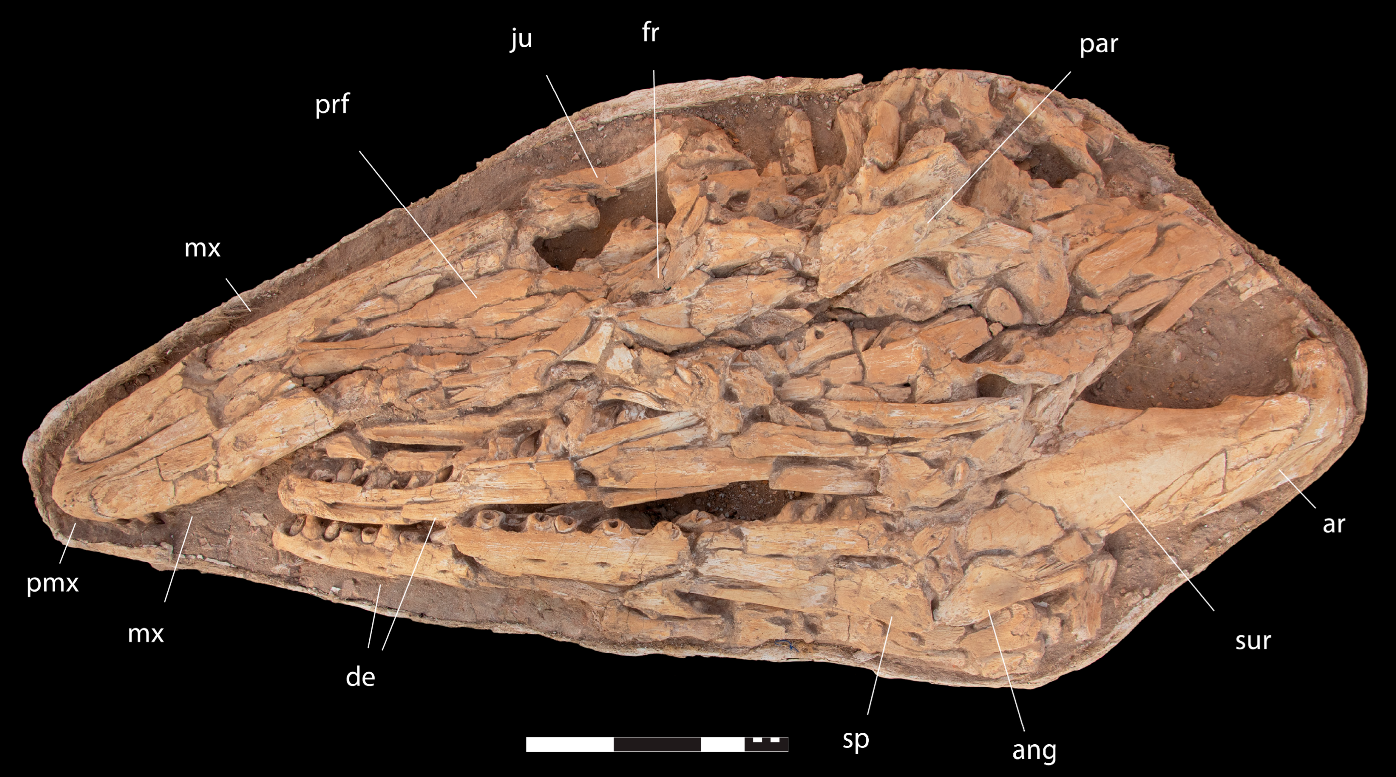
Holotype skull of P. imelaki

The shallow dentary and small teeth of Pluridens was likely elongated relative to the rest of the head to allow for the massive battery of teeth. Due to force exerted by the lower jaw when biting against the upper jaw would decrease with the distance from the joint, the anterior teeth would have been ineffectual for biting and crushing. Lingham-Soliar (1998) likened the lifestyle and feeding of Pluridens with that of the ichthyosaurs, particularly early ichthyosaurs such as Temnodontosaurus and Leptonectes.

Lingham-Soliar (1998) listed the following unambiguous character states for the genus: "Very long, slender dentary, anterior half cross-section almost circular extending to tip. Twenty eight-plus teeth in dentary, close-set. Tooth crowns short, no distinguishable carinae, broad, smooth anterior surface, hairline crenations posterior, slightly discernible broad facets, tips posteriorly recurved; teeth virtually uniform in size along most of the dental ramus; replacement teeth emerge medial to mature tooth crowns; resorption pits on mid-lingual side of tooth base".

== Classification ==
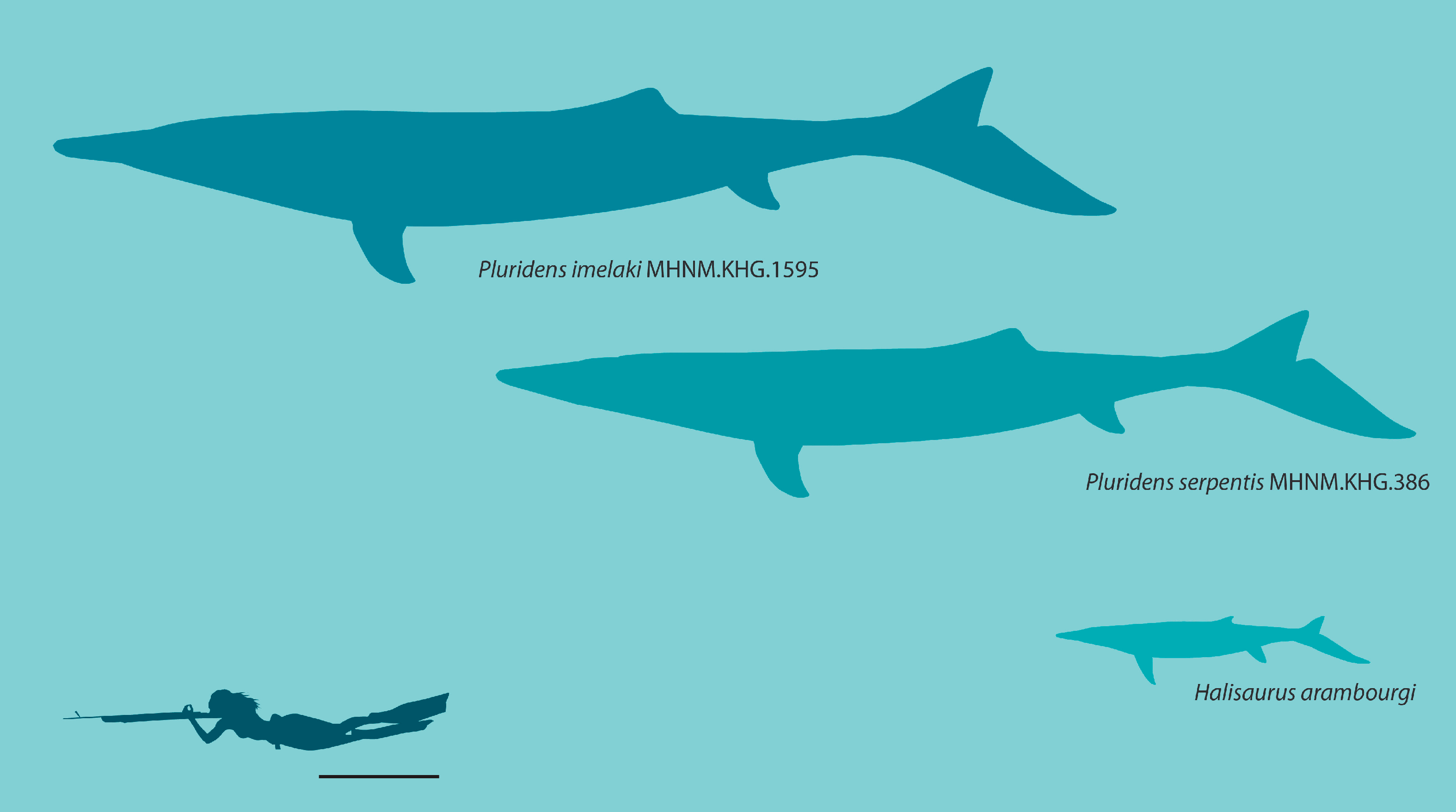
Size of P. imelaki, P. serpentis, and Halisaurus compared to a human

The unusually high amount of teeth present in the dentaries of both species of Pluridens initially made it difficult to immediately assign a classification on the subfamily level. Lingham-Soliar (1998) remarked that the unique combination of features (e.g. the high tooth count and a unique tooth shape) would normally result in the creation of a completely new subfamily, but did not create a new subfamily due to the rather fragmentary nature of the remains. Lindgren and Siverson (2005) considered many of the unique features of Pluridens to be shared with Halisaurus and reassigned P. walkeri as "Halisaurus walkeri". The genus synonymy was rejected by later authors, though similarities between the genera and the discovery of distinctly halisaurine vertebrae in Niger allowed the genus to be firmly placed within the Halisaurinae. Thus, Pluridens is today considered a highly derived halisaurine. The results of the phylogenetic analysis of Longrich et al. (2026) are displayed in the cladogram below:

- Halisaurinae
  - Pluridensini
    - Mooreville Chalk halisaurine
    - Pluridens
      - Pluridens calabaria
      - - Pluridens imelaki
        - Pluridens serpentis
        - Pluridens walkeri
  - Halisaurini
    - Eonatator sternbergii
    - - Phosphorosaurus ortliebi
      - Halisaurus
        - Halisaurus coellensis
        - - Halisaurus hebae
          - Halisaurus ponpetelegans
          - - Halisaurus arambourgi
            - Halisaurus platyspondylus

=== Species and specimens ===
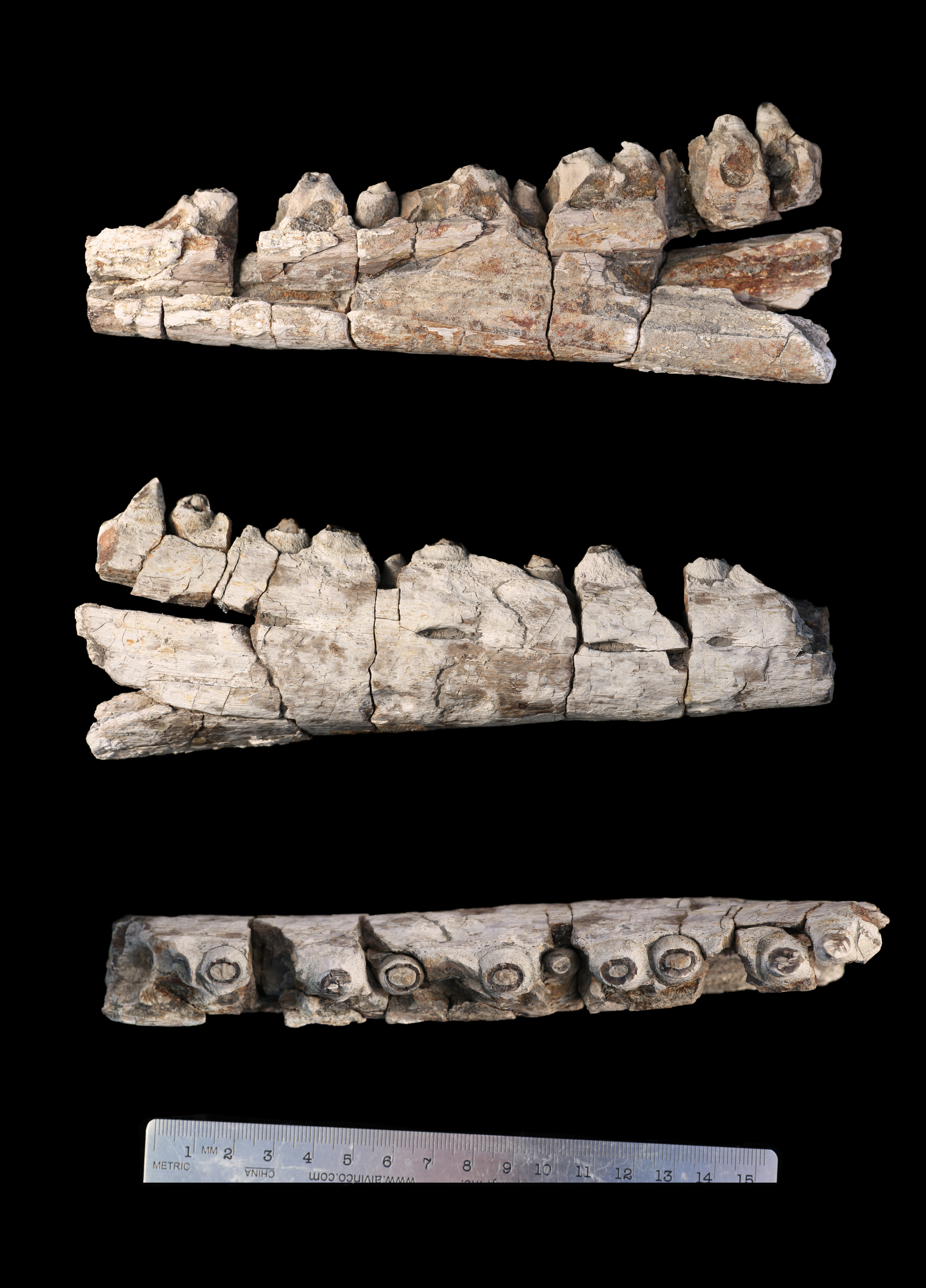
Partial right mandible of P. calabaria from the upper Campanian Nkporo Shale of Nigeria, West Africa

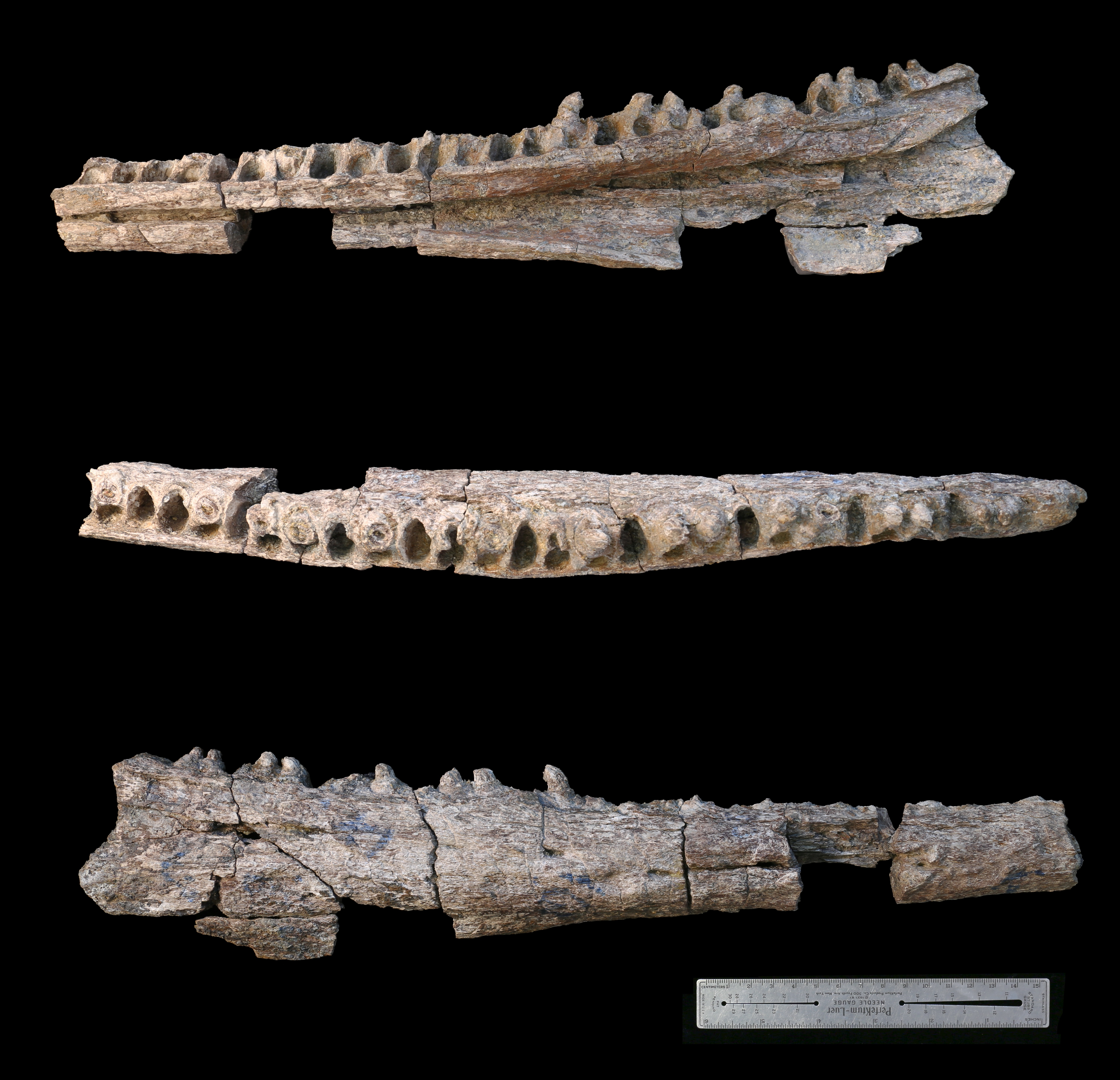
Dentary of P. walkeri

Three species are known, Pluridens walkeri from the early Maastrichtian of Niger, P. calabaria from the Campanian of Nigeria, and P. serpentis from the late Maastrichtian of Morocco.

The type specimen of P. walkeri is BMNH R14153, an almost complete dentary recovered from the Maastrichtian Farin-Doutchi Formation near Mount Ilatarda, Niger.

Lingham-Soliar (1998) also assigned BMNH R9804, a partial dentary with poorly preserved teeth (one out of which is almost complete) from the late Campanian of the Nkporo Formation near Calabar in southern Nigeria, to P. walkeri. The Nigerian specimen BMNH R9804 was reassigned to its own species by Longrich (2016) as it lacks many of the derived features that characterize P. walkeri, such as a high tooth count and extreme elongation of the dentary. The Calabar dentary also lack the extreme lateral protrusion and subcircular section of the dentary and the strong transverse expansion of the dental thecae, both of which are present in BMNH R14153. Longrich (2016) dubbed the new species Pluridens calabaria. It may be a direct ancestor to P. walkeri.

A third species, Pluridens serpentis, was described from the late Maastrichtian Ouled Abdoun Basin of Morocco in 2021. It is the most completely known species, being represented by two skulls and a number of jaws. A fourth species, Pluridens imelaki, was also described from the same phosphates of Morocco in 2026 based on a single skull and associated lower jaws.
