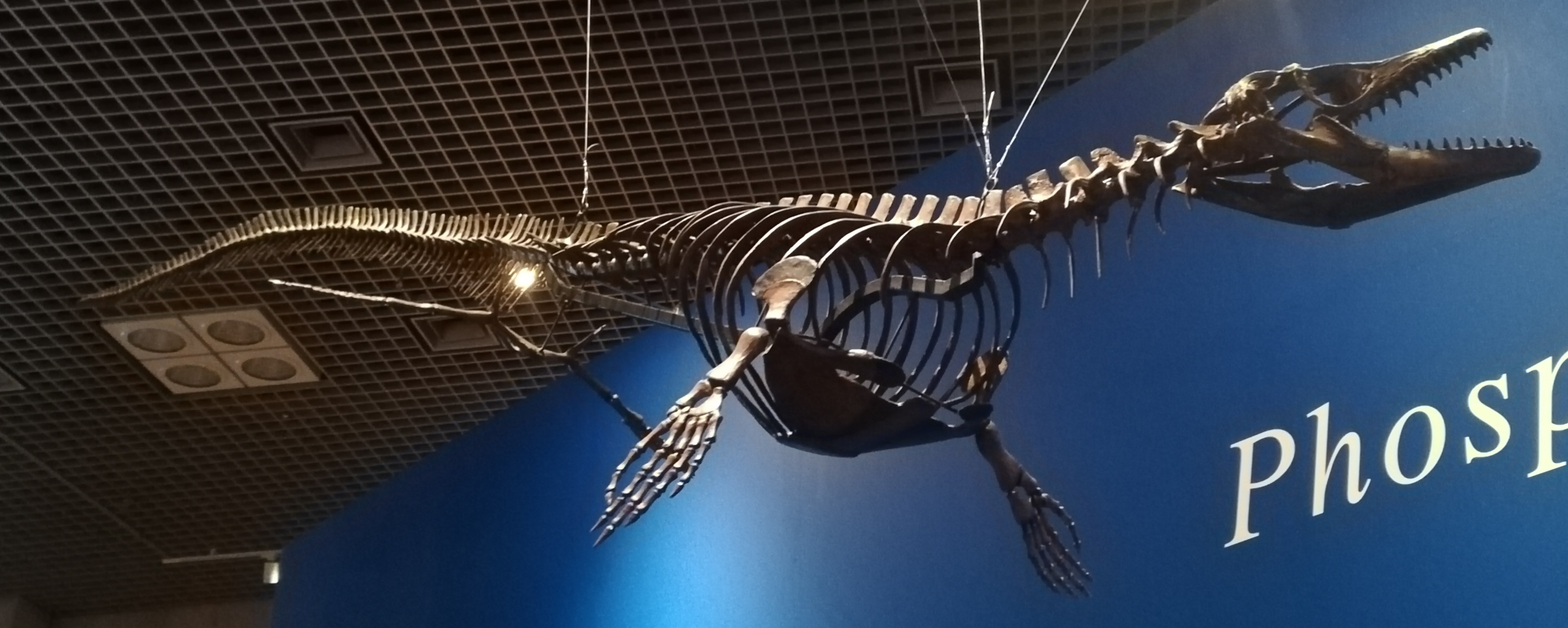
- Skeleton of P. ponpetelegans exhibited at a limited exhibition event in the National Museum of Nature and Science, Tokyo

Scientific classification
- Domain: Eukaryota
- Kingdom: Animalia
- Phylum: Chordata
- Class: Reptilia
- Order: Squamata
- Clade: †Mosasauria
- Family: †Mosasauridae
- Tribe: †Halisaurini
- Genus: †Phosphorosaurus; Dollo, 1889

Species
- P. ortliebi Dollo, 1889 (type); P. ponpetelegans Konishi et al. 2015

= Phosphorosaurus =

Phosphorosaurus Temporal range: Late Cretaceous, Maastrichtian 72.1–66 Ma

Extinct genus of lizards

Phosphorosaurus ("phosphate lizard") is an extinct genus of marine lizard belonging to the mosasaur family. Phosphorosaurus is classified within the Halisaurinae subfamily alongside the genera Pluridens, Eonatator, and Halisaurus.

Stratigraphically, Phosphorosaurus is only known from the Maastrichtian age of the Late Cretaceous. Although treated as synonymous with Halisaurus in the past, recent studies recognize it as a valid genus. Two species are known: Phosphorosaurus ortliebi, from the Craie de Ciply Formation in Belgium, and P. ponpetelegans, from the Hakobuchi Formation of Hokkaido in Japan. P. ponpetelegans is only known from the very earliest Maastrichtian, whilst P. ortliebi lived throughout the Maastrichtian.

== Description ==
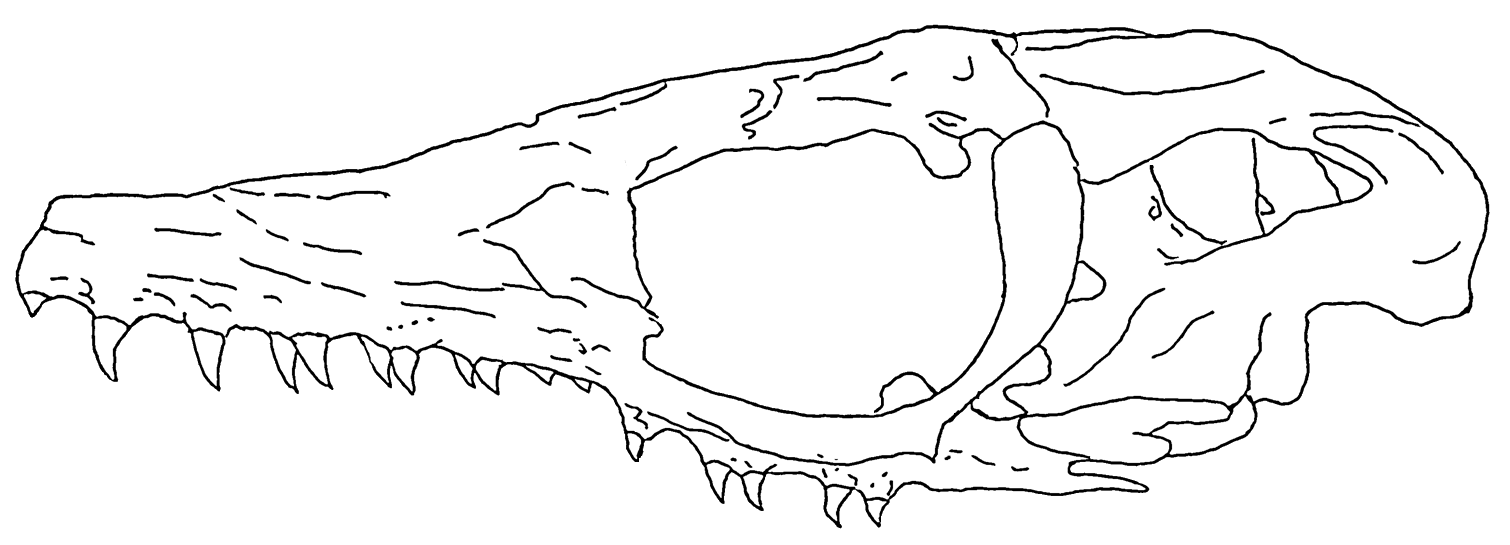
Illustration of HMG-1528, the holotype skull of P. ponpetelegans

Phosphorosaurus was small compared to most other mosasaurs, but rather standard in size for a halisaurine. Analysis of Phosphorosaurus biology suggests that this mosasaur was a deep-water or nocturnal hunter, potentially preying on animals such as squid and bioluminescent fish similar to the modern lanternfish present in the same areas. The large eyes of Phosphorosaurus had overlapping fields of vision, giving it depth perception, which would have given it an advantage when chasing such animals in poorly-lit conditions. Studies also indicate that the animal was likely an ambush predator that would lie in wait for prey, as it was not as efficient a swimmer as larger mosasaurs, much like other halisaurines.

Konishi et al. 2015 listed the following unambiguous character states for the genus: "Dorsal exposure of prefrontal confined to preorbital segment of frontal; preorbital segment of frontal narrow, sloping anteroventrally; frontal preorbital borders subparallel with each other; interorbital emargination present; frontal lateral border forming a step-like junction between preorbital and interorbital segments; apex of posterodorsal triangular plateau on frontal reaching level of interorbital constriction; frontal articulation facet for postorbitofrontal squareshaped in outline; parietal postorbital process dorsally not separated by ridge from parietal table; and stapedial meatus parallel-sided".

== Classification ==
Belgian palaeontologist Louis Dollo defined the genus in 1889, with the description of Phosphorosaurus ortliebi from the upper Maastrichtian Craie phosphateé of Ciply in Belgium. The holotype is a fragmented and incomplete skull that is estimated to have been around 42 cm long. It was reclassified as Halisaurus ortliebi in 1996, but this was not taken up by later authorities due to differences in the cranium.

Below is a cladogram following an analysis by Takuya Konishi and colleagues (2015) done during the description of P. ponpetelegans, which showcases the internal relationships within the Halisaurinae. The analysis excluded the dubious Halisaurus onchognathus and the genus Pluridens.

- Halisaurinae
  - Halisaurus arambourgi
  - - Halisaurus platyspondylus
    - Eonatator coellensis
    - - Eonatator sternbergii
      - - Phosphorosaurus ortliebi
        - Phosphorosaurus ponpetelegans

In their 2023 description of the new Halisaurus species, H. hebae, Shaker et al. performed a phylogenetic analyses of members of the Halisaurinae. They suggested that Phosphorosaurus ponpetelegans and Eonatator coellensis were more closely related to the genus Halisaurus than the type species of their respective genera. They tentatively assigned these species to Halisaurus, with "Phosphorosaurus" ponpetelegans possibly representing a distinct genus in need of a new name. The results of their analyses are displayed in the cladogram below:

- Halisaurini
  - Eonatator sternbergii
  - - Phosphorosaurus ortliebi
    - - Halisaurus ("Phosphorosaurus") ponpetelegans
      - - Halisaurus ("Eonatator") coellensis
        - - Halisaurus hebae
          - - Halisaurus arambourgi
            - - Halisaurus platyspondylus

=== Species ===
Two species are known, P. ortliebi and P. ponpetelegans, the latter from the oldest Maastrichtian beds located in Hokkaido, Japan. The skull of the latter species is thought to be around 50 cm long. The etymology of P. ponpetelegans derives from the words "ponpet", which means "creek" in Ainu (language of the indigenous peoples of Hokkaido), and "elegans", Latin for "elegant", referencing the exceptional preservation of the holotype specimen of the species and the clean Pankerusano-sawa Creek where the fossil was discovered.

P. ortliebi and P. ponpetelgans can be distinguished from each other by several fossil characters. For instance, the prefrontal postnarial medial lamina are smaller in P. ponpetelgans than in P. ortliebi and the development of prefrontal supraorbital tuberosity is minimal compared to P. ortliebi. In P. ponpetelgans the median dorsal ridge of the frontal becomes weak posterior to the orbits, which does not occur in P. ortliebi.
