= Zygosphene-zygantrum articulation =

The zygosphene-zygantrum articulation is an accessory joint between vertebrae found in several lepidosauromorph reptiles. This pivot joint consists of a forward-facing, wedge-shaped process called the zygosphene, that fits in a depression on the rearside of the next vertebrae, called the zygantrum. The zygosphene sits between the prezygapophysis in the neural arch, whereas the zygantrum sits between the postzygapophysis.

This joint is found in snakes, lacertids, teiids, Gymnophthalmids as well as in some iguanids and cordylids. It is also found in several fossil groups such as plesiosaurians, nothosaurians and pachypleurosaurians. It is absent in today's Monitor lizard (Varanus), but occurs in fossil Varanids.

The zygosphene-zygantrum joint's function is to stabilize the vertebral column. While it permits horizontal and vertical movements of the vertebral column, it prevents rotations of the single vertebrae against each other.

== See also ==
- Hyposphene-hypantrum articulation, in the Archosauromorpha
