= Yaguará =

- Municipality and town
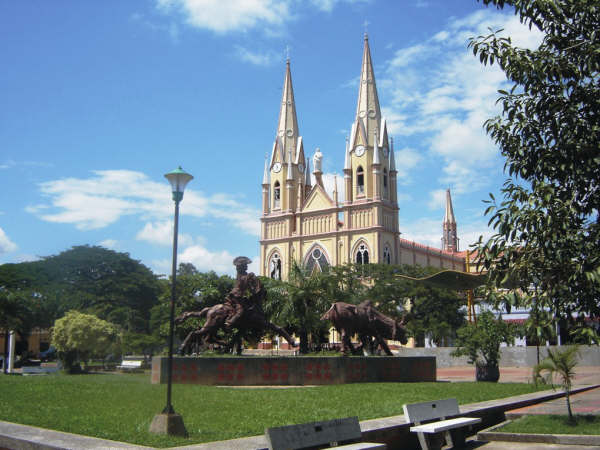
- Central square and church

- Flag Coat of arms

- Location of the municipality and town of Yaguará in the Huila Department of Colombia
- Coordinates: 2.66611°N 75.5186°W
- Country: Colombia
- Department: Huila
- Subregion: Subnorte
- Founded: 13 March 1623
- Founder: Francisco Gómez Quintero

Government
  - Mayor: Rafael Ramírez González (2016-2019)

Area
  - Municipality and town: 329 km^{2} (127 sq mi)
- Elevation: 650 m (2,130 ft)

Population (2015)
  - Municipality and town: 8,952
  - Density: 27.2/km^{2} (70.5/sq mi)
  - Urban: 7,587
- Time zone: UTC-5 (Colombia Standard Time)
- Website: Official website

Yaguará (Spanish pronunciation: [ɟʝaɣwaˈɾa]) is a town and municipality in the Huila Department, Colombia. The urban centre is located at an elevation of 650 metres (2,130 ft) in the Magdalena River Valley and the Eastern Ranges of the Colombian Andes. The municipality borders Teruel and Palermo in the north, Gigante, Hobo and Tesalia in the south, Campoalegre and Hobo in the east and Tesalia and Iquira in the west. The departmental capital Neiva is 49 kilometres (30 mi) to the northeast. The Betania Reservoir is situated within the boundaries of Yaguará.

== Etymology ==
The name Yaguará is derived from the jaguar.

== History ==
In the time before the Spanish conquest, the region of Yaguará was inhabited by the Páez. They defended their territory against the Pijao, who came from nearby Tolima and later against the Spanish conquistadors.

Modern Yaguará was founded on March 13, 1623 by Francisco Gómez Quintero, under the command of the governor of Neiva, Diego de Ospina y Medinilla.

== Paleontology ==
Fossils of the Late Cretaceous (Turonian) mosasaur Yaguarasaurus were found in the La Frontera Formation in Yaguará and the species was named after the town.

== Gallery ==
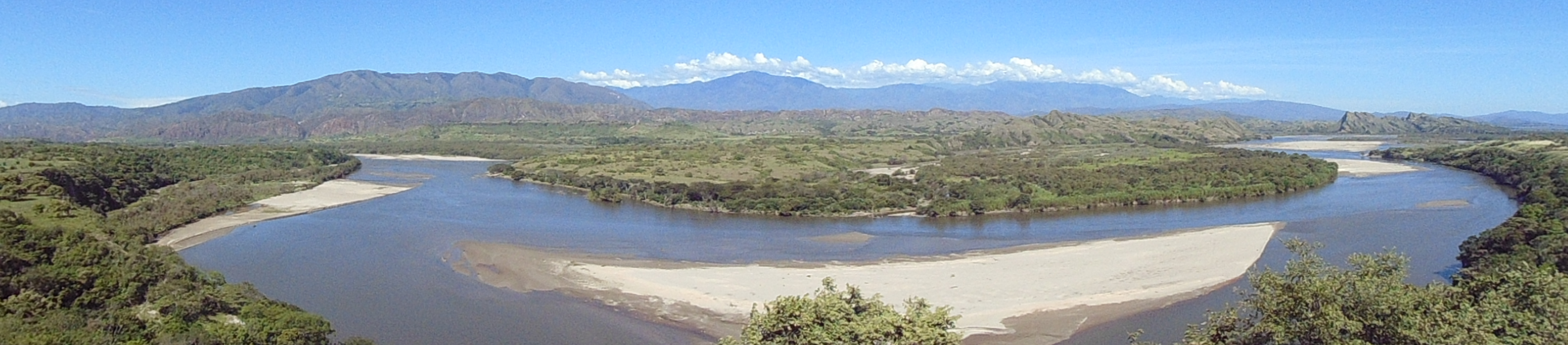
Panorama of the Betania Reservoir
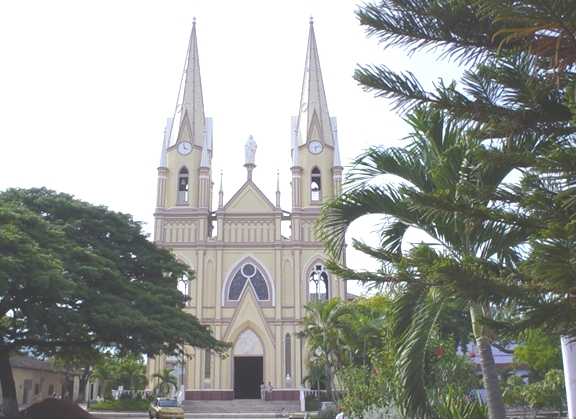
Church of Yaguará

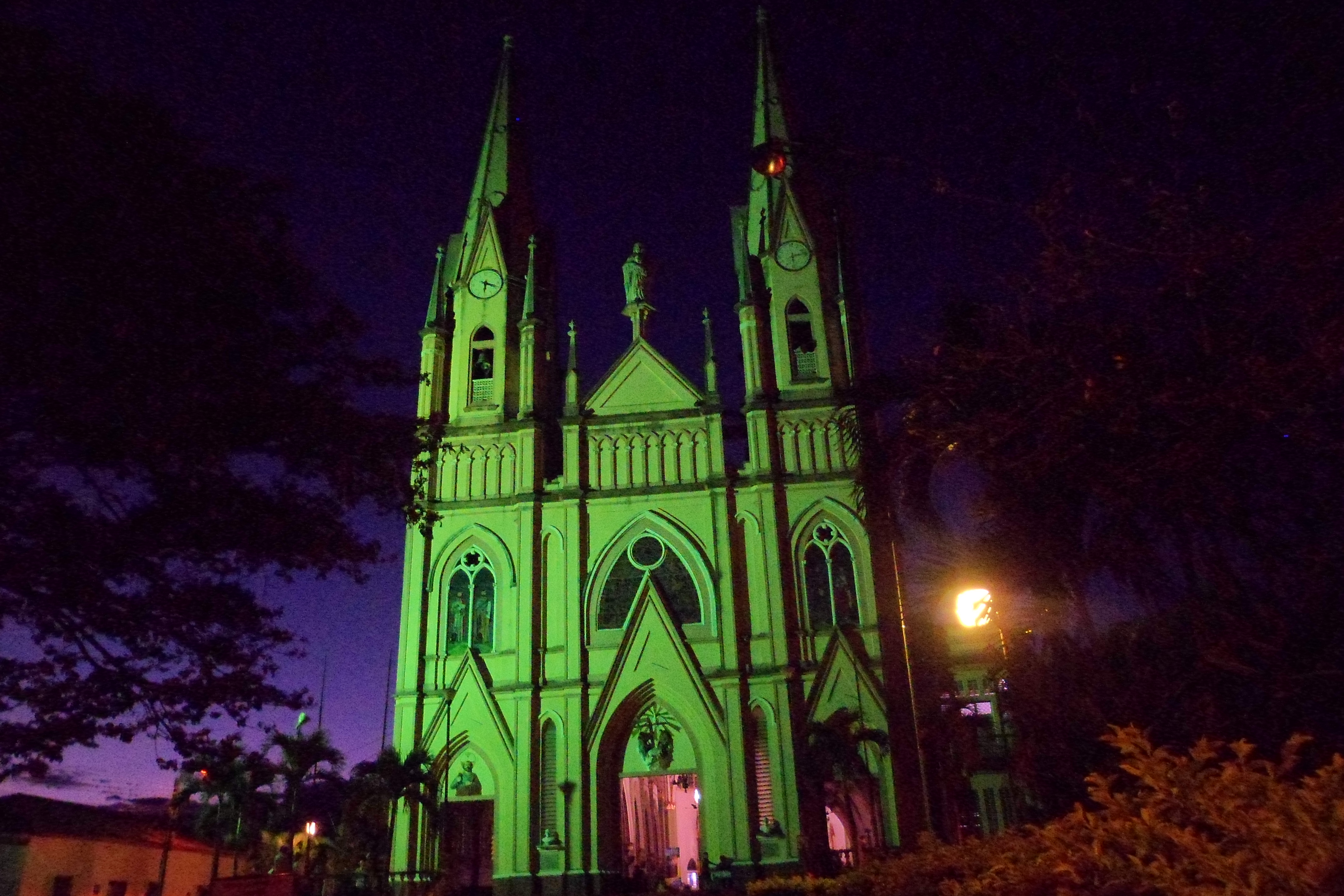
Church by night

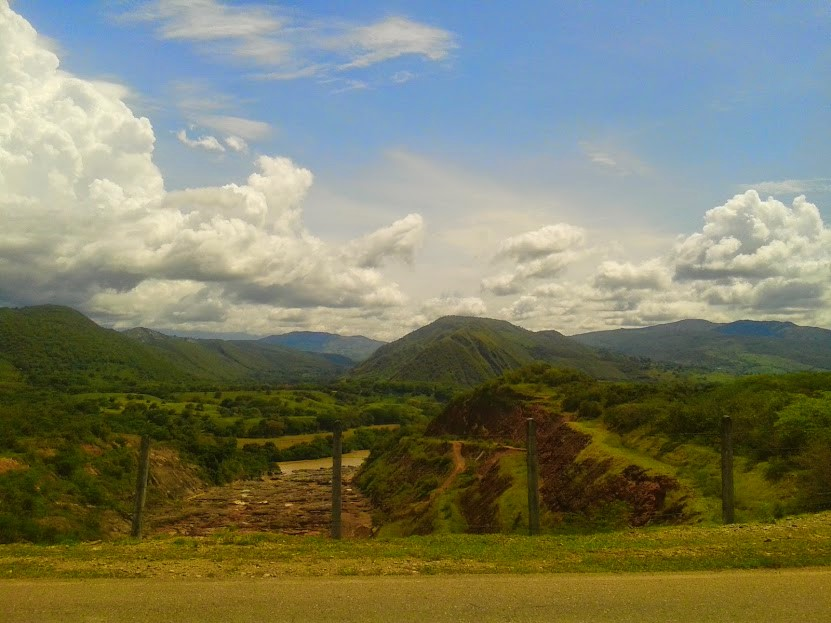
Rural Yaguará

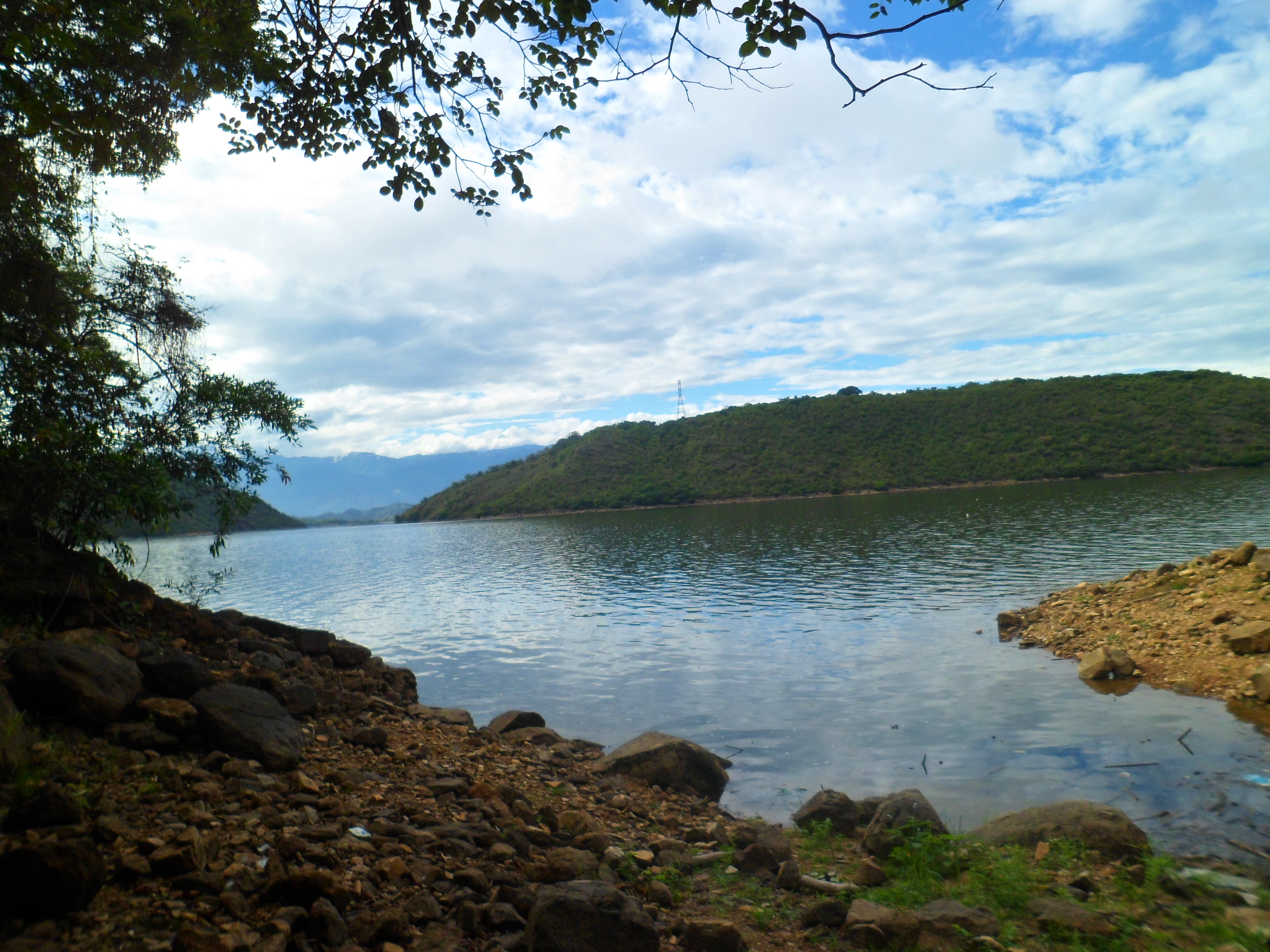
Betania Reservoir

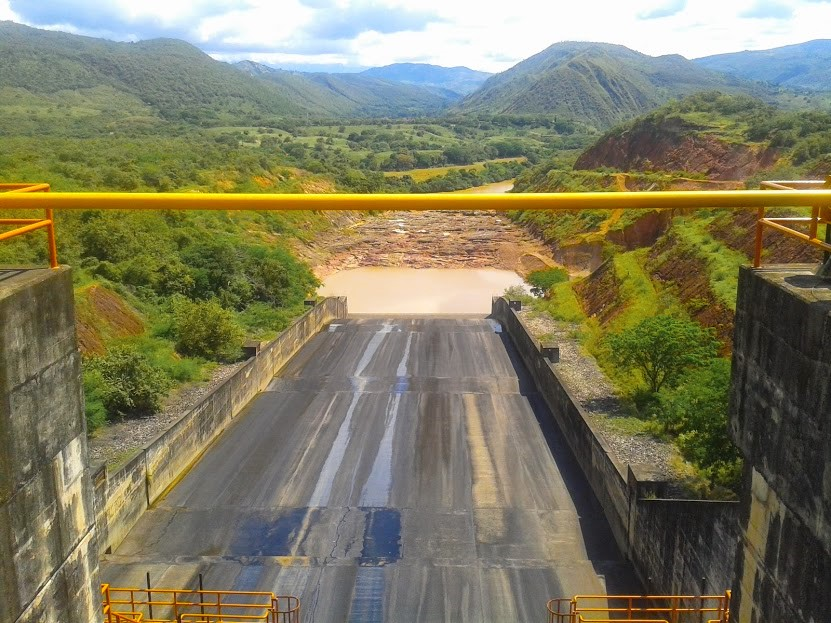
Betania Reservoir Dam
