= Coello, Tolima =

Coordinates: 4°20′N 74°55′W

- Municipality and town
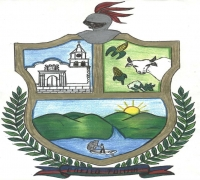
- Flag Coat of arms
- Nickname: Remanso de paz (eden of peace)
- Location of the municipality and town of Coello, Tolima in the Tolima Department of Colombia.
- Country: Colombia
- Department: Tolima Department

Government
  - Mayor: Santiago Herrera Yepes

Area
  - Total: 332.9 km^{2} (128.5 sq mi)
- Elevation: 329 m (1,079 ft)

Population (2017)
  - Total: 9,887
  - Density: 29.70/km^{2} (76.92/sq mi)
- Time zone: UTC-5 (Colombia Standard Time)

Coello is a town and municipality in the Tolima Department of Colombia, located by the Magdalena River, and some 137 km from the Colombian capital Bogotá. The town was founded on 5 July, 1627.

== History ==
In pre-Columbian time the Coello area was inhabited by the Cuniras, Metaymas, Tuamos y Doimas of the mighty native tribe the Pijaos'

The major of the pijaos resisted the Spanish conquerors with great ferocity, under the leading hand of the chief "Calarca" they started various battles against the Spanish.

== Tourism ==
- Coello River - the river which gave the town its name.
- Salto de lucha - a natural waterfall with clear and cold water. In the past used for recreational swimming
- Casa de la Cultura
