= Iquira =

Coordinates: 2°39′N 75°39′W

Íquira
- Municipality and town
- San Francisco de Íquira
- Flag Coat of arms
- Nickname: City of Light of Huila
- Location of the municipality and town of Íquira in the Huila Department of Colombia
- Country: Colombia
- Department: Huila Department
- Subregion: Northern
- Founded: 12 December 1694

Government
  - Mayor: Rubén Darío Castro Andrade (2024–2027)

Area
  - Municipality and town: 532 km^{2} (205 sq mi)
- Elevation: 1,400 m (4,600 ft)

Population (2025)
  - Municipality and town: 10,179
  - Density: 19.1/km^{2} (49.6/sq mi)
  - Urban: 2,763
- Time zone: UTC-5 (Colombia Standard Time)
- Website: iquira-huila.gov.co

Íquira (from Quechua Ikir = “cut land” and Kira = “frogs”, meaning “Land of Frogs”), and in the ancient Paez language Yavilco (“high mountains” or “place of observation”), is a municipality in the Huila Department, Colombia. According to the 2018 census, it has a population of 9,248 inhabitants.

It was founded by Francisco Martínez de Ospina in 1694.

The municipality covers an area of 532 km² and its municipal center lies at an altitude of about 1,400 metres above sea level.

Much of the local economy revolves around agricultural production, with coffee monoculture predominating. Extensive cattle ranching is also important. There are also plantations of cocoa, cassava, plantain and maize. The secondary economic sector is limited mainly to artisanal processing of dairy products and other traditional foods.

The municipality is known as the “City of Light of Huila” because the first hydroelectric plant in the department was built there.

== Toponymy ==
The name Íquira derives from the Quechua words ikir meaning “cut land” and kira meaning “frogs”, hence the interpretation “Land of Frogs”. According to the chronicles of Fray Pedro Simón, the name was given by Yanacona people who arrived during the expedition of Sebastián de Belalcázar.

== History ==
The earliest inhabitants of the region were the Paez indigenous peoples, who called the area Yavilco, meaning “high mountains”. They inhabited the region until the 15th century and formed part of the Pijao confederation that occupied the area during the Caribbean conquest.

When the Spanish arrived under Sebastián de Belalcázar, the region became inhabited by Yanacona people who spoke Quechua. They named the settlement Ikira or Íquira, meaning “place where many frogs live”, referring to the lagoons found in the area.

In 1612 Franciscan missionaries settled in the settlement and, with the aim of spreading the Catholic faith among the indigenous population, founded a doctrinal center in 1656 and dedicated the town to Saint Francis of Assisi.

In 1672 the captains Francisco Perdomo de Betancourt, Francisco Trujillo y Castro, Alfonso de Montealegre and others attempted to elevate the settlement to the category of town under the name Callejón de Íquira. This attempt was unsuccessful and the village was later abandoned.

By order of Francisco Martínez de Ospina, the settlement was officially founded in 1694 under the name San Francisco de Íquira. The town was established in what is now known as Callejón, specifically in the territories of the farms El Carmen, La Mestiza and San Mateo.

== Climate ==
Climate data for Íquira, elevation 1,095 m (3,593 ft), (1981–2010)
Month	Jan	Feb	Mar	Apr	May	Jun	Jul	Aug	Sep	Oct	Nov	Dec	Year
Mean daily maximum °C (°F)	27.4 (81.3)	27.4 (81.3)	27.6 (81.7)	27.4 (81.3)	27.3 (81.1)	27.5 (81.5)	28.0 (82.4)	28.2 (82.8)	28.8 (83.8)	28.1 (82.6)	27.1 (80.8)	27.1 (80.8)	27.6 (81.7)
Source: IDEAM
