= Alpujarra, Tolima =

Coordinates: 3°25′N 74°55′W

- Municipality and town
- Flag Coat of arms

- Location of the municipality and town of Alpujarra, Tolima in the Tolima Department of Colombia.
- Country: Colombia
- Department: Tolima Department
- Founded: August 7th, 1768
- Founder: Bartolomé Cardozo

Government
  - Mayor: Alexander Díaz Martínez

Area
  - Total: 473 km^{2} (183 sq mi)
- Elevation: 1,361 m (4,465 ft)

Population (2017)
  - Total: 4,963
- Time zone: UTC-5 (Colombia Standard Time)
- Website: http://www.alpujarra-tolima.gov.co

Alpujarra is a town and municipality in the Tolima department of Colombia.
