= 2023 in reptile paleontology =

This list of fossil reptiles described in 2023 is a list of new taxa of fossil reptiles that were described during the year 2023, as well as other significant discoveries and events related to reptile paleontology that occurred in 2023.

== Squamates ==
Name	Novelty	Status	Authors	Age	Type locality	Location	Notes	Images
Bauersaurus	Gen. et sp. nov	Valid	Čerňanský et al.	Eocene	Quercy Phosphorites Formation	France	A pan-gekkotan. The type species is B. cosensis.	
Bentiabasaurus	Gen. et sp. nov.		Polcyn, Schulp & Gonçalves	Late Cretaceous (Maastrichtian)	Mocuio Formation	Angola	A mosasaurine belonging to the group Plotosaurini. The type species is B. jacobsi.	
Bifurcodentodon	Gen. et sp. nov		Čerňanský et al.	Eocene (Ypresian)		Belgium	An iguanian belonging to the group Pleurodonta. The type species is B. ragei.	
Carentonosaurus algorensis	Sp. nov	Valid	Cabezuelo-Hernández & Pérez-García	Late Cretaceous (Cenomanian)	Arenas de Utrillas Formation	Spain	A member of Pythonomorpha.	
Carentonosaurus soaresi	Sp. nov		Pimentel et al.	Late Cretaceous (Cenomanian)		Portugal	A member of Pythonomorpha. Berrocal-Casero et al. 2024 placed it in the new genus Segurasaurus	
Cryptobicuspidon	Gen. et sp. nov		Carvalho & Santucci	Early Cretaceous (Aptian)	Quiricó Formation	Brazil	A member of Polyglyphanodontia. The type species is C. pachysymphysealis. Announced in 2023; the final article version will be published in 2024.	
Deccansaurus	Gen. et sp. nov		Yadav et al.	Late Cretaceous-Paleocene	Deccan Intertrappean Beds	India	A possible member of Cordyliformes. The type species is D. palaeoindicus.	
Ectenosaurus shannoni	Sp. nov	Valid	Kiernan & Ebersole	Late Cretaceous (Campanian)	Mooreville Chalk	United States (Alabama)	A mosasaur belonging to the subfamily Plioplatecarpinae.	
Ectenosaurus tlemonectes	Sp. nov	Valid	Kiernan & Ebersole	Late Cretaceous (Coniacian-Campanian)	Niobrara Formation	United States (Kansas)	A mosasaur belonging to the subfamily Plioplatecarpinae.	
Eoconstrictor barnesi	Sp. nov	Valid	Palci et al.	Eocene (Lutetian)	Geiseltal Lagerstätte	Germany	A snake belonging to the group Booidea.	
Eryx linxiaensis	Sp. nov.		Shi et al.	Miocene	Liushu Formation	China	A species of Eryx.	
Halisaurus hebae	Sp. nov		Shaker et al.	Late Cretaceous (Maastrichtian)	Dakhla Formation	Egypt	A mosasaur belonging to the subfamily Halisaurinae. Announced in 2023; the final article version will be published in 2024.	
Helioscopos	Gen. et sp. nov	Valid	Meyer et al.	Late Jurassic (Tithonian)	Morrison Formation	United States (Utah)	A member of the family Ardeosauridae. The type species is H. dickersonae.	
Jormungandr	Gen. et sp. nov.		Zietlow, Boyd & van Vranken	Late Cretaceous (Campanian)	Pierre Shale	United States (North Dakota)	A mosasaur belonging to the subfamily Mosasaurinae. The type species is J. walhallaensis.	
Limnoscansor	Gen. et sp. nov	Valid	Meyer et al.	Late Jurassic (Tithonian)	Solnhofen Limestone	Germany	A member of the family Ardeosauridae. The type species is "Homoeosaurus" digitatellus Grier 1914.	
Lygodactylus neglectus	Sp. nov	Valid	Ceríaco & Passos	Holocene		Brazil	A species of Lygodactylus.	
Megapterygius	Gen. et sp. nov	Valid	Konishi et al.	Late Cretaceous (Campanian/Maastrichtian)	Toyajo Formation	Japan	A mosasaurine mosasaur. The type species is M. wakayamaensis.	
Sarabosaurus	Gen. et sp. nov		Polcyn et al.	Late Cretaceous (Turonian)	Tropic Shale	United States (Utah)	A mosasaur belonging to the subfamily Plioplatecarpinae. The type species is S. dahli.	
Stelladens	Gen. et sp. nov	Valid	Longrich et al.	Late Cretaceous (Maastrichtian)	Ouled Abdoun Basin	Morocco	A mosasaurid belonging to the clade Mosasaurinae. Genus includes new species S. mysteriosus.	
Sullivanosaurus	Gen. et sp. nov		Čerňanský, Tabuce & Vidalenc	Eocene (MP 10–11)	Quercy Phosphorites Formation	France	A glyptosaurine. The type species is S. gallicus.	
Yaguarasaurus regiomontanus	Sp. nov		Rivera-Sylva et al.	Late Cretaceous (Turonian-Coniacian)	Agua Nueva Formation	Mexico	A mosasaur belonging to the subfamily Plioplatecarpinae. Announced in 2023; the final article version was published in 2024.	
Yechilacerta	Gen. et sp. nov		Xing, Niu, & Evans	Late Cretaceous (Maastrichtian)	Hekou Formation	China	A member of Polyglyphanodontia. The type species is Y. yingliangia.	

=== Squamate research ===
- Redescription of Palaeogekko risgoviensis is published by Villa (2023), who confirms the validity of this species as a distinct taxon, and interprets it as a non-eublepharid gekkonoid of uncertain affinities.
- Thorn et al. (2023) describe new fossil material of Aethesia frangens from the Pleistocene of Australia, interpret it as a large-bodied (approximately 2.4 kg) blue-tongued skink, and transfer it to the genus Tiliqua.
- Lacertid, blanid and anguid fossil material, including one of the oldest records of the genus Blanus reported to date, is described from the Early Miocene localities Montaigu-le-Blin and Crémat (France) by Čerňanský (2023), expanding known spatial and temporal distribution of Blanus cf. gracilis during the Early Miocene.
- Redescription of Uquiasaurus heptanodonta is published by Scanferla & Díaz-Fernández (2023), who interpret the type series of this species as a fossil bone assemblage composed by more than one species of Liolaemus, extending known fossil record of the latter genus.
- Hamilton et al. (2023) report the discovery of the fossil material of cf. Palaeosaniwa canadensis from the Campanian Wapiti Formation (Alberta, Canada), representing the northernmost definitive occurrence of Monstersauria in the Upper Cretaceous of North America reported to date.
- Loréal et al. (2023) describe new fossil material of Pseudopus pannonicus from the Neogene localities across Moldova, Russia and Ukraine, including fossils from the Turolian localities Gaverdovsky and Volchaya Balka in North Caucasus representing the easternmost or some of the easternmost known occurrences of this species, and revise the diagnostic features of P. pannonicus.
- Georgalis, Mennecart & Smith (2023) describe two teeth of a probable member of the genus Varanus from the Miocene deposits from the Hüenerbach locality (Switzerland), representing of the oldest occurrences of the genus from Europe.
- A specimen of the ammonite Mammites nodosoides, preserved with bite traces interpreted as most likely resulting from a lethal attack of a mosasaur directed at the apertural part of the ammonite with the head and arm crown, is described from the Turonian Bílá Hora Formation (Czech Republic) by Mazuch et al. (2023).
- Evidence from tooth microwear of mosasaurs from the type area for the Maastrichtian, interpreted as indicative of preferences for vertebrate and/or invertebrate prey in different mosasaur taxa but not indicative of strict dietary partitioning, is presented by Holwerda et al. (2023).
- A humerus of a mosasaurine related to Plotosaurus beninsoni and members of the genus Mosasaurus is described from the Maastrichtian López de Bertodano Formation (Antarctica) by O'Gorman et al. (2023), expanding known diversity of Antarctic mosasaurines.
- LeBlanc et al. (2023) report that tooth replacement in extant snakes occurs by resorption of dentine by odontoclasts from within the pulp of the tooth, and that this mechanism was already present in Yurlunggur and Portugalophis.
- A study on the evolution of the snake brain, based on data from extant and fossil taxa, is published by Macrì et al. (2023), who interpret their findings as indicative of a burrowing lifestyle with opportunistic behavior at the origin of the crown group of snakes.
- A palaeophiid vertebra tentatively referred to the genus Pterosphenus is described from the Eocene Ameki Formation (Nigeria) by Georgalis (2023), expanding known diversity of palaeophiids from Nigeria.
- Averianov (2023) describes new fossil material of Pterosphenus muruntau from the Eocene (Bartonian) deposits from the Dzheroi 2 locality in the Central Kyzylkum Desert (Uzbekistan), and considers P. muruntau to be a valid species.
- Alfonso-Rojas et al. (2023) describe new fossil material of Colombophis from the Miocene La Victoria and Villavieja formations (Colombia), and interpret its anatomy as supporting the placement of Colombophis among the alethinophidians.
- Shi et al. (2023) describe an assemblage of early Pliocene snake fossils entombed with the mammalian fauna from Houxushan (Queshan, Henan, China), and interpret the studied fossils as indicative of a warmer and more humid climate in this region during the early Pliocene.
- Bolet (2023) describes an assemblage of squamate fossils from the Eocene locality of Mazaterón (Spain), providing evidence of the persistence of glyptosaur and anguine anguids, iguanids and lacertids through most of the Iberian Eocene, and including one of the oldest records of amphisbaenians in Europe after the apparent gap in their European fossil record in the MP11–MP15 interval.
- Lofgren et al. (2023) describe new fossil material of squamates from the Uintan, Chadronian and Whitneyan strata in Montana (United States), including the first records of varanids, Calamagras and a possible member of the genus Peltosaurus from the Tertiary depositional basins of southwest Montana, and the first record of Aciprion formosum from the state and from the Whitneyan strata.
- Georgalis et al. (2023) describe fossil material of lizards and snakes from the Miocene localities in Anatolia (Turkey), including fossil remains tentatively referred to chameleons, potentially representing the oldest occurrences of chameleons from Asia reported to date.

== Ichthyosauromorphs ==
=== Ichthyosauromorph research ===
- A study on the skull morphology of Hupehsuchus nanchangensis, based on data from new specimens from the Lower Triassic Jialingjiang Formation (China), is published by Fang et al. (2023), who find the shape of the skull roof and snout of H. nanchangensis to be highly convergent with modern baleen whales, and interpret Hupehsuchus as likely employing continuous ram filter feeding as in extant bowhead and right whales.
- Kear et al. (2023) describe ichthyopterygian fossil material (including 11 vertebral centra which are substantially larger than those of typical basal ichthyosauriforms) from the Lower Triassic Vikinghøgda Formation (Svalbard, Norway), interpreting the internal structure of the studied bones as indicating that they belonged to a fully pelagic animal, and argue that ichthyosauromorphs might have originated before the Permian–Triassic extinction event.
- Engelschiøn et al. (2023) use radiography and computed tomography to reveal taxonomically significant details of the skeletal anatomy of a mixosaurid specimen from the Middle Triassic Botneheia Formation (Svalbard, Norway), and interpret it as a member of the genus Phalarodon with affinities to P. atavus.
- A study on three gravid Mixosaurus specimens from the Middle Triassic Besano Formation at the Monte San Giorgio locality at the Swiss-Italian border is published by Miedema et al. (2023), who report that two of the studied specimens were preserved with fetuses with tail-first birth position while the third specimen was preserved with fetuses with head-first birth position, propose that a slight preference for tail-first birth likely arose at the base of the Merriamosauria, and argue that fetal orientation at birth in ichthyosaurs was more likely to be related to expulsion mechanics during birth or to maternal stress induced from the fetal orientation during pregnancy than to the need for reduction of asphyxiation risk.
- A study on the cranial ontogeny of Mixosaurus cornalianus, providing evidence of developmental patterns in the early ontogenetic stages that were reminiscent of the probable ancestral reptile condition, is published by Miedema et al. (2023).
- A study on the ecomorphological variation of skulls and teeth of members of the genus Temnodontosaurus, providing evidence of a range of configurations allowing prey to be captured and processed in different ways by members of different species and possibly indicative of niche partitioning, is published by Bennion et al. (2023).
- Redescription of the holotypes of Grendelius pseudoscythicus and G. zhuravlevi is published by Zverkov, Arkhangelsky & Stenshin (2023), who consider both species to be valid, indicating the presence of at least three species of Grendelius in the Middle Russian Sea during the latest Jurassic, and argue that there is insufficient evidence for synonymy between the genera Brachypterygius and Grendelius.
- Delsett et al. (2023) compare the ossified hyoid elements in ophthalmosaurid ichthyosaurs and toothed whales, and report that, based on hyoid shape, suction feeding seems to never have evolved in ichthyosaurs.
- Reassessment of the history and identity of the ichthyosaur specimens from the Posidonia Shale housed in the Paleontological Collection of Tübingen University is published by Stöhr & Werneburg (2023).
- Motani & Shimada (2023) providence evidence that derived ichthyosaurs, modern whales, tunas and lamnid sharks share characteristics of caudal vertebrae related to the mechanics of thunniform swimming, and allowing identifications of thunniform swimmers in the fossil record.

== Sauropterygians ==
Name	Novelty	Status	Authors	Age	Type locality	Country	Notes	Images
Chubutinectes	Gen. et sp. nov		O'Gorman et al.	Late Cretaceous (Maastrichtian)	La Colonia Formation	Argentina	An elasmosaurid. The type species is C. carmeloi.	
Chusaurus	Gen. et sp. nov		Liu et al.	Early Triassic (Olenekian)	Jialingjiang Formation	China	A member of the family Pachypleurosauridae. The type species is C. xiangensis.	
Lorrainosaurus	Gen. et comb. nov		Sachs et al.	Middle Jurassic (Bajocian)	Marnes de Gravelott	France	A thalassophonean pliosaur. The type species is "Simolestes" keileni.	
Luopingosaurus	Gen. et sp. nov	Valid	Xu et al.	Middle Triassic (Anisian)	Guanling Formation	China	A member of the family Pachypleurosauridae. The type species is L. imparilis.	
Martinectes	Gen. et comb. nov	In press	Clark, O'Keefe, & Slack	Late Cretaceous (Campanian)	Pierre Shale	United States (Wyoming, South Dakota)	A polycotylid. The type species is "Dolichorhynchops" bonneri. Announced in 2023; the final article version will be published in 2024.	
Prosaurosphargis	Gen. et sp. nov	Valid	Wolniewicz et al.	Early Triassic (Olenekian)	Jialingjiang Formation	China	A saurosphargid. The type species is P. yingzishanensis.	
Scalamagnus	Gen. et comb. nov	In press	Clark, O'Keefe, & Slack	Late Cretaceous (Turonian)	Tropic Shale	United States (Utah)	A polycotylid. The type species is "Dolichorhynchops" tropicensis. Announced in 2023; the final article version will be published in 2024.	
Styxosaurus rezaci	Sp. nov	Valid	Armour Smith & O'Keefe	Late Cretaceous (Cenomanian)		United States (Nebraska)		
Unktaheela	Gen. et sp. nov	In press	Clark, O'Keefe, & Slack	Late Cretaceous (Campanian)	Sharon Springs Formation	United States (Wyoming, South Dakota)	A polycotylid. The type species is U. specta. Announced in 2023; the final article version will be published in 2024.	

=== Sauropterygian research ===
- A study on the ecomorphological diversification of Middle Triassic eosauropterygians, providing evidence of evolution of anatomically diverse skulls and teeth (likely related to different feeding specializations of pachypleurosauroids, nothosauroids and pistosauroids) and more homogeneous postcranial skeletons, as well as evidence of regional variations in morphological diversity, is published by Laboury et al. (2023).
- An aggregation of bones of at least three individuals of Keichousaurus hui, interpreted as a likely regurgitalith probably produced by a near-shore sauropterygian such as Nothosaurus or Lariosaurus, is described from the Middle Triassic Xingyi Fauna (Guizhou, China) by Ye, Sun & Yao (2023).
- Li et al. (2023) report preservation of the digestive tract with food remains in specimens of Keichousaurus hui from the Zhuganpo Member of the Falang Formation (China), and reconstruct the internal distribution and organ composition of the digestive tract of K. hui.
- Morphological and histological evidence interpreted as indicative of puberty as one of the four life stages is reported in the fossil material of Keichousaurus by Li et al. (2023).
- New specimen of Yunguisaurus, providing new information on the anatomy of the skull in this taxon, is described from the Ladinian Zhuganpo Member of the Falang Formation (China) by Lu et al. (2023).
- Reassessment of Trematospondylus macrocephalus is published by Sachs et al. (2023), who interpret the taxon as a dubious rhomaleosaurid.
- Teeth of freshwater pliosauroids, possibly representing a transitional taxon between the Middle Jurassic and Late Jurassic pliosaurids, are described from the Middle Jurassic Xintiangou Formation (China) by Ma et al. (2023).
- Vertebrae belonging to a pliosaurid estimated as being 9.8 to 14.4 m in length are described from the Kimmeridgian Kimmeridge Clay (United Kingdom) by Martill et al. (2023).
- Fossil material of pliosaurids, including two specimens whose skull size approached that of Megacephalosaurus, is described from the Cenomanian and Turonian of the Yezo Group (Hokkaido, Japan) by Sato et al. (2023).
- A study on the skeletal anatomy and phylogenetic relationships of Luskhan itilensis is published by Fischer et al. (2023).
- Redescription of "Plesiosaurus" bavaricus and description of the fossil material of a member of the same or related species from the Posidonia Shale (Germany) is published by Sachs, Abel & Madzia (2023), who interpret the studied fossils as indicative of the presence of a distinct plesiosaur taxon in the upper Lower Jurassic of the Posidonia Shale of Germany.
- D'Angelo et al. (2023) describe a mature elasmosaurid specimen from the Maastrichtian Calafate Formation (Argentina), with histological features of the phalanx and vertebral apophysis otherwise found in juvenile individuals, and interpret this finding as contradicting the hypotheses that proposed that the maturation of elasmosaurid involved a shift in bone density which was related to migration from coastal waters to the open sea.
- O'Gorman & Otero (2023) revise the fossil material of Late Cretaceous short-necked plesiosaurs from New Zealand, and argue that only one specimen from the Tahora Formation and one from the Conway Formation can be confidently referred to the family Polycotylidae, while another specimen from the Conway Formation and one specimen from uncertain locality can be referred to this family with doubts.
- May et al. (2023) describe possible pliosaurid and possible small-bodied plesiosaur fossil material from the Upper Jurassic Malone Formation, representing the first Jurassic vertebrate fossils from Texas reported to date.
- Fossil trackway probably produced by a plesiosaur swimming in contact with the mud at the bottom of the sea is described from the Upper Jurassic–Lower Cretaceous Maiolica Formation (Italy) by Natali & Leonardi (2023), who name a new ichnotaxon Coneroichnus marinus.
- A study on the skeletal maturity status of known plesiosaur skeletons, indicating that determination of the ontogenetic stage of the studied specimens may be confounded by paedomorphism (especially in later taxa), is published by Araújo & Smith (2023).

== Turtles ==
Name	Novelty	Status	Authors	Age	Type locality	Location	Notes	Images
Abalakemys	Gen. et sp. nov	Valid	Pérez-García	Late Cretaceous (Maastrichtian)	Farin-Doutchi Formation	Niger	A member of the family Bothremydidae. The type species is A. chapmanae.	
Astrochelys rogerbouri	Sp. nov	Valid	Kehlmaier et al.	Holocene		Madagascar	A tortoise, a species of Astrochelys.	
Carettochelys niahensis	Sp. nov	In press	White et al.	Cenozoic (probably late Oligocene or younger in age)		Malaysia	A member of the family Carettochelyidae.	
Floridemys nancei	Sp. nov	Valid	Weems	Miocene	St. Marys Formation	United States (Maryland)	A tortoise.	
Gehennachelys	Gen. et comb. nov		Adrian, Smith, & Noto	Late Cretaceous (Cenomanian)	Lewisville Formation	United States (Texas)	A member of the family Baenidae; a new genus for "Trinitichelys" maini Adrain et al. (2019).	
Kansastega	Nom. nov		McDavid & Hooks	Late Cretaceous	Niobrara Chalk	United States (Kansas)	A member of the family Protostegidae; a replacement name for Microstega Hooks (1998).	
Khargachelys	Gen. et sp. nov		AbdelGawad et al.	Late Cretaceous (Campanian)	Quseir Formation	Egypt	A member of Bothremydidae. The type species is K. caironensis	
Nanhsiungchelys yangi	Sp. nov	Valid	Ke et al.	Late Cretaceous	Dafeng Formation	China	A member of the family Nanhsiungchelyidae.	
Podocnemis tatacoensis	Sp. nov	Valid	Cadena & Vanegas	Miocene (Serravallian)	La Victoria Formation	Colombia	A species of Podocnemis.	
Proadocus	Gen. et sp. nov		Kim et al.	Early Cretaceous	Hasandong Formation	South Korea	A member of the family Adocidae. The type species is P. hadongensis.	
Striatochelys	Gen. et sp. nov	Valid	Massonne et al.	Eocene (Bartonian–Priabonian)	Na Duong Formation	Vietnam	A pan-trionychid. The type species is S. baba.	
Titanochelon schleichi	Sp. nov		Pappa, Vlachos & Moser	Miocene (Burdigalian/Langhian boundary)		Germany	A tortoise.	

=== Turtle research ===
- A study on the body size evolution in turtles is published by Farina et al. (2023), who interpret their findings as indicating that body size was influenced by lineage-specific specializations, such as habitat choice, rather than global trends.
- A study on the topological organization of the turtle skull throughout the evolutionary history of turtles is published by Miller et al. (2023), who interpret their findings as indicating that turtles have a derived cranial topology which was established early in turtle evolutionary history and subsequently conserved.
- Szczygielski & Piechowski (2023) describe the anatomy of the limbs and girdles of Proterochersis, reporting the presence of a mosaic of characteristics suggesting either terrestrial or aquatic ecology.
- A study on the limb bone histology in Proterochersis porebensis and Proganochelys quenstedtii, providing evidence of general microstructural patterns typical for extant turtles and of faster growth during early life stages in P. quenstedtii than in P. porebensis, is published by Szczygielski et al. (2023).
- New specimen of Naomichelys speciosa, providing new information on the anatomy and intraspecific variation in this species, is described from the Lower Cretaceous Cloverly Formation (Montana, United States) by Lawver & Garner (2023).
- Joyce et al. (2023) describe fossil material of Helochelydra nopcsai from the Lower Cretaceous strata in North Rhine-Westphalia (Germany), extending known geographic range of this species and providing new information on its anatomy.
- Tong et al. (2023) describe a skull of a member of the species Solemys gaudryi from the Upper Cretaceous (Campanian) Bastide Neuve locality (Var, France), providing new information on the skull anatomy of helochelydrid turtles.
- Chou et al. (2023) describe a new specimen of Chengyuchelys latimarginalis from the Upper Jurassic Shangshaximiao Formation (China), expanding known geographical distribution of this species and providing new information on its intraspecific variation.
- The first specimen of Solnhofia parsonsi preserving largely complete and articulated limbs is described from the Kimmeridgian Torleite Formation (Germany) by Augustin et al. (2023), who interpret this finding as indicating that S. parsonsi lacked stiffened paddles otherwise present in more pelagic marine turtles, and argue against interpreting the presence flexible flippers in fossil turtles as evidence for freshwater lifestyle by itself.
- Pérez-García, Camilo & Ortega (2023) describe new fossil material of Hylaeochelys kappa from the Tithonian Freixial Formation (Portugal), providing new information on the anatomy and intraspecific variability in this species.
- A specimen of Eodortoka cf. morellana, representing both the oldest occurrence of the family Dortokidae reported to date and the first record of the group from the United Kingdom, is described from the Lower Cretaceous Wessex Formation by Jacobs et al. (2023).
- Cadena et al. (2023) describe new fossil material of Chelus lewisi from the Miocene Socorro Formation (Urumaco, Venezuela) and of Chelus colombiana from the La Victoria Formation (Tatacoa, Colombia), and interpret the anatomy of the studied fossils as supporting the validity of both species.
- Martín-Jiménez & Pérez-García (2023) present the reconstruction of the skull and neuroanatomical structures of the holotype of Euraxemys essweini.
- A study on the ecology of Araripemys barretoi is published by Batista, Carvalho & de la Fuente (2023).
- Bogado et al. (2023) describe new fossil material of Roxochelys from the Upper Cretaceous Presidente Prudente Formation (Brazil), and provide an emended diagnosis for Roxochelys.
- Martín-Jiménez & Pérez-García (2023) provide a three-dimensional reconstruction of the anatomical and neuroanatomical cranial structures of Neochelys arenarum.
- A study on the anatomy of the mandible of Glyptops ornatus is published by Evers (2023), who interprets G. ornatus as a likely active aquatic hunter.
- Smith, Berg & Adrian (2023) describe a well-preserved skull of a specimen of Plesiobaena antiqua from the Judith River Formation (Montana, United States), providing new information on the morphology of the middle and inner ear and endocast of baenids.
- Description of a partial skeleton of Denazinemys nodosa from the Campanian Kaiparowits Formation (Utah, United States) and a study on the phylogenetic affinities of this taxon is published by Spicher et al. (2023).
- Description of the anatomy of the skull and mandible of Plastomenus thomasii, and a study on the phylogenetic relationships and the evolutionary history of softshell turtles, is published by Evers, Chapelle & Joyce (2023).
- Redescription of Rafetus bohemicus is published by Chroust et al. (2023).
- Cadena & Combita-Romero (2023) describe protostegid fossil material from the Lower Cretaceous (Valanginian) Rosablanca Formation (Colombia), representing both the earliest protostegid record reported to date and the largest Early Cretaceous protostegid worldwide, providing evidence of early evolution of large size in protostegids.
- A study on the long bone microstructure of Protostega gigas is published by Wilson (2023), who interprets her findings as indicating that P. gigas, unlike the more basal protostegid Desmatochelys, had rapid bone growth patterns similar to those of extant leatherback sea turtles.
- Purported plant fossils from the Lower Cretaceous Paja Formation (Colombia), originally described as Sphenophyllum colombianum, are reinterpreted by Palma-Castro et al. (2023) as hatchling marine turtles, representing the first finding of hatchlings turtle carapaces from northwestern South America reported to date.
- Fossil material of a sea turtle is described from the Lutetian Santiago Formation, California by Poust, Holroyd & Deméré (2023), providing evidence of the presence of sea turtles in North Pacific during the middle Eocene.
- Zvonok, Benitskiy & Danilov (2023) describe new fossil material of Tasbacka aldabergeni from the Paleogene (Paleocene or Ypresian) Kudinovka locality (Rostov Oblast, Russia), including the most complete postcranial skeleton of a member of this species, providing new information on its anatomy.
- A carapace of a sea turtle representing the oldest record of the genus Lepidochelys reported to date is described from the Miocene Chagres Formation (Panama) by Cadena, De Gracia & Combita-Romero (2023), who report evidence of exceptional preservation of bone microstructure, including remains of blood vessels, collagen fibers, osteocytes with possible DNA.
- A study on the diversification of tortoises throughout their evolutionary history is published by Silveira et al. (2023).
- A study on the bone histology of fossil and extant angulate tortoises from South Africa, providing evidence of impact of environmental conditions on the growth of studied tortoises, is published by Bhat, Chinsamy & Parkington (2023).
- Delfino et al. (2023) describe Late Pleistocene fossils representing the first fossil material of Testudo hermanni hermanni from Sicily reported to date.
- A study on the relationship of body size to climate and on the role of metabolism in governing size in turtles is published by Parker et al. (2023), who report that the Plio-Pleistocene fossil record of turtles from the Shungura Formation (Ethiopia) included tortoises which were significantly larger than any extant African taxon, but aquatic turtles did not reach significantly larger maximum sizes than extant eastern African turtles; the authors find the studied fossil record of turtles to be consistent with habitat reconstructions for the Shungura Formation, interpret it as indicating that temperature-dependent metabolism likely wasn't a dominant factor for body size sorting in turtles from the Shungura Formation, and argue that the extinction of the largest eastern African tortoises may have been driven, in part, by human exploitation.
- Revision of the fossil material of Paleogene turtles from Eastern Europe is published by Zvonok & Danilov (2023).

== Archosauriformes ==
=== Other archosauriforms ===
Name	Novelty	Status	Authors	Age	Type locality	Location	Notes	Images
Colossosuchus	Gen. et sp. nov		Datta & Ray	Late Triassic	Tiki Formation	India	A mystriosuchine phytosaur. The type species is C. techniensis.	Colossosuchus (top)
Jupijkam	Gen. et sp. nov		Brownstein	Late Triassic (Norian-Rhaetian)	Blomidon Formation	Canada	A mystriosuchine phytosaur. The type species is J. paleofluvialis.	
Kuruxuchampsa	Gen. et sp. nov		Paes-Neto et al.	Late Triassic (Carnian)	Santa Cruz do Sul Sequence of the Santa Maria Supersequence	Brazil	A rhadinosuchine proterochampsid. The type species is K. dornellesi.	
Mystriosuchus alleroq	Sp. nov		López-Rojas et al.	Late Triassic	Malmros Klint Formation	Greenland	A mystriosuchine phytosaur.	
Pinheirochampsa	Gen. et sp. nov		Paes-Neto et al.	Triassic (Ladinian-Carnian)	Pinheiros-Chiniquá Sequence of the Santa Maria Supersequence	Brazil	A rhadinosuchine proterochampsid. The type species is P. rodriguesi.	
Samsarasuchus	Gen. et sp. nov	Valid	Ezcurra et al.	Early Triassic (Induan)	Panchet Formation	India	A chasmatosuchine proterosuchid. The type species is S. pamelae.	

==== Archosauriform research ====
- A study on the bone histology of Chanaresuchus bonapartei and Tropidosuchus romeri from the Chañares Formation (Argentina) is published by Garcia Marsà et al. (2023), who interpret their findings as indicative of variability of the developmental patterns in the studied taxa, as well as suggestive of their terrestrial lifestyle.
- A study on the locomotor capabilities of Euparkeria capensis is published by Demuth, Wiseman & Hutchinson (2023), who conclude that it is unlikely that Euparkeria was facultatively bipedal, and was probably quadrupedal.

== Other reptiles ==
Name	Novelty	Status	Authors	Age	Type locality	Location	Notes	Images
Alamitosphenos	Gen. et sp. nov	In press	Agnolín et al.	Late Cretaceous (Maastrichtian)	Los Alamitos Formation	Argentina	A sphenodontid rhynchocephalian. The type species is A. mineri. Announced in 2023; the final article version will be published in 2024.	
Austronaga	Gen. et sp. nov	Valid	Wang, Lei & Li	Middle Triassic (Anisian)	Guanling Formation	China	A member of the family Dinocephalosauridae. The type species is A. minuta.	
Beesiiwo	Gen. et sp. nov		Fitch et al.	Late Triassic (Carnian)	Popo Agie Formation	United States (Wyoming)	A rhynchosaur belonging to the subfamily Hyperodapedontinae. The type species is B. cooowuse.	
Clevosaurus nicholasi	Sp. nov		Bhat et al.	Late Triassic	Tiki Formation	India		
Gansurhinus naobaogouensis	Sp. nov		Liu	Late Permian	Naogaobou Formation	China	A member of the family Captorhinidae.	
Gracilicollum	Gen. et sp. nov		Wang et al.	Middle Triassic (Anisian)	Guanling Formation	China	An early diverging archosauromorph with a long neck, likely a tanystropheid. The type species is G. latens.	
Halgaitosaurus	Gen. et sp. nov	Valid	Henrici et al.	Carboniferous (Gzhelian)	Halgaito Formation	United States (Utah)	A member of Araeoscelidia. The type species is H. gregarius.	
Hwiccewyrm	Gen. et sp. nov	In press	Butler et al.	Late Triassic	Magnesian Conglomerate	United Kingdom	A member of the family Procolophonidae belonging to the subfamily Leptopleuroninae. The type species is H. trispiculum.	
Luxisaurus	Gen. et sp. nov	Valid	Lu & Liu	Middle Triassic (Anisian)	Guanling Formation	China	A member of the family Tanystropheidae. The type species is L. terrestris.	
Rutiotomodon	Gen. et sp. nov	Valid	Sues & Schoch	Middle Triassic (Ladinian)	Erfurt Formation	Germany	A member of the family Trilophosauridae. The type species is R. tytthos.	
Senectosaurus	Gen. et sp. nov	Valid	Boyarinova & Golubev	Permian		Russia (Orenburg Oblast)	A pareiasaur. The type species is S. karamzini.	
Tramuntanasaurus	Gen. et sp. nov		Matamales-Andreu et al.	Permian	Port des Canonge Formation	Spain	A member of the family Captorhinidae belonging to the subfamily Moradisaurinae. The type species is T. tiai.	
Wirtembergia	Gen. et sp. nov		Sues & Schoch	Middle Triassic (Ladinian)	Erfurt Formation	Germany	An early rhynchocephalian. The type species is W. hauboldae.	

=== Other reptile research ===
- Redescription and a study on the affinities of Coelostegus prothales is published by Klembara et al. (2023).
- Redescription of the holotype specimen of Delorhynchus cifellii is published by Rowe, Bevitt & Reisz (2023).
- Pohlmann et al. (2023) describe new cranial material of Procolophon trigoniceps from the Sanga do Cabral Formation (Brazil), preserving evidence of temporal fenestration, and interpret the recurrent presence and varying morphology of temporal fenestrae in P. trigoniceps as supporting its characterization as an anomalous trait within the species.
- Description of new fossil material of Libognathus sheddi from the Upper Triassic Cooper Canyon Formation (Texas, United States), providing new information on the skull anatomy of this procolophonid, is published by Mueller et al. (2023).
- Van den Brandt et al. (2023) provide the first volumetric body mass estimate of Bradysaurus baini.
- A study on the structure and placement of the osteoderm cover of Scutosaurus tuberculatus is published by Boyarinova & Golubev (2023).
- New information on the anatomy of the palate and mandible of Youngina capensis is presented by Hunt et al. (2023), who interpret the anatomy of the studied bones as supporting the phylogenetic placement of Youngina as an early diverging neodiapsid.
- A study on the morphology of the femora of members of Drepanosauromorpha, interpreted as indicative of increased capacity for femoral adduction and protraction relative to most other Permo-Triassic diapsids, is published by Pritchard et al. (2023).
- A study on the anatomy of the hindlimbs of Megalancosaurus preonensis and M. endennae is published by Renesto & Saller (2023), who interpret the differences in the skeletal anatomy of the studied drepanosauromorphs as indicating that the two species may have exploited different microhabitats in the arboreal environment.
- Browstein et al. (2023) exclude Cryptovaranoides microlanius from the crown group of Squamata, and consider it to be a neodiapsid of unclear placement with possible affinities to early archosauromorphs.
- Roese-Miron et al. (2023) compare the endocasts of Clevosaurus brasiliensis and extant tuatara, reporting that the reptilian encephalization quotient of C. brasiliensis in much lower than that of the tuatara, and providing evidence of a previously undocumented neuroanatomical diversity among rhynchocephalians.
- Probable sphenodontian burrows are described from the Lower Cretaceous (Aptian) Cerro Barcino Formation (Argentina) by Melchor et al. (2023).
- Redescription of Wapitisaurus problematicus is published by Bastiaans, Buffa & Scheyer (2023), who reinterpret this reptile as a member of Thalattosauroidea.
- A study comparing bone histology of Askeptosaurus italicus and an unnamed thalattosauroid from the Vester Formation (Oregon, United States), providing evidence of different growth patterns in the studied thalattosaurs, is published by Klein et al. (2023).
- Redescription of the holotype of Wayaosaurus bellus is published by Chai et al. (2023), who consider Miodentosaurus brevis to be a possible junior synonym of W. bellus, and interpret thalattosaur morphology as indicating that, unlike sauropterygians and ichthyosauriforms, thalattosaurs night have been adapted only to the nearshore environments.
- A study on the stable carbon, oxygen and sulfur isotope compositions of bones of two specimens of Odontochelys is published by Goedert et al. (2023), who interpret their findings as indicating that Odontochelys was herbivorous and lived in a coastal marine environment.
- Jiang et al. (2023) report the discovery of an embryo of a member of the genus Ikechosaurus from the Lower Cretaceous Jiufotang Formation (China) preserved inside a parchment-shelled egg, interpret the ossification sequence of the embryo as confirming the placement of choristoderans within Archosauromorpha, and interpret this finding as suggesting that the ancestral amniote displayed extended embryo retention, including viviparity.
- Dudgeon, Mallon & Evans (2023) describe a specimen of Champsosaurus lindoei from the Two Medicine Formation (Montana, United States), representing the first confirmed record of this species outside of Dinosaur Provincial Park and its vicinity, and providing evidence that Champsosaurus was able to live in drier environments than previously thought.
- Spiekman & Mujal (2023) describe two specimens of Tanystropheus (belonging to the species T. hydroides and T. longobardicus) from the Middle Triassic Monte San Giorgio Lagerstätte with completely severed necks, and interpret the studied specimens as likely victims of a predatory attack, providing evidence that the long neck of Tanystropheus might have been susceptible to predation.
- Redescription of Anisodontosaurus greeri is published by Foffa et al. (2023), who provide new information on the anatomy of this reptile, supporting its referral to the clade Trilophosauridae.
- A study on microwear patterns in teeth of trilophosaurids is published by Mellett et al. (2023), who interpret their findings as suggestive of niche partitioning in closely related trilophosaurids in the Norian American Southwest.
- Redescription of the skull of the holotype of Bentonyx sidensis, including description of previously obscured anatomical details, is published by Sethapanichsakul, Coram & Benton (2023).
- A study on tooth implantation in rhynchosaurs and on changes in their teeth and jaw morphology as they aged is published by Sethapanichsakul, Coram & Benton (2023), who interpret the fossil record of rhynchosaurs as indicative of two phases of diversification, first in the Anisian, and second following the Carnian pluvial episode.
- Redescription of the holotype specimen of Prolacerta broomi is published by Sobral (2023).

== Reptiles in general ==
- A study on the relationship between femoral microstructure and posture in extant reptiles, and on its implications for the reconstruction of the posture of extinct reptiles, is published by Gônet et al. (2023), who find that the posture can be reliably inferred for extinct reptile taxa that preceded and followed the quadruped/biped and sprawling/erect transitions, but also that the inferences are more questionable for taxa contemporary with these transitions.
- A study on the nasal passage shapes and nasal airflow patterns in extant diapsids, comparing simulated airflow patterns in nasal passages without soft tissues (representing the typical degree of nasal passage preservation in fossils) and with soft tissues, is published by Bourke & Witmer (2023), who interpret their findings as indicating that previous nasal passage reconstructions in extinct species might overestimate airway size, which might affect estimates of physiological capacities of the nasal passages.
- Hoffman, Hancox & Nesbitt (2023) describe an assemblage of teeth of diapsid reptiles from the Lower Triassic Burgersdorp Formation (South Africa), report the presence of seven tooth morphotypes which are distinct but show limited morphological disparity, and interpret this finding as confirming that the recovery of diverse ecosystems after the Permian–Triassic extinction event was delayed until the Middle or even the Late Triassic.
- Zverkov et al. (2023) describe Late Cretaceous reptile fossils from the Pyasina River, Tanama River and Kheta River basins (Siberia, Russia), representing the northernmost Cretaceous Eurasian occurrences of plesiosaurs, turtles and possibly mosasaurids reported to date, and including immature plesiosaur fossils which might indicate that the Late Cretaceous shallow waters in the studied area were a breeding and nursery area for plesiosaurs.
- A study on the competition for prey between Miocene mammalian and reptilian predators at La Venta (Colombia) is published by Wilson & Parker (2023), who interpret their findings as indicative of limited competition for resources among the carnivore guild compared to the most similar extant communities, a dominant role of crocodyliform predators in the studied community, and low predation pressure which might have resulted in overpopulation leading to feeding stress in the notoungulate species Pericotoxodon platignathus.
