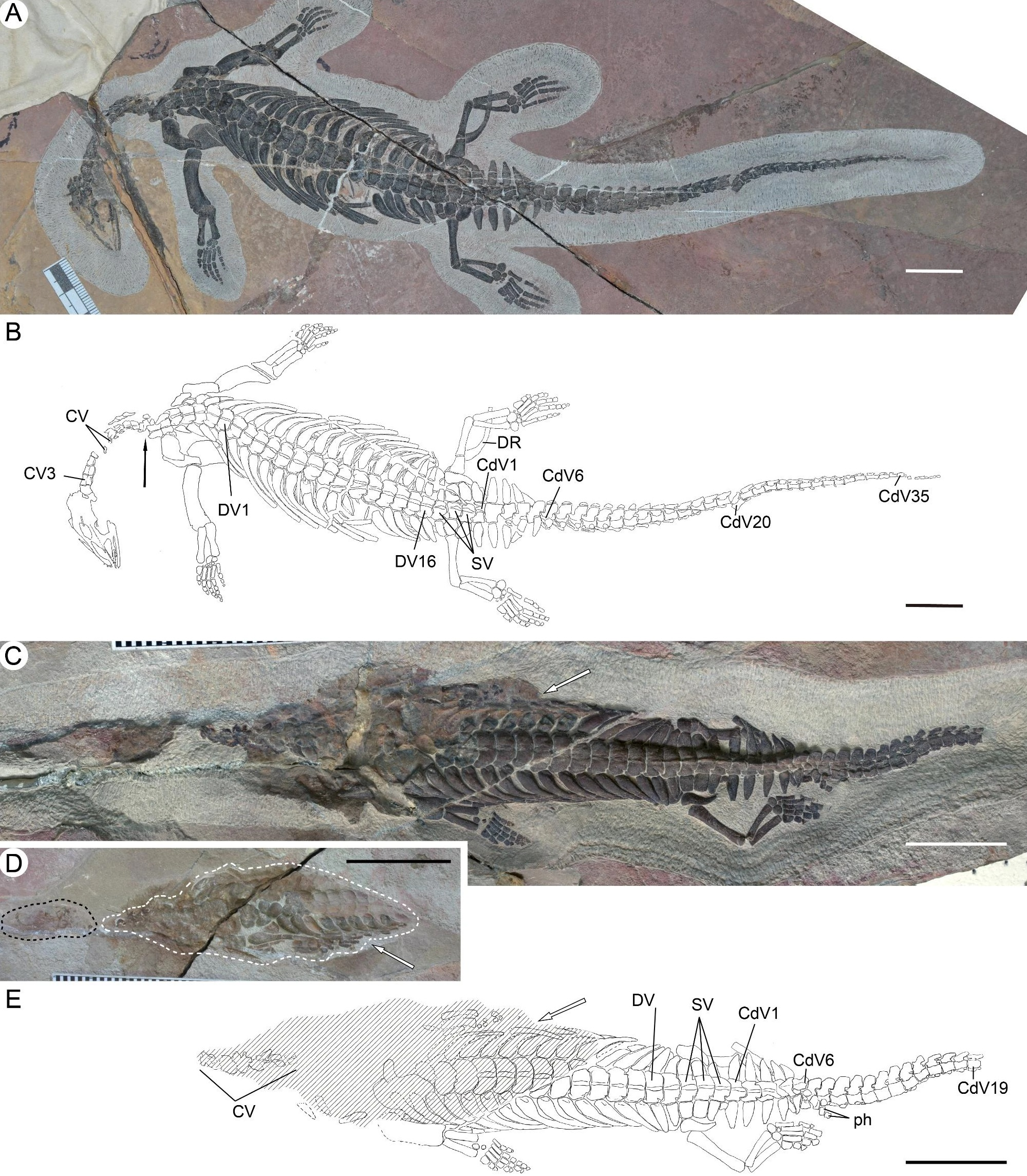
- Two specimens of Chusaurus

Scientific classification
- Domain: Eukaryota
- Kingdom: Animalia
- Phylum: Chordata
- Class: Reptilia
- Superorder: †Sauropterygia
- Family: †Pachypleurosauridae
- Genus: †Chusaurus; Liu et al., 2023
- Species: †C. xiangensis

Binomial name
- †Chusaurus xiangensis Liu et al., 2023

= Chusaurus =

Chusaurus Temporal range: Early Triassic (Spathian)

Genus of pachypleurosaurid reptiles

Chusaurus is an extinct genus of pachypleurosaurid known from the Early Triassic Nanzhang-Yuan’an Fauna in the South China block. The two known specimens of Chusaurus were found in Hubei Province, China, dating back to the Olenekian age of the Early Triassic period. The genus contains a single species, Chusaurus xiangensis

== Discovery and naming ==
The fossils of Chusaurus were described in 2023 by a team of paleontologists from the China University of Geosciences and the Hubei Geological Museum. They were collected from the Jialingjiang Formation, a sedimentary rock unit that preserves a rich diversity of marine reptiles from the Early Triassic. The genus name, Chusaurus", honors Chu Zhonglin, a Chinese paleontologist who contributed to the study of Triassic marine reptiles. The species name, "xiangensis", refers to the Xiang River, which flows through Hubei Province.

== Description ==
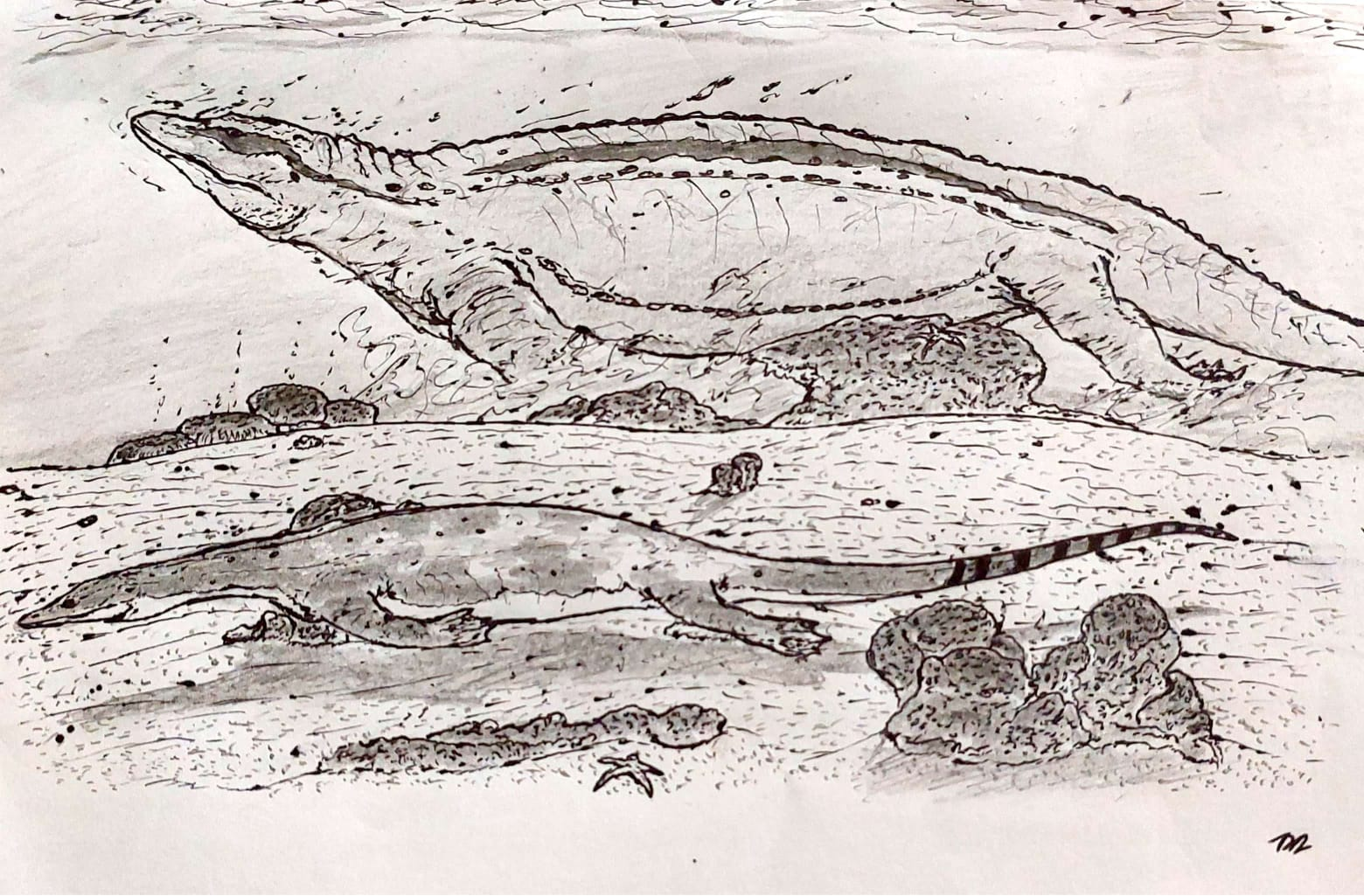
Chusaurus xiangensis (foreground)

Chusaurus is a small-sized sauropterygian, with an estimated total length of about 60 cm. It has a slender body, a short neck, and four paddle-like limbs. The skull is poorly preserved, but it shows some features that distinguish it from other pachypleurosaurids, such as a large external naris, a reduced premaxilla, and a long maxilla. The teeth are conical and slightly curved, indicating a carnivorous diet.

The most distinctive feature of Chusaurus is its short neck, which comprises only 17 cervical vertebrae. This is much less than other pachypleurosaurids, which have 24 to 28 cervical vertebrae, and less than the distantly related plesiosaurs, which have 28 to 76 cervical vertebrae. The cervical vertebrae of Chusaurus are also relatively short and wide, with well-developed neural spines and ribs. The dorsal vertebrae are similar to those of other pachypleurosaurids, but they have more pronounced transverse processes. The caudal vertebrae are not well preserved, but they seem to be elongated and slender.

The limbs of Chusaurus are adapted for swimming, with long and narrow bones and digits. The humerus and femur are similar in shape and size, but the humerus has a larger head and a more prominent deltopectoral crest. The radius and ulna are shorter than the humerus, and the tibia and fibula are shorter than the femur. The manus and pes have five digits each, with the fifth digit being the longest. The phalanges are flattened and expanded distally, forming paddle-like structures.
