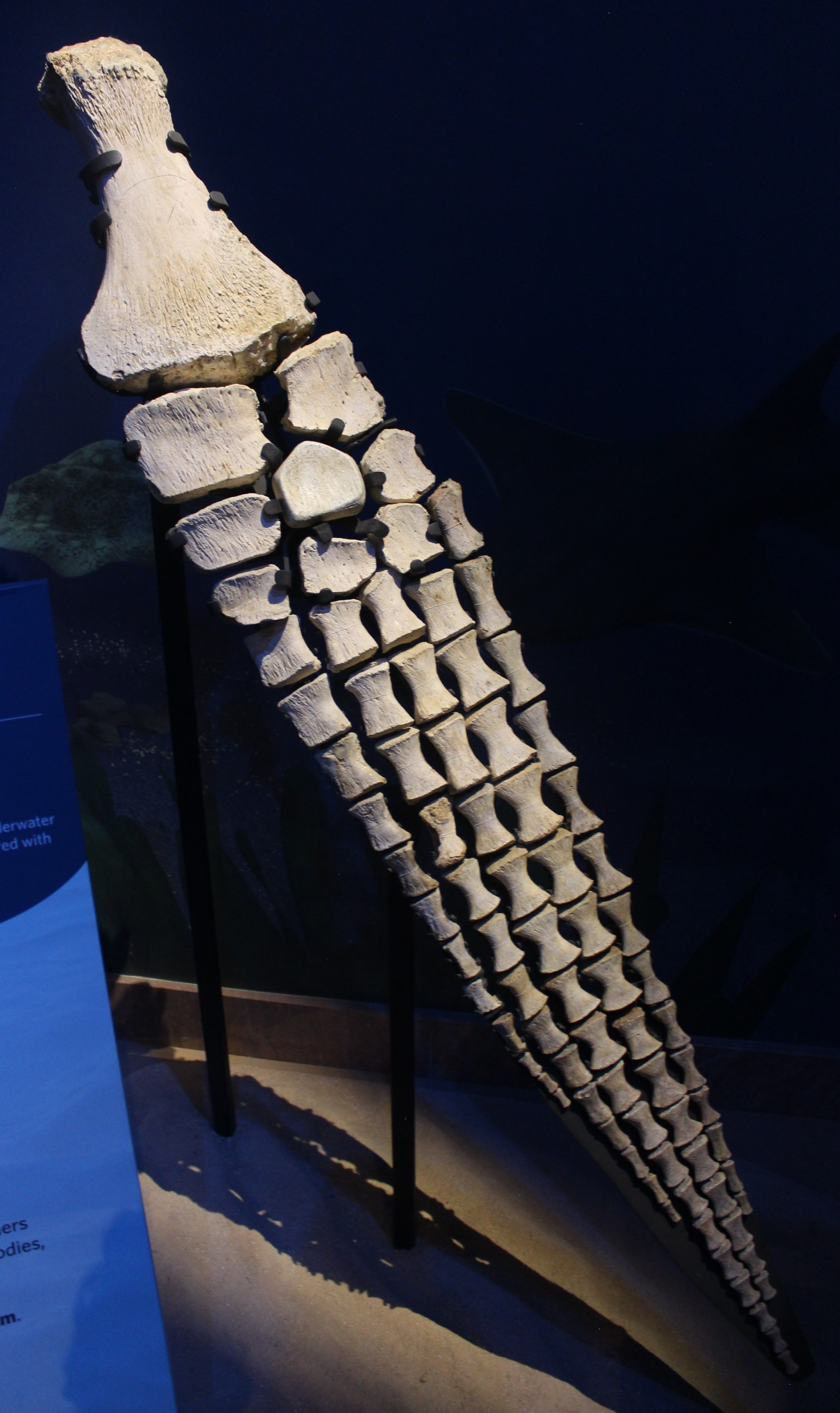
- Hind Flipper

Scientific classification
- Kingdom: Animalia
- Phylum: Chordata
- Class: Reptilia
- Superorder: †Sauropterygia
- Order: †Plesiosauria
- Superfamily: †Plesiosauroidea
- Family: †Elasmosauridae
- Genus: †Cardiocorax; Araújo et al., 2015

Type species
- †Cardiocorax mukulu Araújo et al., 2015

= Cardiocorax =

Cardiocorax Temporal range: Late Cretaceous, 71.40–71.64 Ma

Extinct genus of reptiles

Cardiocorax is an extinct genus of elasmosaurid known from the Late Cretaceous (early Maastrichtian stage) Mocuio Formation of Namibe Province, southern Angola. It contains a single species, Cardiocorax mukulu.

== Discovery ==
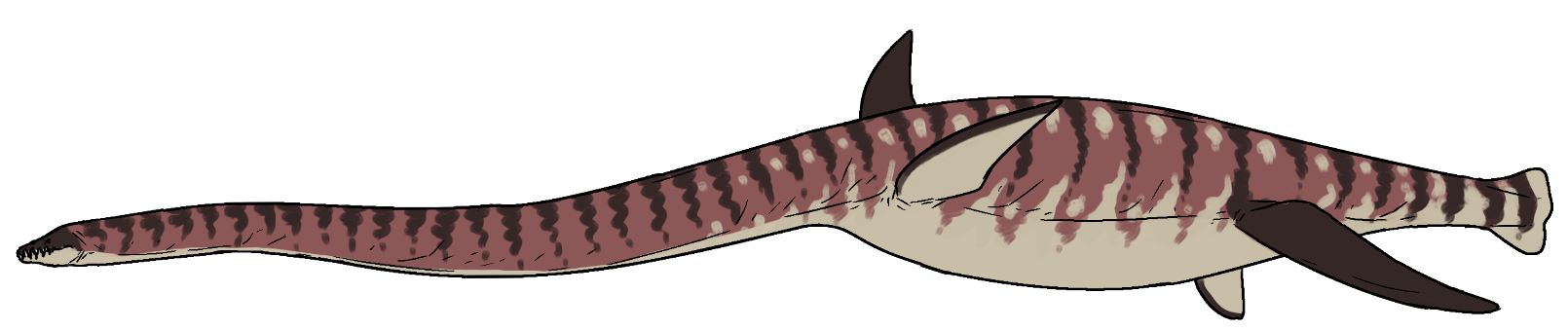
Life restoration

Cardiocorax is known from the holotype MGUAN PA103 which consists of a complete pectoral and pelvic girdle, five neck and one back vertebrae, a partial forelimb including the humerus, radius bone, ulna and isolated phalanges, and several dorsal ribs. A second specimen was also referred to the species, MGAUN PA270, a more complete articulated pelvic girdle and a single hind limb. Both specimens are housed at the Museu de Geologia da Universidade Agostinho Neto in Luanda. The specimens were discovered at Bench 19 locality, about seven meters from each other, in Bentiaba of the Namibe Province. They were collected from the Mocuio Formation of the Sāo Nicolau Group of Namibe Basin, dating to the early Maastrichtian stage of the Late Cretaceous, 71.40–71.64 million years ago. In 2017 Octávio Mateus found a complete skull and partial postcrania also attributed to Cardiocorax.

Cardiocorax was first named by Ricardo Araújo, Michael J. Polcyn, Anne S. Schulp, Octávio Mateus, Louis L. Jacobs, A. Olímpio Gonçalves and M.-L. Morais in 2015 and the type species is Cardiocorax mukulu. The generic name is derived from Latinised Greek Kardia, meaning "heart", plus corax, meaning "raven/crow" which is also the source of the name "coracoid", in reference to the heart-shaped fenestra between the coracoids which is unique to this genus. The specific name comes from the word mukulu in Angolan Bantu dialects, which means "ancestor".

== Classification ==
Cardiocorax is a relatively distinctive elasmosaurid, possessing four unique traits, i.e. autapomorphies. Notably, it shows a reduced dorsal blade of the scapula, a feature unique among elasmosaurids, but convergent with the related cryptoclidid plesiosaurs. This trait indicates a longitudinal protraction-retraction limb cycle rowing style with simple pitch rotation at the glenohumeral articulation - a style unique to Cardiocorax. Araújo et al. (2015) tested the phylogenetic position of the genus using a modified version of Ketchum & Benson (2010) data-set, as well as a second data-set from Vincent et al. (2011) which was found to be consistent with the former. The cladogram below follows their results.

- Elasmosauridae
  - Thalassomedon haningtoni
  - - Terminonatator ponteixensis
    - - Callawayasaurus colombiensis
      - Eromangasaurus australis
    - - - Cardiocorax mukulu
        - Styxosaurus snowii
      - - Hydrotherosaurus alexandrae
        - - Elasmosaurus platyurus
          - Libonectes morgani
