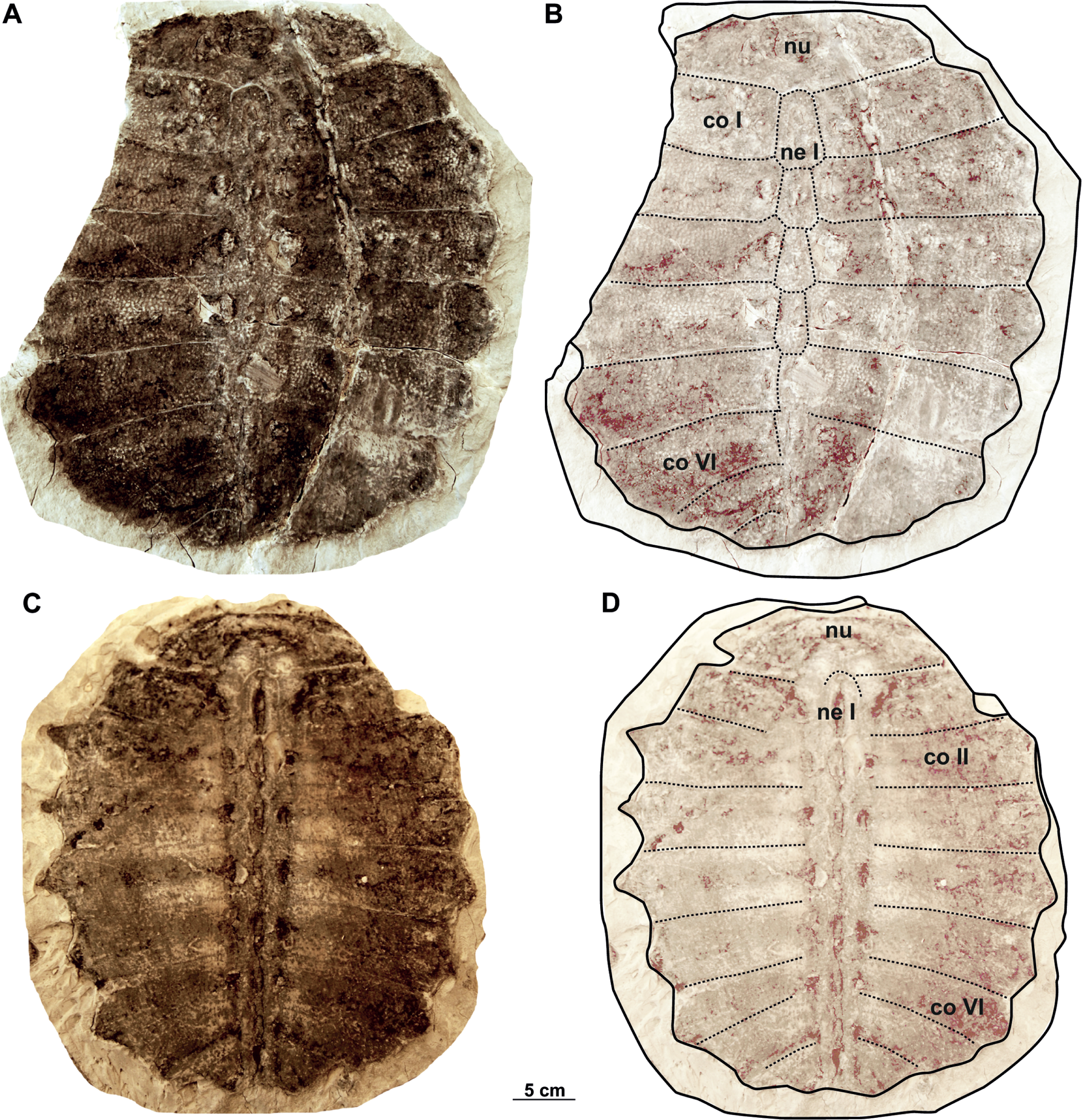
- Carapace

Scientific classification
- Kingdom: Animalia
- Phylum: Chordata
- Class: Reptilia
- Order: Testudines
- Suborder: Cryptodira
- Family: Trionychidae
- Genus: Rafetus
- Species: †R. bohemicus

Binomial name
- †Rafetus bohemicus (Liebus, 1930)

= Rafetus bohemicus =

Rafetus bohemicus Temporal range: Burdigalian

Species of turtle

Rafetus bohemicus is an extinct species of softshell turtle from the Early Miocene (Burdigalian) of the Czech Republic. Specimens have been found at the northeastern margin of the Most Basin at a fossil site called Břešt'any. Fossil carapaces of "R. pontanus", a potential taxonomic synonym (although currently considered a nomen dubium), have been found in slightly younger rocks in Lom and Louka u Litvínova.

== Geology ==
The composition of the Břešt'any Clay is primarily limnic ceramic clay, with the occasional siderite concretion. It has been dated to ~17.5 Ma. It is located between the layers of rock that make up the Holešice and Libkovice Formations.

This fine, kaolinite rich mudstone preserves fossils from an Early Miocene (Burdigalian) lacustrine environment, during a period of global warming known as the Mid-Miocene Climatic Optimum. Here, fossils of Rafetus bohemicus are preserved in either limnic clays or siderite concretions; those of the former are very fragile, making it impossible to extract such specimens from the surrounding matrix. However, three skulls embedded in limnic clay have been CT-scanned.

Skulls
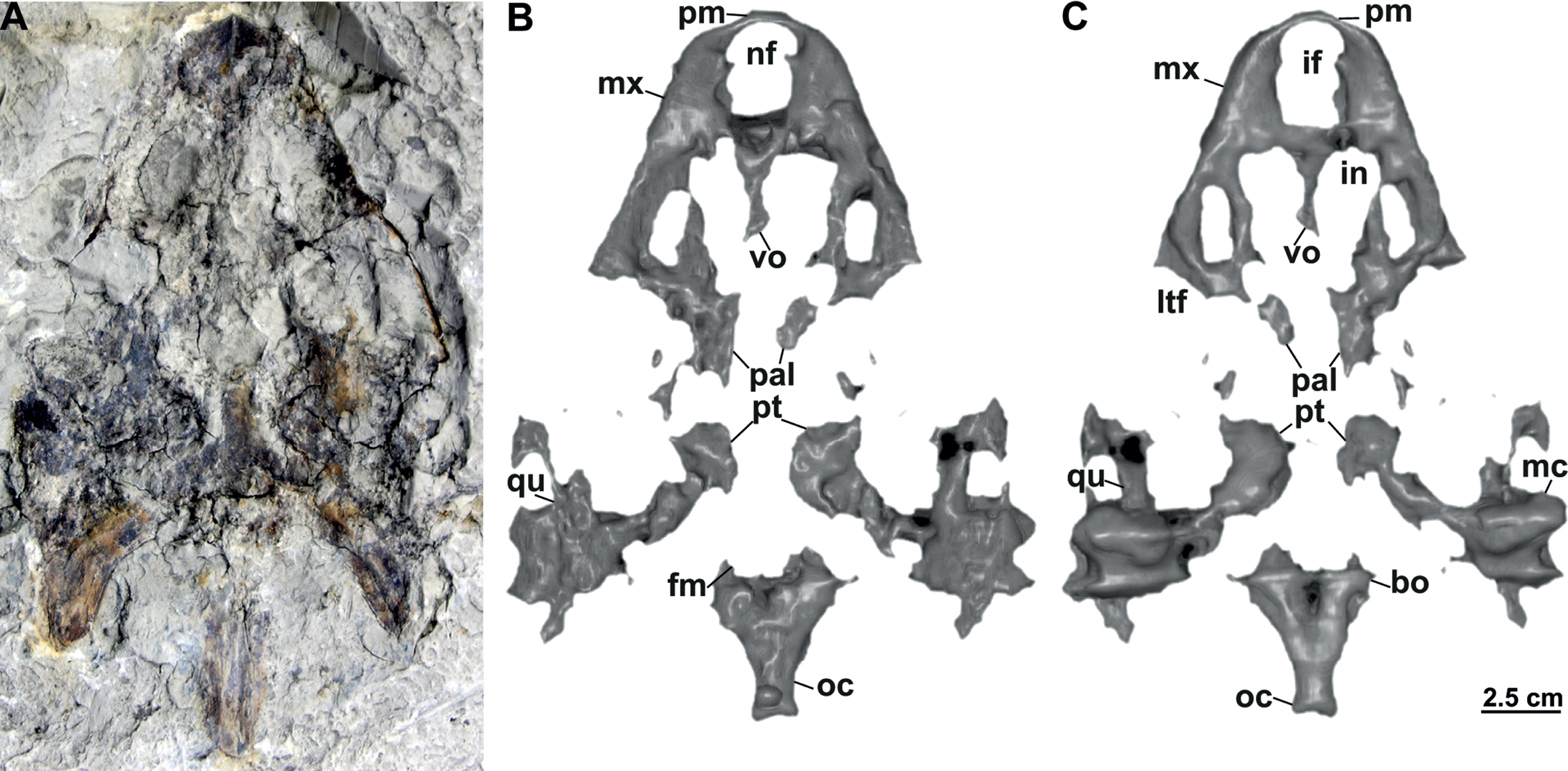
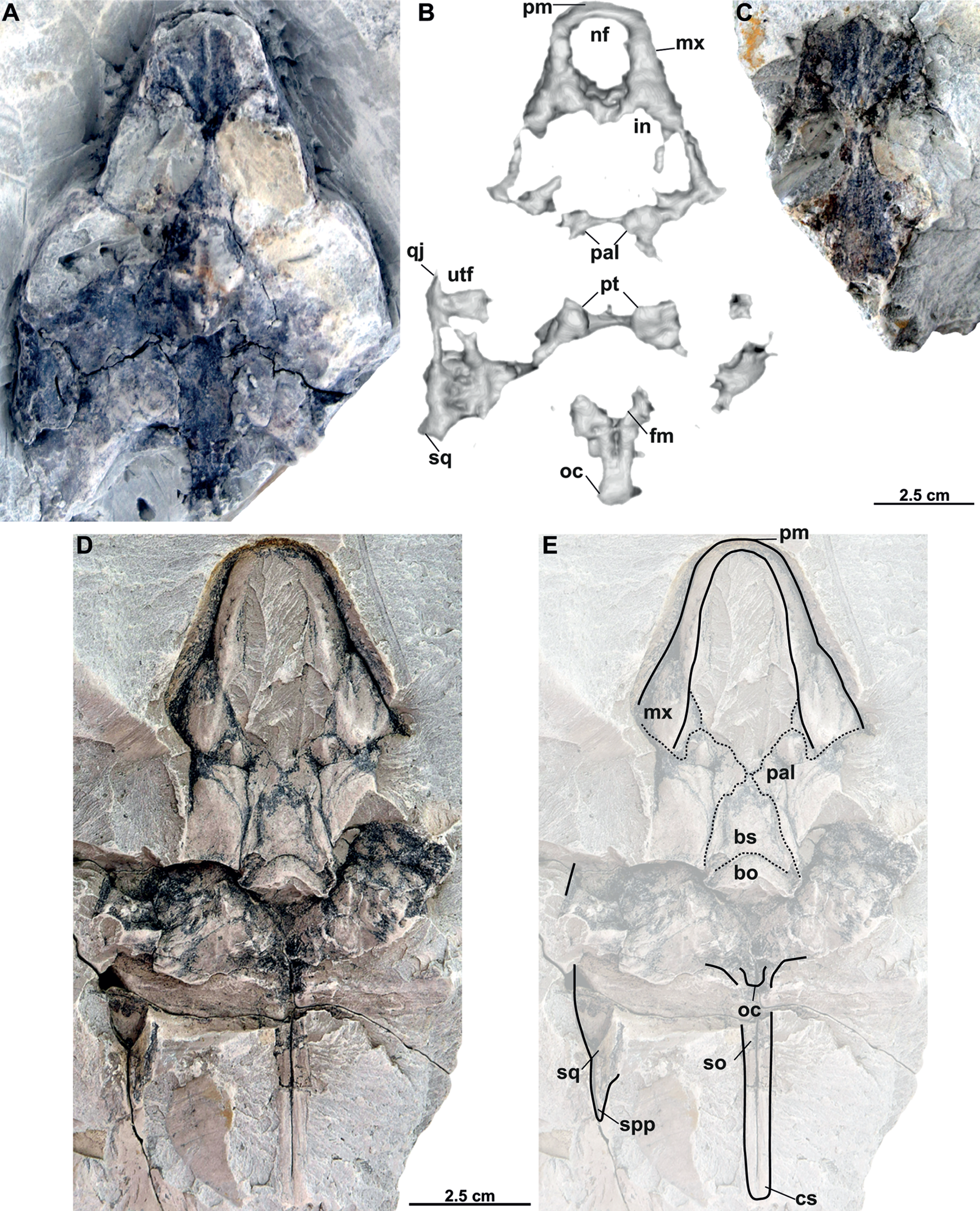
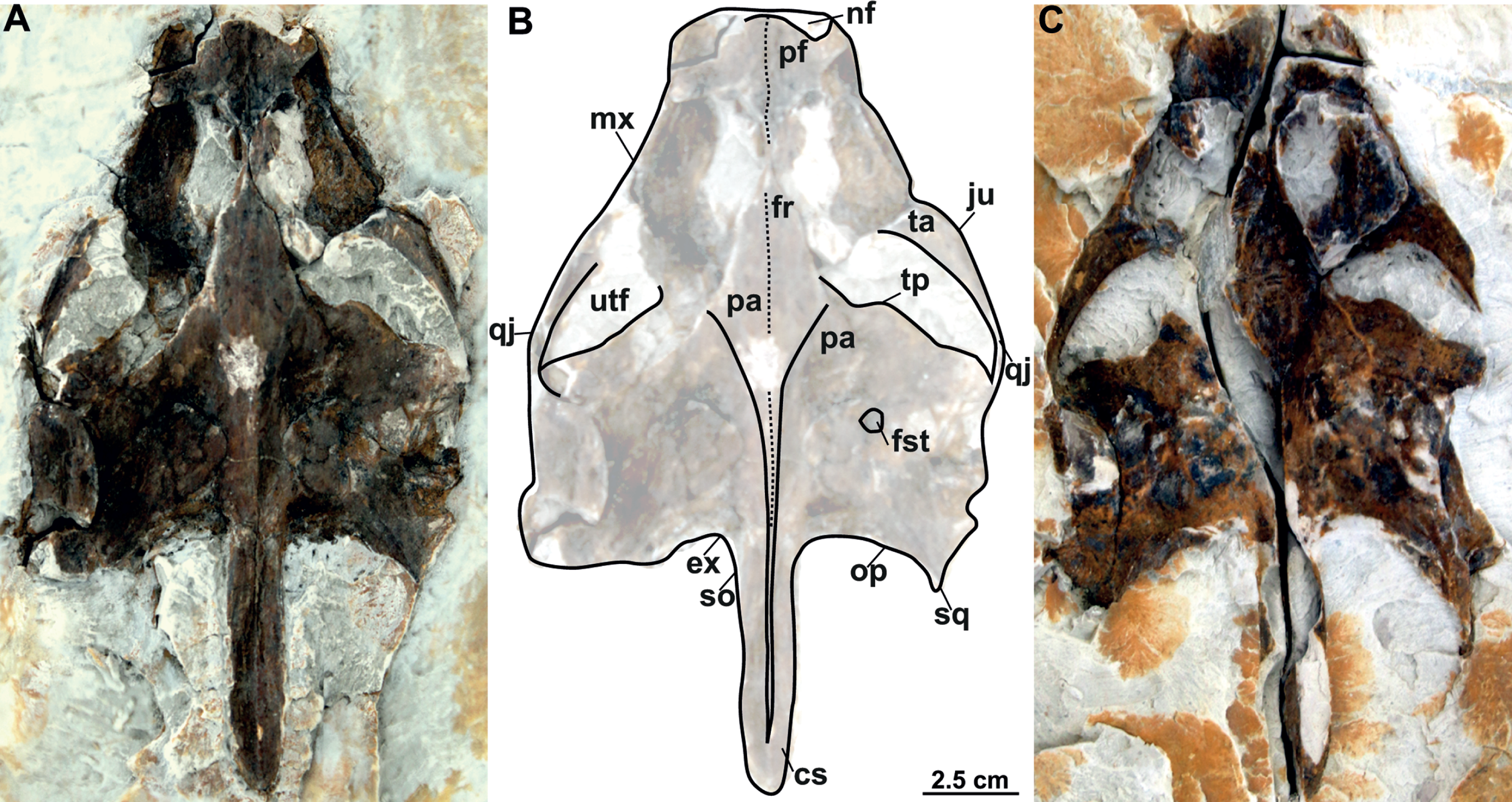
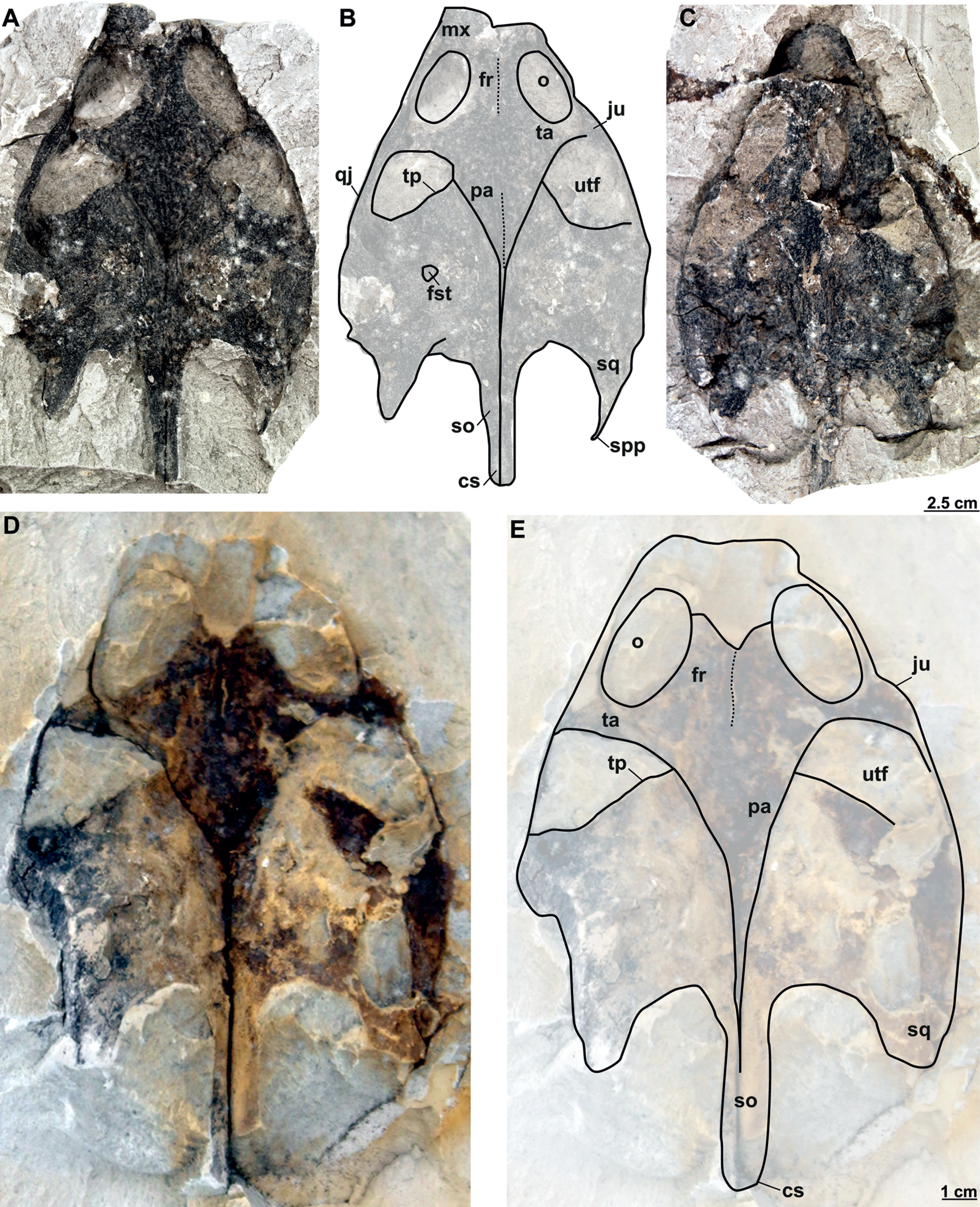

== Taxonomy ==
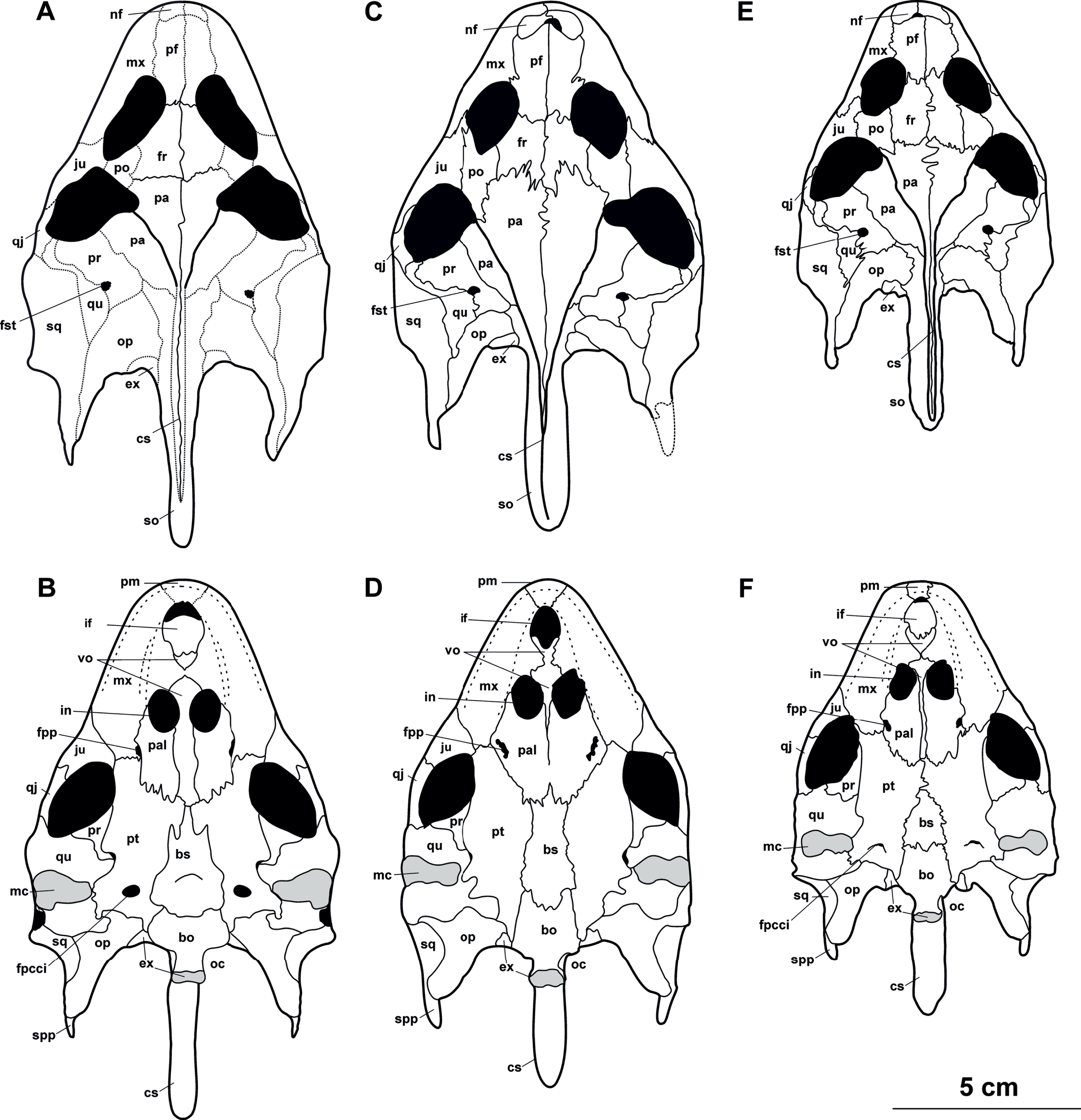
R. bohemicus (A-B), R. swinhoei (C-D), R. euphraticus (E-F)

The species was originally described as Trionyx bohemicus by Adalbert Liebus in 1930.

In 1998, Hans-Volker Karl synonymized T. bohemicus, as well as all other European fossil species then classified under Trionyx, with the extant Trionyx triunguis. In 1999, V. M. Chkhikvadze concluded that all of these species were actually synonyms of Trionyx pontanus as it had nomenclatural priority, which he further revised as Rafetus pontanus. In 2017, Georgios L. Georgalis and Walter G. Joyce concluded that T. pontanus was a nomen dubium; both syntypes were composed only of carapace material, making distinction from T. bohemicus difficult. However, they agreed with T. bohemicus's placement under the genus Rafetus.

In 2023, Chroust et al. reaffirmed T. pontanus's affinity with the genus Rafetus, but agreed it should remain a nomen dubium, and furthermore provided a redescription of Rafetus bohemicus.

Carapaces
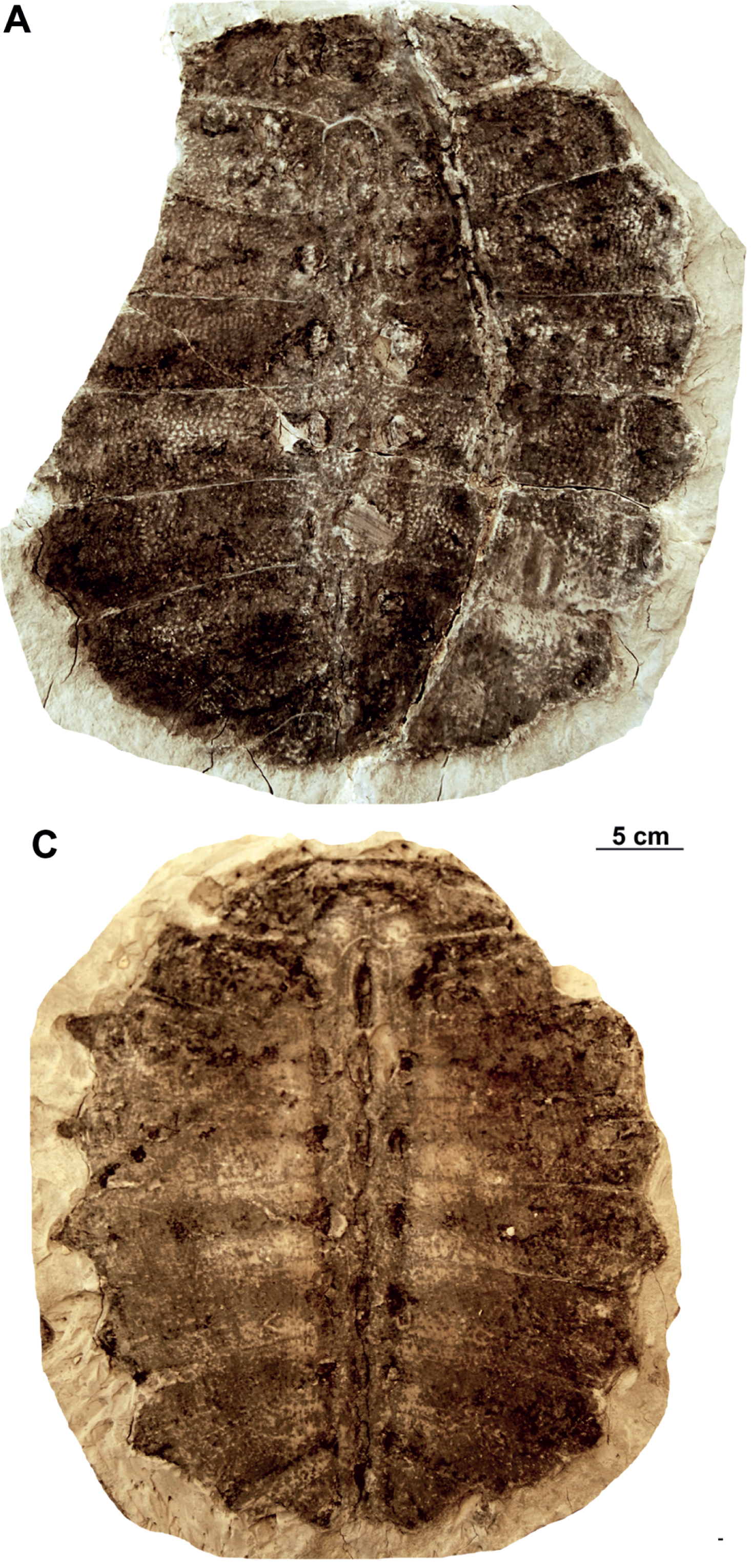
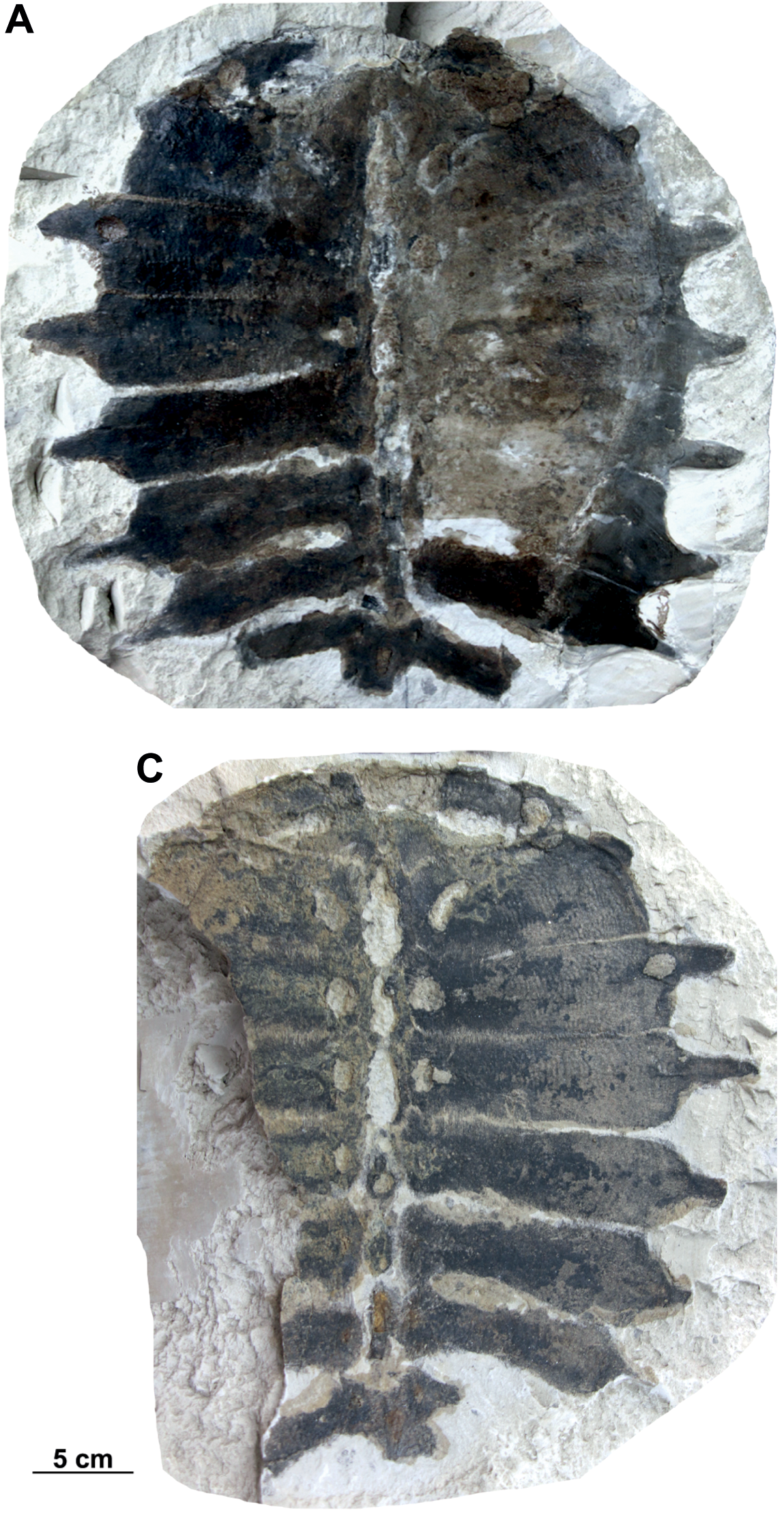
Originals (top) and imprints (bottom)

== Description ==
As a species of Rafetus, R. bohemicus can be distinguished from other European fossil softshell turtle species of the genus Trionyx by its shorter and broader snout, a larger internal naris, a non-concave medial edge of the maxilla in palatal view (instead of straight), and a shorter intermaxillary suture developed between the intermaxillary foramen and internal naris.

Rafetus bohemicus is smaller than its living congener, the Yangtze giant softshell (Rafetus swinhoei). Of the known skull material, the largest skull is that of RMT PA 1310, measuring 19.2 cm from the anterior rim of the orbit to the posterior end of the supraoccipital crest. Larger specimens show a more developed supraoccipital crest and squamosal posterior process. Two carapaces are known, which are similar in size (around 30 cm long) and belonged to subadult individuals.

== Evolution ==
Phylogenetic analyses in 2014 have estimated that the two living Rafetus species (R. swinhoei and R. euphraticus) diverged 20 million years ago, in the Early Miocene. R. bohemicus is just slightly younger than this time of divergence, at 17.5 million years old, coinciding with a period of global warming known as the Mid-Miocene Climatic Optimum.

== Gallery ==
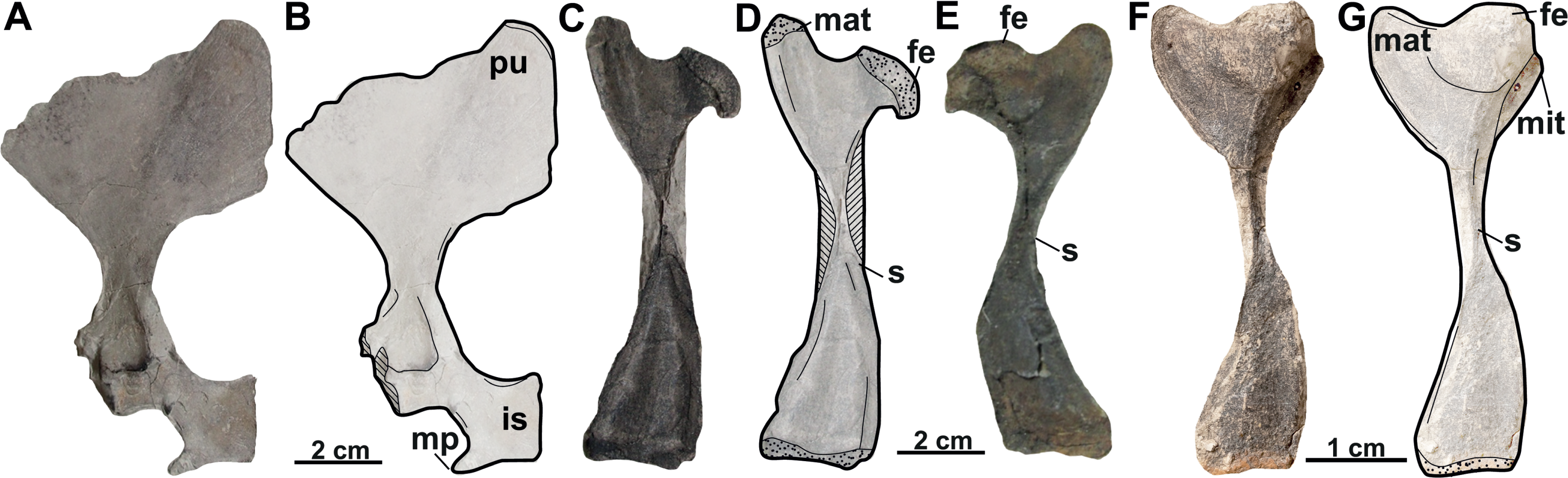
Left pubis and ischium (A-B). Right femur (C–D). Left femur (E). Right femur (F–G).

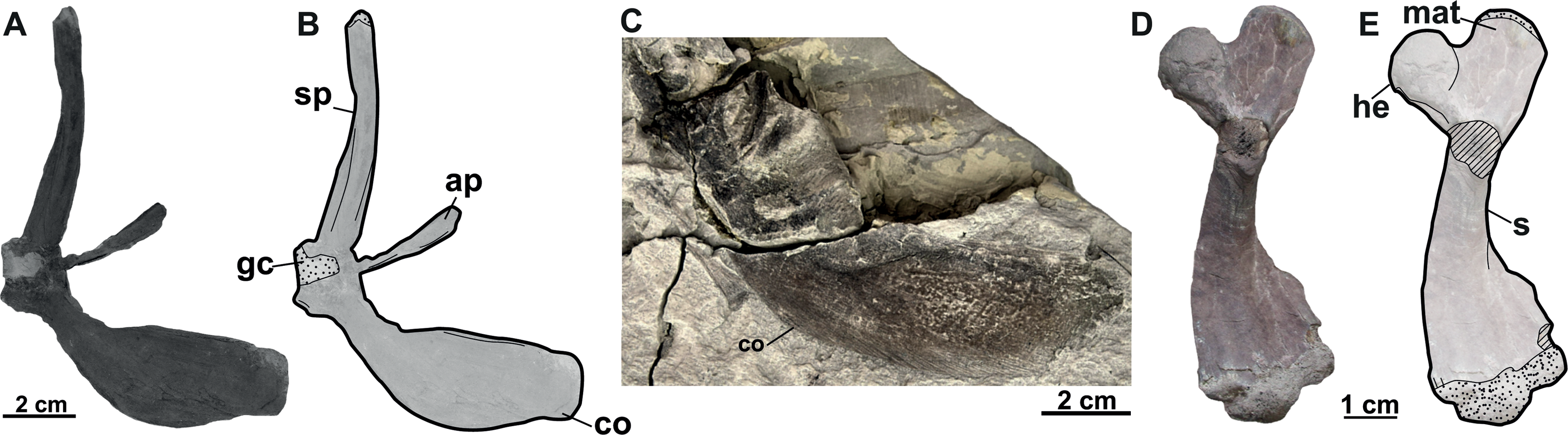
Right pectoral girdle (A-B), right coracoid(C) view, right humerus (D–E) view.

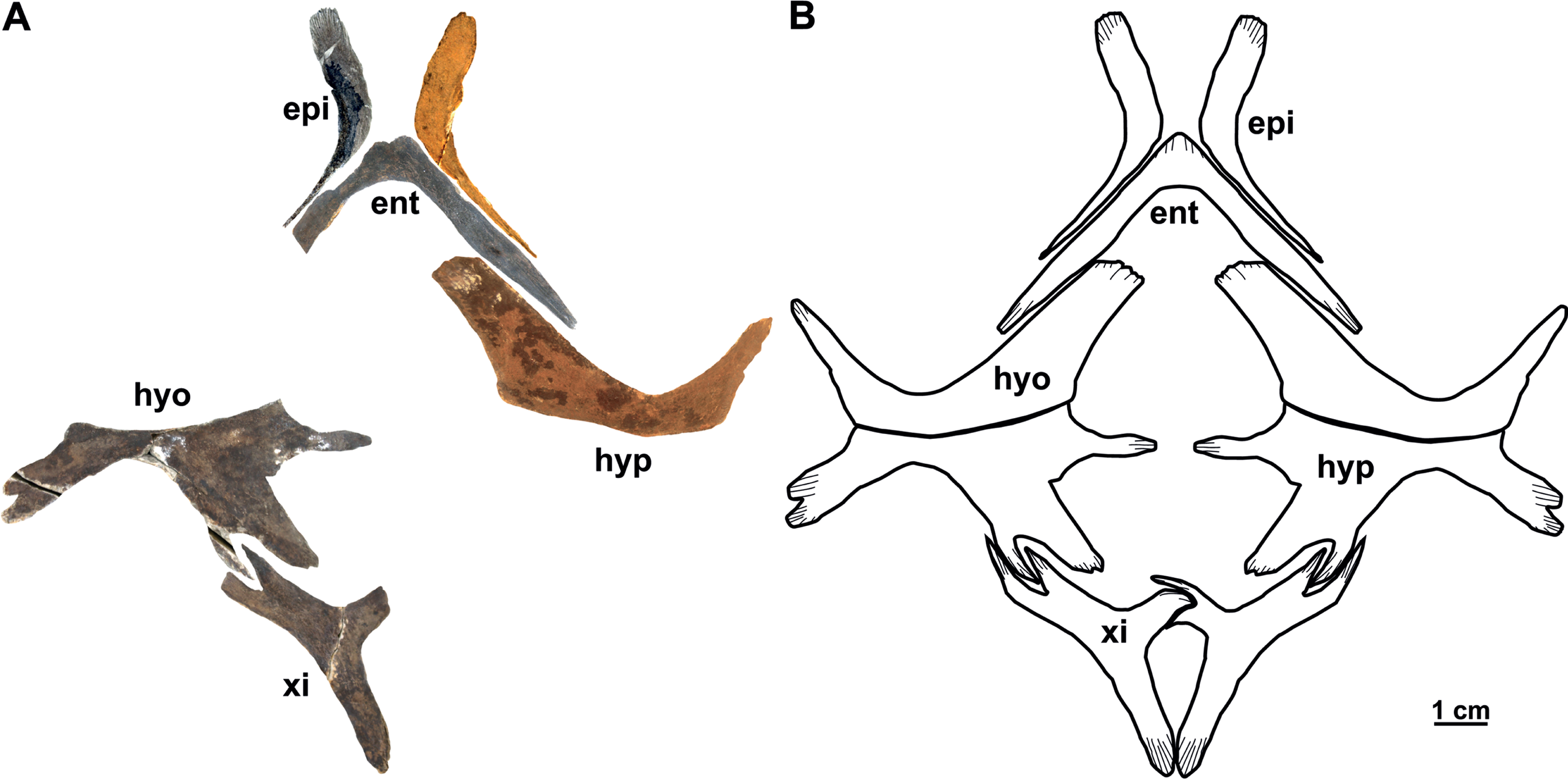
Plastron elements in ventral view (A), reconstruction of the plastron in ventral view (B)

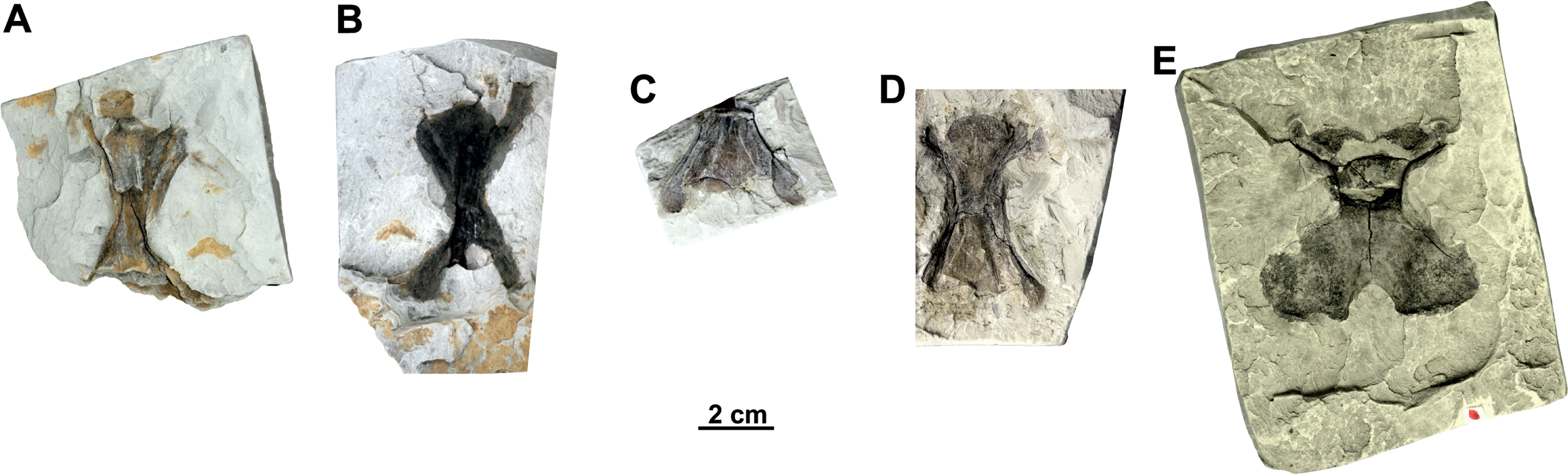
Isolated cervical vertebrae
