= Senectosaurus =

Senectosaurus Temporal range: Late Permian (Vyatkian Substage)

Scientific classification
- Kingdom: Animalia
- Phylum: Chordata
- Class: Reptilia
- Subclass: †Parareptilia
- Order: †Procolophonomorpha
- Clade: †Pareiasauria
- Family: †Pareiasauridae
- Genus: †Senectosaurus
- Species: †S. karamzini

Binomial name
- †Senectosaurus karamzini Boyarinova & Golubev 2023

Genus of extinct pareiasaur reptiles

Senectosaurus (meaning "old lizard") is an extinct genus of pareiasaur from the late Permian Kutuluk Formation of Russia. The genus contains a single species, S. karamzini, known from a partial postcranial skeleton including osteoderms.

== Discovery and naming ==
The Senectosaurus holotype specimen, PIN no. 5864/1, was discovered in 2008 in sediments of the Kutuluk Formation (Chroniosaurus levis Zone) near Preobrazhenka in the Buzuluksky District of Orenburg Oblast, Russia. The specimen consists of several postcranial associated but disarticulated bones, including 11 osteoderms, a partial right pelvis, the left ilium, a fragmentary right scapula, both ulnae, a tibia and fibula, the left femur, a tarsal, several ribs, and some dorsal vertebrae. An additional specimen, PIN, no. 2895/13, was assigned as a paratype, consisting of an osteoderm from a different locality.

In 2023, Boyarinova & Golubev described Senectosaurus karamzini as a new genus and species of pareiasaur based on these fossil remains. The generic name, "Senectosaurus", is derived from the Latin "senectus", meaning "old", and the Greek "sauros", meaning "lizard". The specific name, "karamzini", honors Nikolai Mikhailovich Karamzin, a Russian historian and writer, as the holotype was discovered near his family estate.

== Description ==
Boyarinova & Golubev (2023) described Senectosaurus as a large pareiasaur. The presence of clear ridges and tubercles on the femur and tarsal suggest that the holotype individual was aged when it died. The preserved osteoderms range in size from 3–7 centimetres (1.2–2.8 in) long. Its body had a sparse cover of platform-like osteoderms, with a continuous shield of osteoderms over the neck region.
