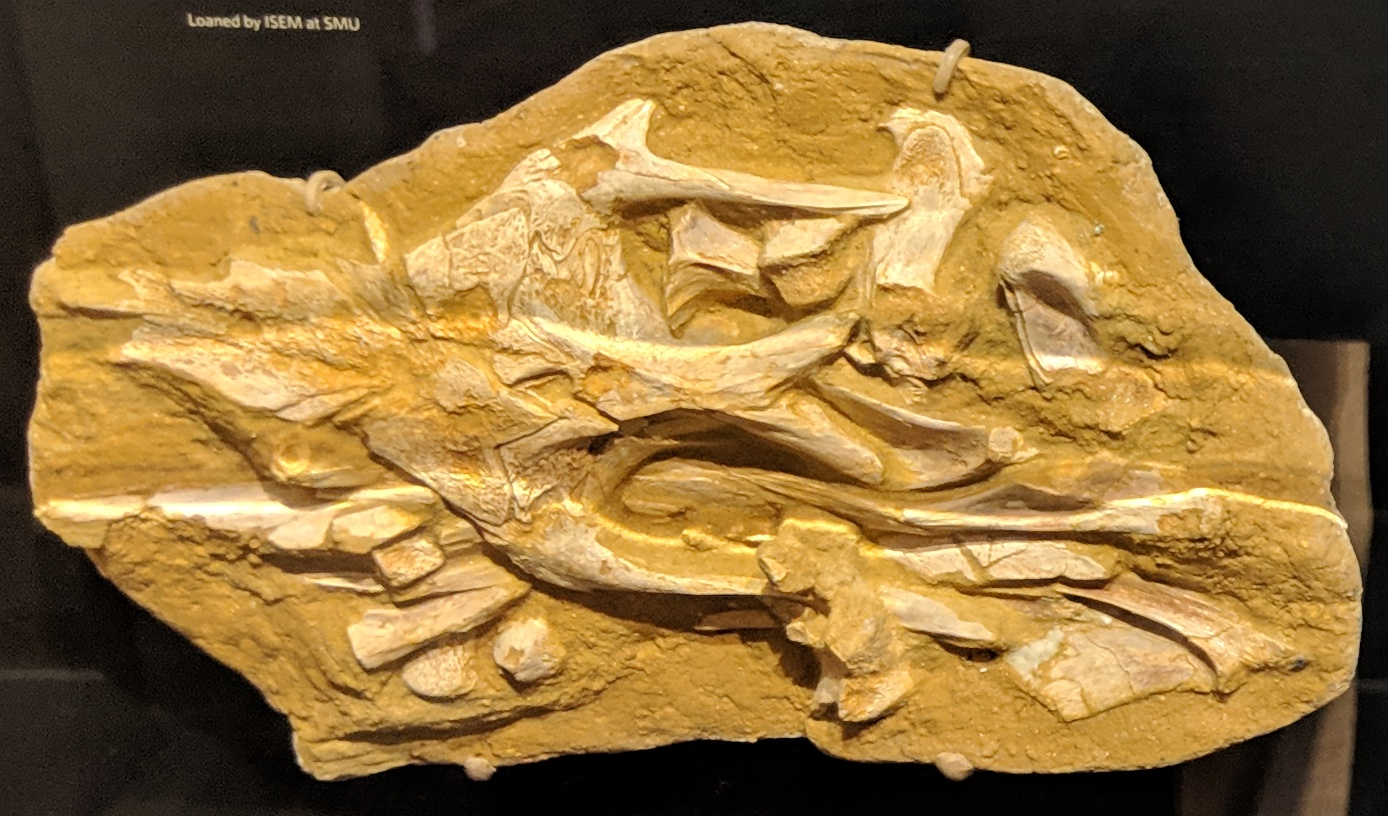
- Main skull block of syntype (MGUAN PA 183D) on temporary display at the Smithsonian Museum

Scientific classification
- Kingdom: Animalia
- Phylum: Chordata
- Class: Reptilia
- Order: Squamata
- Clade: †Mosasauria
- Family: †Mosasauridae
- Tribe: †Mosasaurini
- Genus: †Bentiabasaurus; Polcyn, Schulp & Gonçalves, 2023

Type species
- †Bentiabasaurus jacobsi Polcyn, Schulp & Gonçalves, 2023

= Bentiabasaurus =

Bentiabasaurus Temporal range: Maastrichtian, 71.40–71.64 Ma

Extinct genus of mosasaurs

Bentiabasaurus was a gracile mosasaurine mosasaur from the Late Cretaceous Mocuio Formation of Angola. The type and only species of the genus, B. jacobsi, was described in 2023 by Michael Polcyn, Anne Schulp and António Gonçalves.

== Specimens ==
The most complete specimen of the animal is a partial skeleton (MGUAN PA 183D), including parts of the skull and mandibles, alongside a number of vertebrae and ribs.

This specimen is estimated to have been 3-3.7 metres long in life, and was found as part of the gut contents of a 6.5-7 metre Prognathodon kianda, alongside a 4 metre Gavialimimus sp. and a 4.6 metre cannibalized subadult Prognathodon kianda which were also eaten. Being positioned more anteriorly in the gut than the other two larger mosasaurs, and exhibiting much less erosion from stomach acids, it was likely the predator's last meal. All three of the ingested mosasaurs were largely composed of the skull and front portion of the body.

This specimen was one of the two designated syntypes recovered from the Bench 19 Bonebed near Bentiaba, Angola. The other syntype specimen included partial mandibles and partial quadrates.

Three additional partial right quadrates were also referred to the species.

== Etymology ==
The genus name is a combination of the name Bentiaba, the place near which it was found, and the Ancient Greek σαῦρος (saûros, "lizard"). The specific name, jacobsi, refers to Professor Louis L. Jacobs, in honor of his contributions to African vertebrate paleontology.
