= Mocuio Formation =

Late Cretaceous sedimentary rock formation found in Angola

- Stratigraphic range: Late Campanian–Early Maastrichtian
- Type: Geological formation
- Overlies: Baba Formation

Lithology
- Primary: Sandstone

Location
- Country: Angola

The Mocuio Formation is a Late Cretaceous sedimentary rock formation found in southern Angola. It extends from the latest Campanian to the Early Maastrichtian. Many vertebrate fossils have been collected from the formation.

== Fossil content ==
Color key: Taxon / Reclassified taxon / Taxon falsely reported as present / Dubious taxon or junior synonym / Ichnotaxon / Ootaxon / Morphotaxon	Notes; Uncertain or tentative taxa are in small text; ~~crossed out~~ taxa are discredited.

=== Pterosaurs ===
Pterosaurs of the Mocuio Formation
Genus	Species	Location	Stratigraphic position	Material	Notes	Image
Epapatelo	E. otyikokolo	Namibe Province, Angola	Maastrichtian	Left humerus & Left ulna.	A aponyctosaurian pteranodontian	

=== Crocodylomorphs ===
Crocodylomorphs of the Mocuio Formation
Genus	Species	Location	Stratigraphic position	Material	Notes	Image
Hyposaurinae Indet.	Indeterminate	Namibe Province, Angola	Maastrichtian		A hyposaurine dyrosaurid	

=== Mosasaurs ===
Mosasaurs of the Mocuio Formation
Genus	Species	Location	Stratigraphic position	Material	Notes	Image
Bentiabasaurus	B. jacobsi	Namibe Province, Angola	Maastrichtian	Partial skeleton.	A mosasaurin mosasaurine	

=== Plesiosaurs ===
Plesiosaurs of the Mocuio Formation
Genus	Species	Location	Stratigraphic position	Material	Notes	Image
Cardiocorax	C. mukulu	Namibe Province, Angola	Maastrichtian	Partial skeleton.	A euelasmosauridan elasmosaurid	

=== Fish ===
==== Cartilaginous Fish ====
Cartilaginous fish of the Mocuio Formation
Genus	Species	Location	Stratigraphic position	Material	Notes	Image
Rolfodon	R. goliath	Namibe Province, Angola	Campanian	Teeth.	A chlamydoselachid hexanchiform	

== See also ==
- Lists of fossiliferous stratigraphic units in Africa
  - List of fossiliferous stratigraphic units in Angola
- Geology of Angola
