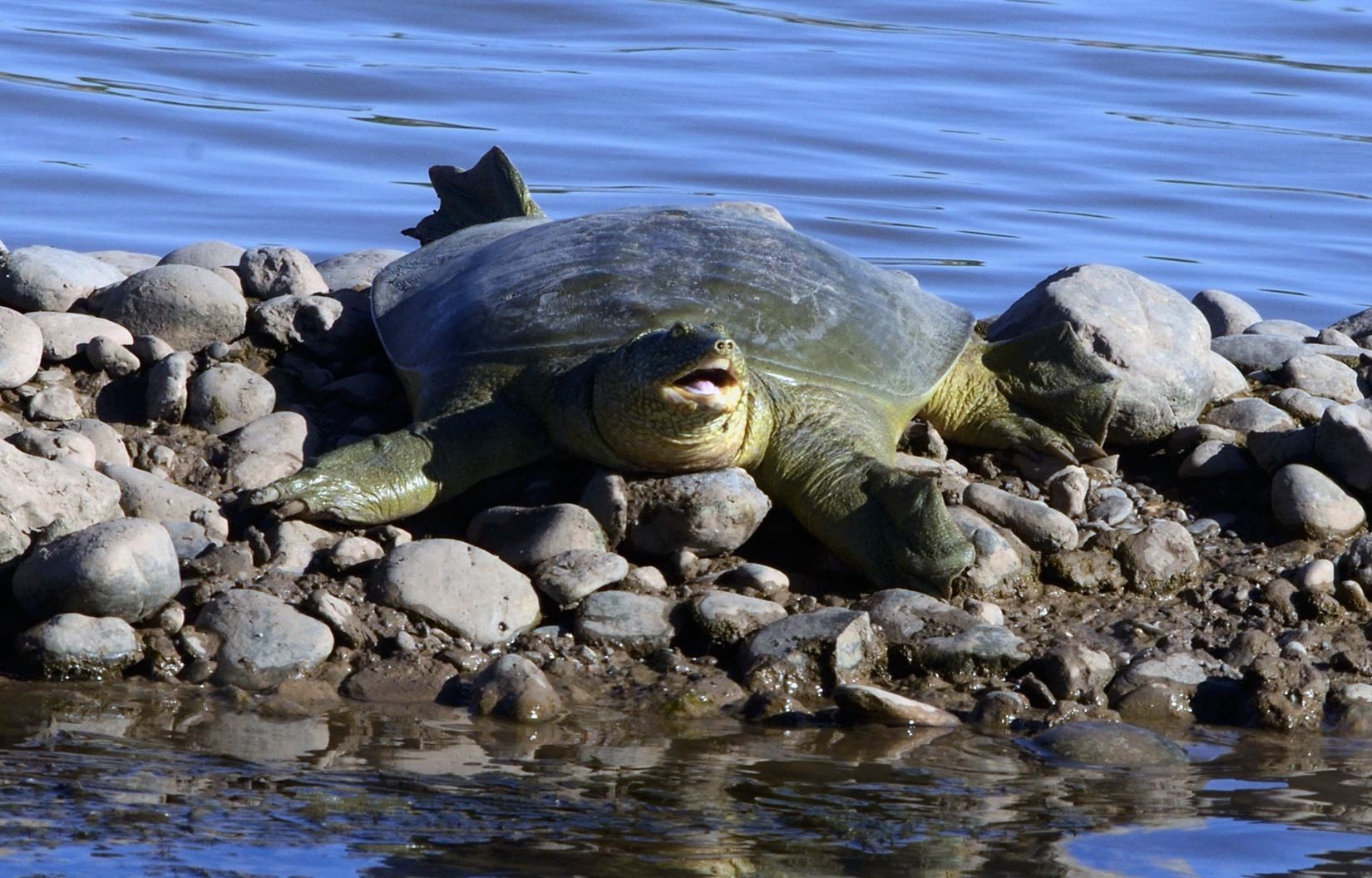

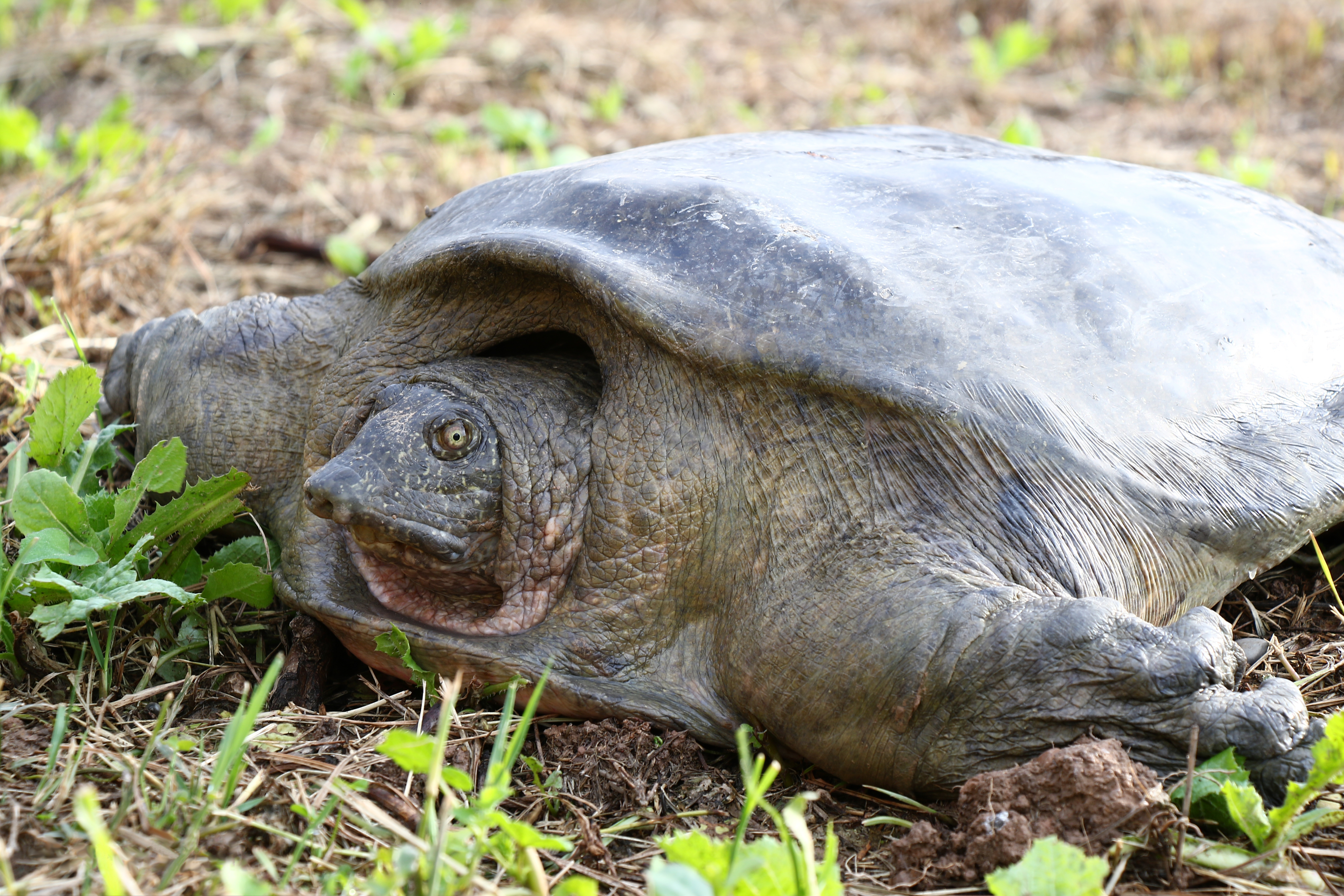

Conservation status
- Endangered (IUCN 3.1)
- CITES Appendix II

Scientific classification
- Kingdom: Animalia
- Phylum: Chordata
- Class: Reptilia
- Order: Testudines
- Suborder: Cryptodira
- Family: Trionychidae
- Genus: Rafetus
- Species: R. euphraticus

Binomial name
- Rafetus euphraticus (Daudin, 1801)

Synonyms
- List: Testudo euphratica Daudin, 1801; Testudo rafcht Olivier, 1807; Trionyx euphraticus Geoffroy Saint-Hilaire, 1809; Testudo rascht Gray, 1831 (ex errore); Gymnopus euphraticus Duméril & Bibron, 1835; Tyrse rafeht Gray, 1844 (ex errore); Trionyx rafeht Gray, 1856; Rafetus euphraticus Gray, 1864; Pelodiscus euphraticus Baur, 1893; Amyda euphratica Hay, 1904; Tyrse euphratica Hay, 1904; Trionix euphracticus Richard, 1999 (ex errore)

= Euphrates softshell turtle =

Species of turtle

In Turkey

The Euphrates softshell turtle (Rafetus euphraticus), also known as the Mesopotamian softshell turtle, is a species of softshell turtle in the family Trionychidae. It is found throughout much of the Euphrates–Tigris river basin in Iraq, Syria, Turkey and Khūzestān Province of Iran. Historically it has also been reported from Israel, but this likely involves confusion with the very similar Trionyx triunguis (the two typically require in-hand examination to be separated).

The Euphrates softshell turtle is an endangered species that primarily is threatened by habitat loss and alteration, especially the building of dams, but to lesser extent also pollution and killing by fishermen.

== History ==
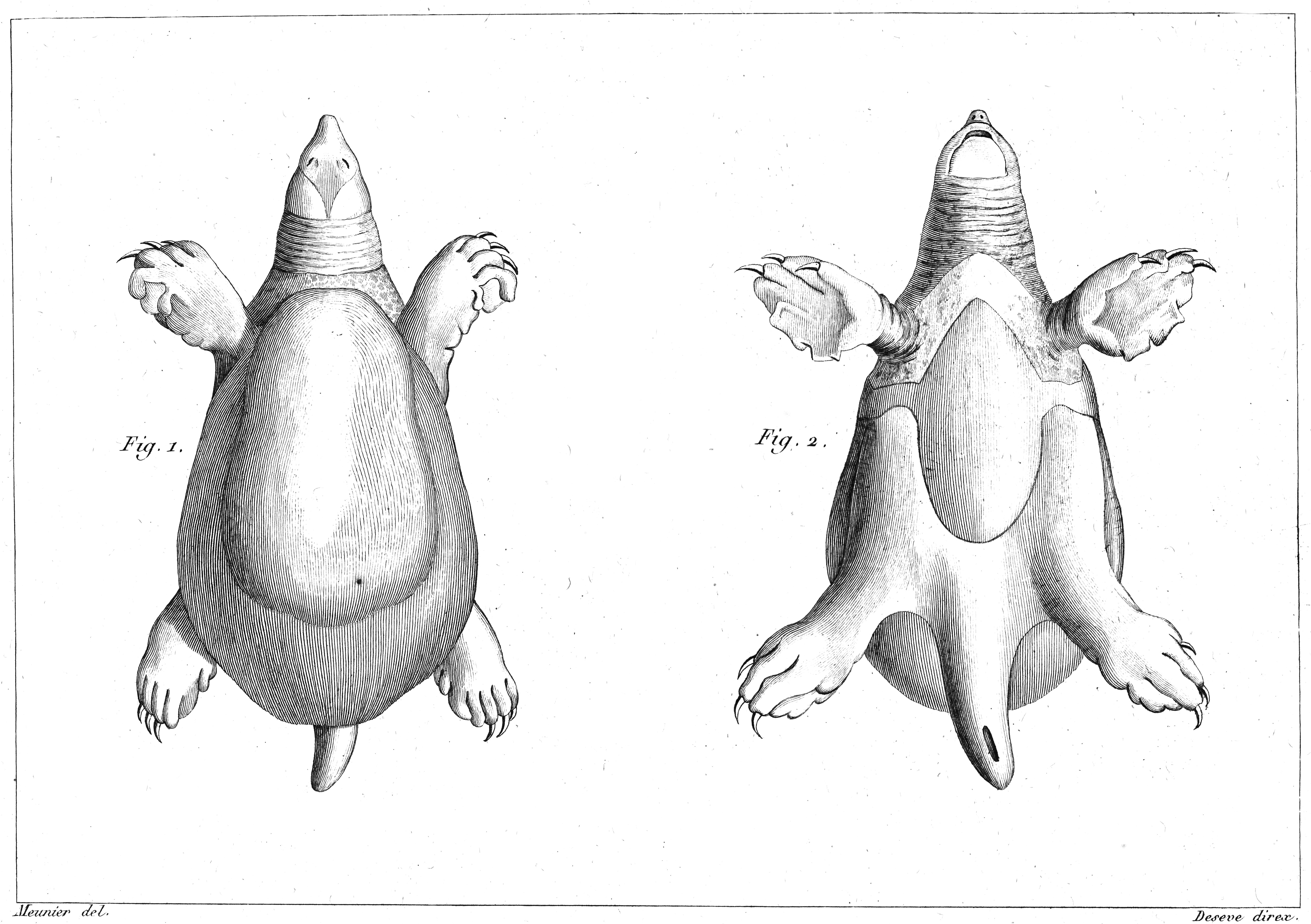
The turtle was originally called Testudo rafcht by Guillaume-Antoine Olivier, who shot a three-foot-long specimen in June 1797 when crossing the Euphrates near Anah

The Euphrates softshell turtle became known to western science when the French naturalist Guillaume-Antoine Olivier shot a specimen while crossing the Euphrates near Anah in June 1797. The local residents told him that the meat of this animal was not good to eat, but its fat was considered an excellent medication for a variety of skin diseases. Olivier named the species Testudo rafcht, because, as he said "the Arabs called it rafcht".

Olivier's book did not explain what the name meant in Arabic; however a number of modern Arabic web pages say that the turtle is known locally as al-rafš (الرفش), which is translated in standard dictionaries as "the spade" or "the shovel", and perhaps refers to the shape of the creature's carapace. Olivier passed the information about the creature to François Marie Daudin, who described it in his Histoire des reptiles (1801).

Later naturalists apparently often misread Olivier's rafcht as rafeht. The name Rafetus euphraticus, and the genus Rafetus itself, were proposed by John Edward Gray in 1864, who mentions in his work that the species had been variously known as Trionyx euphraticus, Testudo euphraticus, Trionyx rafeht, Tyrse rafeht, or Testudo rafeht.

== Description ==
This freshwater turtle can weigh up to 20 kg (44 lb), and it has a smooth leathery shell that can reach up to 68 cm (2.2 ft) in length. The sexes are apparently alike in size and general appearance. The upperparts are typically dull olive in colour, sometimes with an indistinct spotted pattern, especially on the head. There are some minor variations in the colour pattern, and rarely individuals may be dark brown or even black above.

1913 illustrations of ontogeny

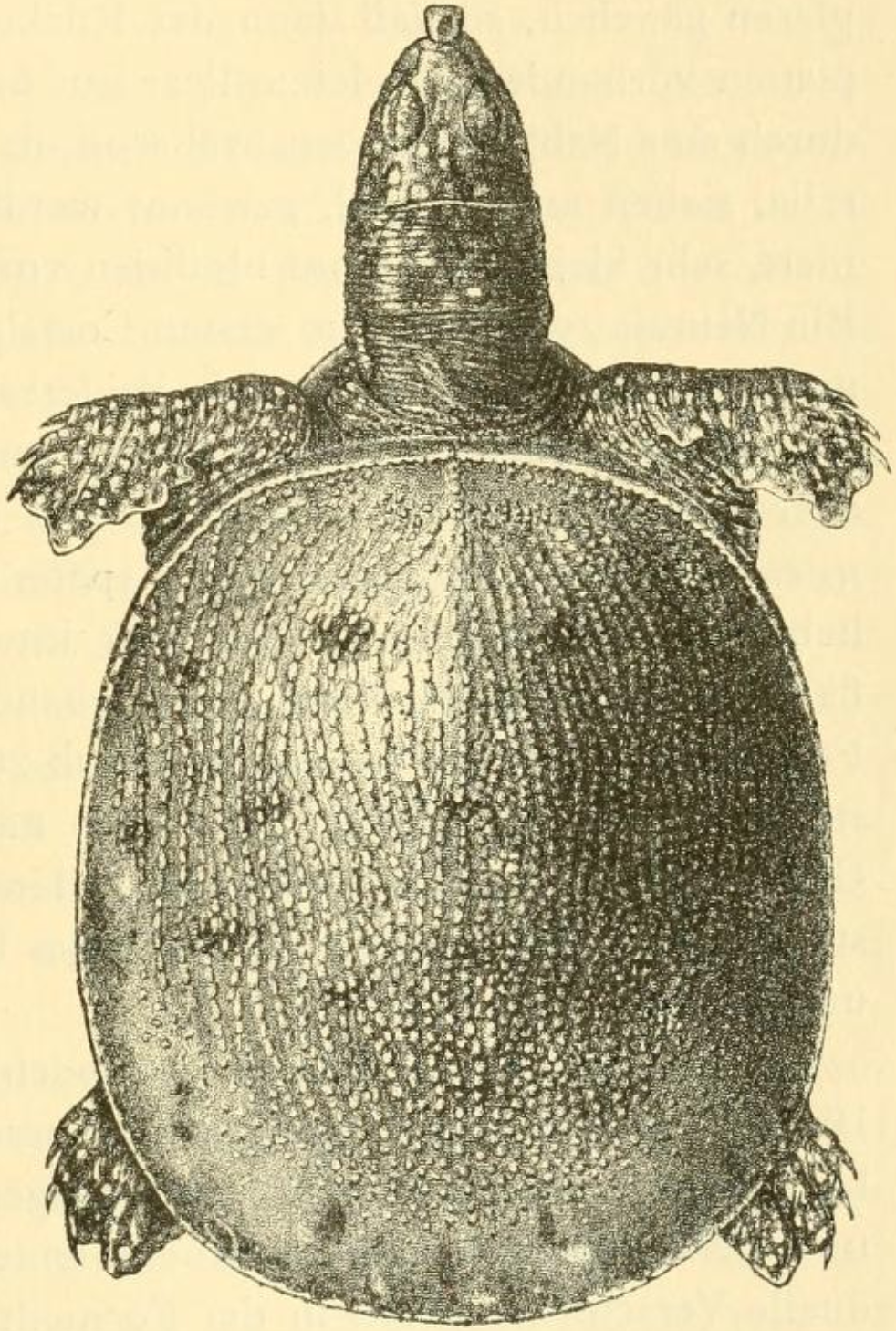
Young juvenile

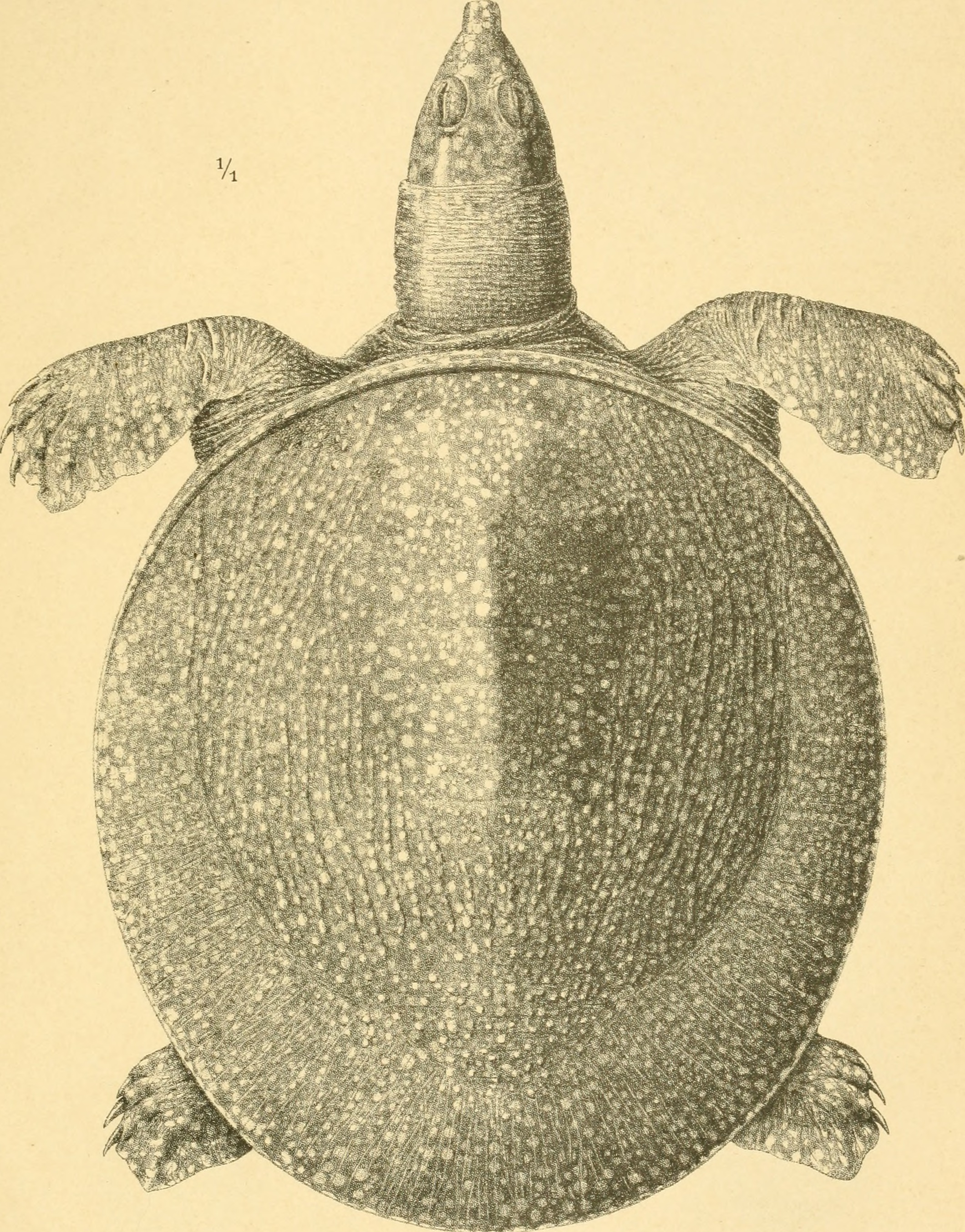
Older juvenile

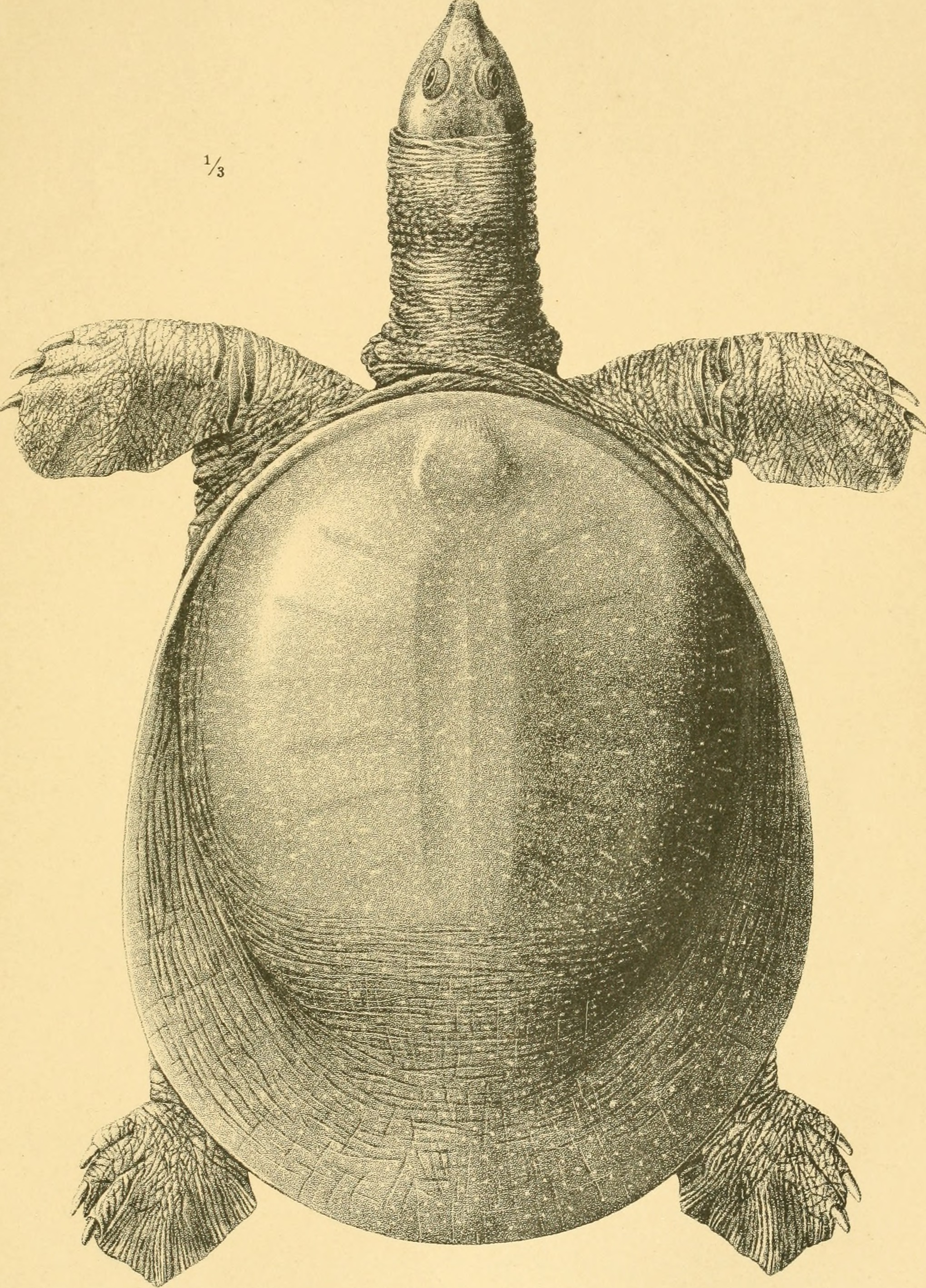
Adult

== Habitat ==
The Euphrates softshell turtle has been found in a wide range of freshwater habitats such as rivers, streams, lakes, ponds, reservoirs and marshlands. It prefers areas with shallow and calm water, sandy banks and many fish (especially cyprinids). Although it mainly resides in shallow calm water, this is often adjacent to deep fast-flowing water. In the fast-flowing Euphrates it generally avoids the main stem, instead occurring in side-branches or backwaters. In parts of the Tigris River with a slower flow, it occurs even in the main stem. They bask on or at the banks of rivers, with some remaining in shallow water to avoid being on land. They sometimes bury themselves into the bottom.

== Behaviour ==
The Euphrates softshell turtle is mainly active during the day, but some night-activity also occurs. In parts of its range it is infrequently seen during the winter, likely due to the lower temperature. When basking on land they are very shy, retreating to water at the slightest hint of danger.

=== Feeding ===
Little is known about its feeding preference, but the species has generally been considered a carnivore. It is sometimes seen feeding on carcasses, is easily attracted by lowering a nylon bag filled with lamb blood into the water and fishermen often complain about it taking fish from their nets. However, it has also been caught on lines baited with watermelon, an individual defecated a partially digested tomato and local farmers claim their crops sometimes are eaten by the species. A fecal analysis of 30 individuals mostly revealed remains of crabs and plants, but also insects, birds, fish, river-bed material and debris, leading to the conclusion that the Euphrates softshell turtle is an opportunistic omnivore.

=== Breeding ===
Nesting in this species is seasonal, but exact timing depends on the region. The nest is dug by the female in a bank of a river and it can be up to 50 cm (1.6 ft) deep. The site can be bare sand or a sand-soil mix with vegetation. In one case a nest was placed about 4.1 m (13 ft) from the water's edge, in a sand bank with an incline of almost 15°. Each nest can contain up to 32 eggs. The eggs are white, and have a diameter of 2.3–3.0 cm (0.9–1.2 in). When hatching the young have a carapace length of 3.9–5.5 cm (1.5–2.2 in). In some regions a female may nest twice in a season. Adults and sub-adults often have claw or bite marks, indicating frequent aggression between individuals.

== Threats ==
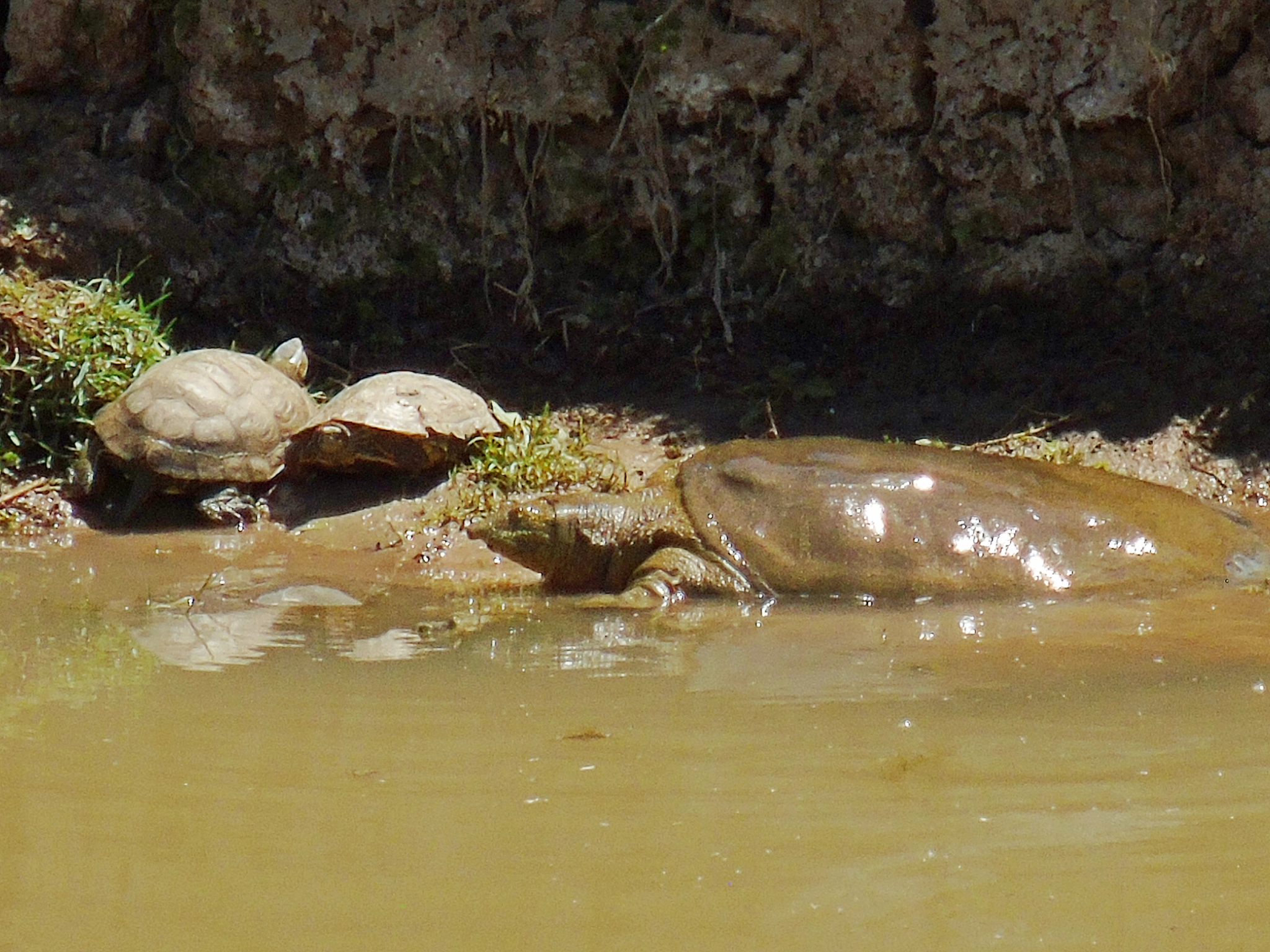
In Turkey, with two Caspian turtles

The Euphrates softshell turtle is an endangered species. Despite this, there are no specific conservation projects aimed at this species in most of its range, except one underway in Iran's Khuzestan Province.

The primary threats are habitat loss and alterations, but to a lesser extent also pollution and killing by fishermen. A major threat is dams, which alter levels of sediment and water temperature, and may flood areas. For example, the population in the Halfeti region disappeared entirely following the construction of the Atatürk Dam, possibly due to colder water, and the Ilısu Dam flooded some known nesting sites of the species. Numerous other dams are planned in the Euphrates-Tigris drainage.

Nevertheless, there are indications that they are able to use nesting sites near human and are not particularly vulnerable to general disturbance. It has been reported from man-made habitats such as reservoirs and artificial canals near cities.
