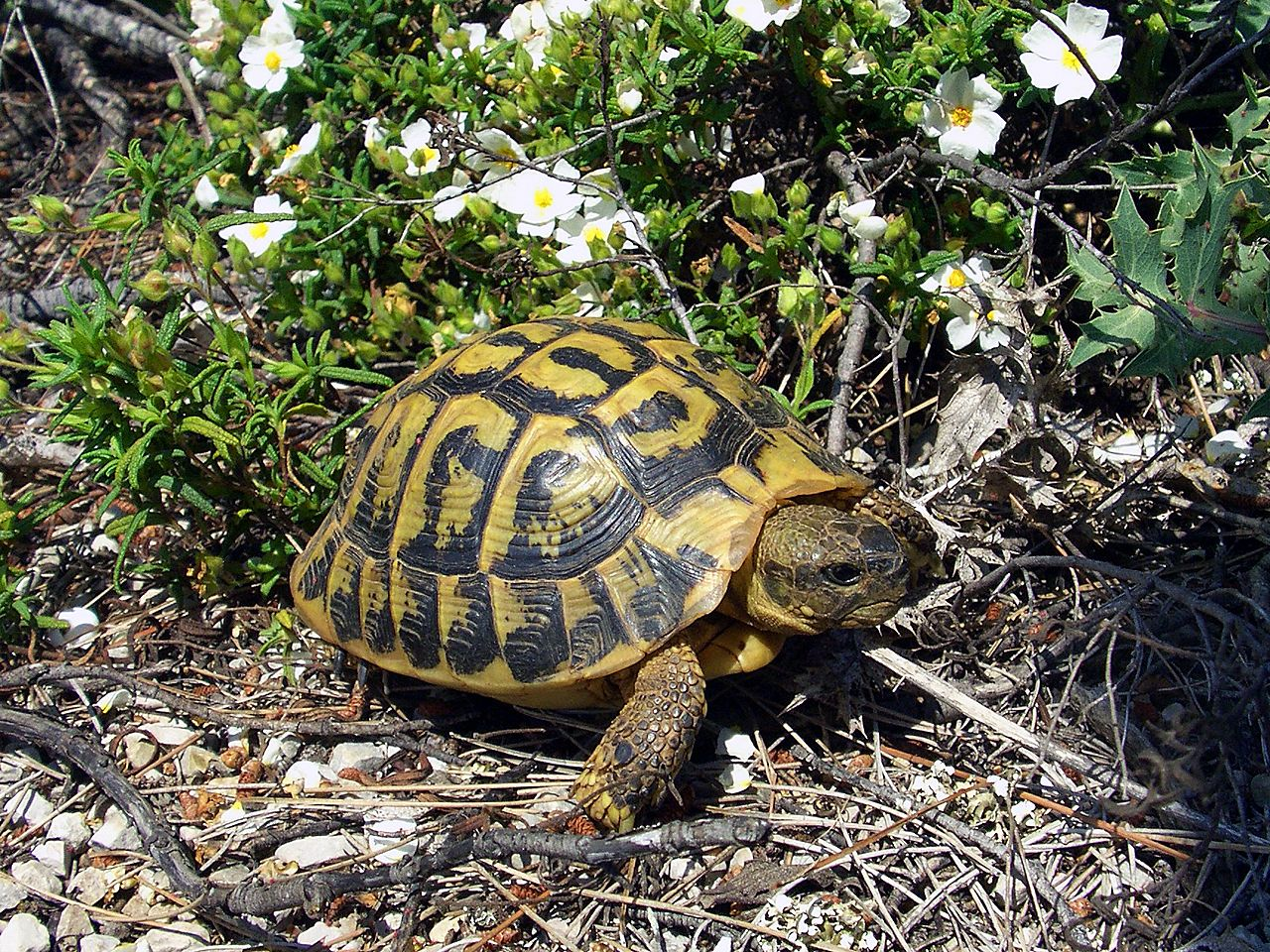
- Testudo hermanni hermanni in a bush of white flowers.

Scientific classification
- Domain: Eukaryota
- Kingdom: Animalia
- Phylum: Chordata
- Class: Reptilia
- Order: Testudines
- Suborder: Cryptodira
- Superfamily: Testudinoidea
- Family: Testudinidae
- Genus: Testudo
- Species: T. hermanni
- Subspecies: T. h. hermanni

Trinomial name
- Testudo hermanni hermanni Gmelin, 1789

= Testudo hermanni hermanni =

Subspecies of reptile

Testudo hermanni hermanni, also known as the Western Hermann's tortoise or known as the Italian tortoise, is a subspecies of tortoise. The subspecies has a rich golden yellow shell with sharp contrast. Behind the eye is a lack of a yellow patch which Testudo hermanni robertmertensi has. T. h. hermanni are located in southern France on the island of Corsica, the Balearic Islands, eastern Spain, Sicily, Sardinia, and central and south Italy.

Testudo hermanni hermanni was named after Johann Hermann from the years 1738 to 1800. Johann Hermann was a French Natural history professor and a herpetologist in the city of Strasbourg, France.
