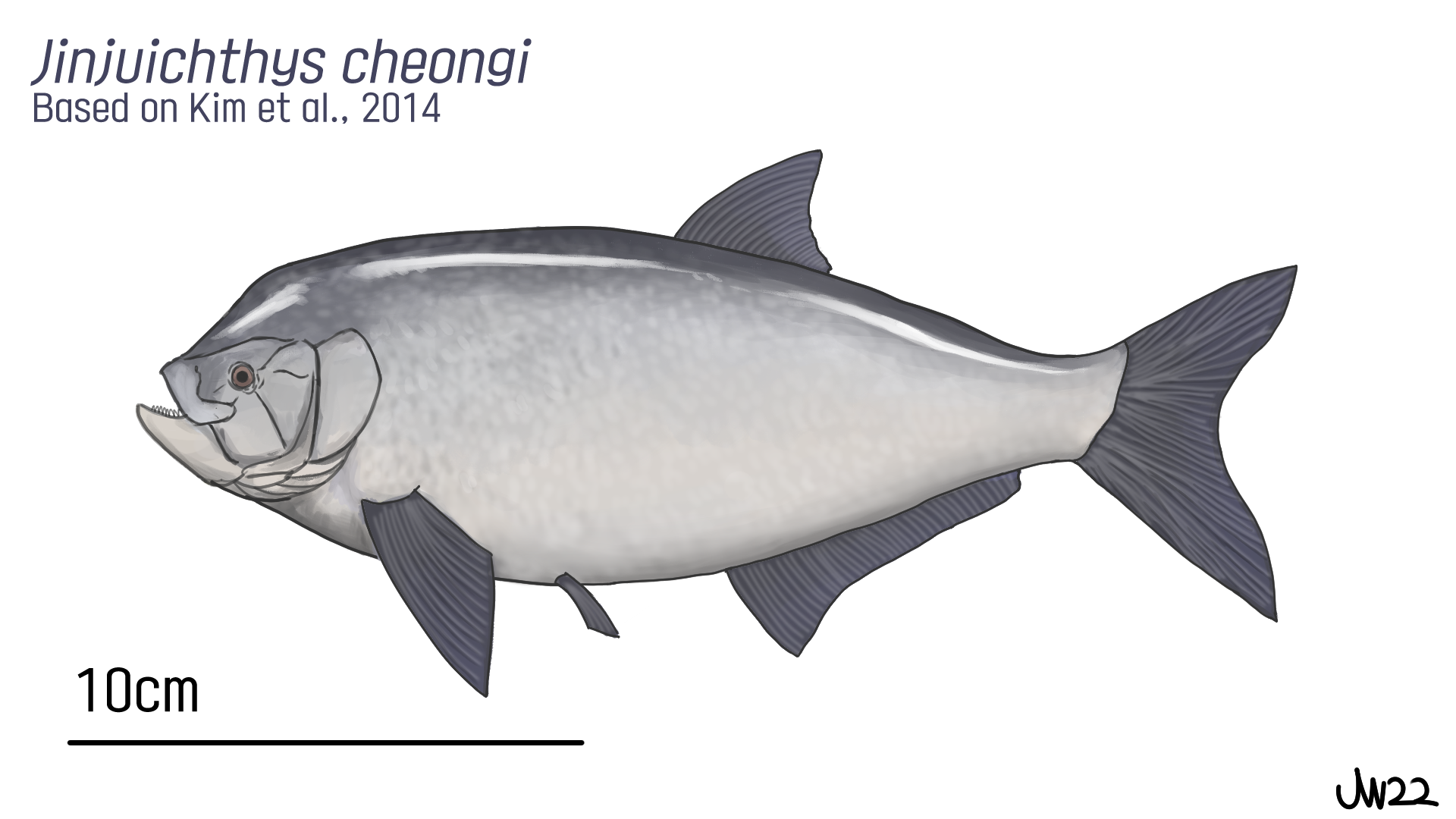
- Hypothetical restoration of Jinjuichthys as an ichthyodectiform

Scientific classification
- Kingdom: Animalia
- Phylum: Chordata
- Class: Actinopterygii
- Division: Teleostei
- Order: †Ichthyodectiformes (?)
- Family: †Chuhsiungichthyidae
- Genus: †Jinjuichthys; Kim et al., 2014
- Species: †J. cheongi

Binomial name
- †Jinjuichthys cheongi Kim et al., 2014

= Jinjuichthys =

Jinjuichthys Temporal range: Albian 112.4–106.5 Ma

Extinct genus of ray-finned fish

Jinjuichthys is an extinct genus of teleost ray-finned fish from the Early Cretaceous (Albian stage) of South Korea. The genus contains a single species, Jinjuichthys cheongi, known from two specimens found in the Jinju Formation. Compared to its relatives, Jinjuichthys has a very deep and short body. The exact placement of Jinjuichthys and its close relatives has been argued with papers originally suggesting a placement within Ichthyodectiformes. However more recent papers have suggested that differences between members of Chuhsiungichthyidae and agreed upon ichthyodectiforms are numerous enough to remove them from the order.

== History and Naming ==
Jinjuichthys is known from two specimens with the holotype specimen (PSU V 1011) being made up of a largely complete fish with the only missing parts of the skeleton being parts of the skull roof and the caudal region. The paratype (PSU V 1012) much less complete, only being made up of the back portion of the fish that includes a posterior part of the dorsal fin. Both of these specimens were collected from an outcrop of the Jinju Formation in Jinju City, South Gyeongsang Province, South Korea. After collection, the material was then placed within the collection of the Pusan National University in Busan, South Korea. These specimens were described by Haang-Mook Kim and coauthors in a 2014 publication.

The generic name Jinjuichthys refers to the city the material was found in along with the Greek word for fish, "ichthys". The specific name "cheongi" is in honor of Cheong Chang Hi who was the former president of Geological Society of Korea and a member of the Korean Academy of Sciences.

== Description ==
Based on the holotype specimen of Jinjuichthys, it was a medium-sized fish with an estimated standard length of 187 millimetres (7.4 in). Unlike more traditional ichtyodectiforms, the body of the fish is fairly deep with a standard length to body depth ratio of 2.7. This depth makes it the fish with the greatest body length ratio of any fish assigned to the order. The deepest part of the body is located right in front of the dorsal fin.

=== Skull ===
The skull of Jinjuichthys, like other ichtyodectiforms, is sort and deep with its length to depth ratio being only 1.1 and it making up about a forth of the standard length. The skull roof is the least well preserved portion of the skull, both being incomplete and having sutures that are hard to make out. The rostrodermethmoid is the front-most bone of the skull roof and possessed processes that project outwards and downwards from the main bone. There is a bone positioned in front of the rostrodermethmoid, however it is believed to potentially represent the ethmopalatine which could have been moved. Sutured to the rostrodermethmoid is the frontal which is relatively large and is in turn sutured to the ethmoid. This bone is similarly large and makes up a portion of the upper section of the orbit. Behind these bones are the unfused parietals and pterotic, with the latter possessing a set of branching ridges on the dermal portion suggested to represent the infraorbital sensory line. Behind these bones is a plate-like bone that could be the extrascapular.

The jaws of Jinjuichthys are decently short, with the back of the jaw ending slightly behind the middle of the orbit. A bone preserved towards the front of the skull is suggested to be the premaxilla and is slightly bent with one of the ends being slightly thicker than the other. The maxilla is much larger than this bone and is overall thick with a small serrated portion located on the ventral edge of the bone. Articulated to the left maxilla is the second supramaxilla. It is ovular in shape and has an extended, rod-like portion at the front which is similar to what is seen in other more basal teleosts. A second similar bone located near the second supramaxilla is suggested to be the first supramaxilla. The dentary is similarly short, though deep, with a coronoid process that is located at about the middle of the bone's length. Teeth are present on the dentary by only on one third of the bone, with this portion being forwardly inclined. These twenty or so teeth are all the same size and are pointed inwards. The mandibular sensory canal is located under a groove that is parallel to the ventral edge of the dentary. Six or seven pores are located in this area. The angular is preserved behind the dentary, it possesses an articular facet for the quadrate at the back corner of the bone. The quadrate is overall fan-shaped with a rod-shaped ventral process, similar to what is seen in other teleosts. The parasphenoid is visible within orbit and possesses a small branching portion, this is believed to be what is left of the basipterygoid process. Along with this bone, the ectopterygoid is also preserved near the angular. A number of pieces are also preserved under other skull bones, these are suggested to potentially be parts of the entopterygoid and metapterygoid. Similar to most of the jaw bones, all of these palatal bones lack any evidence that they had teeth. The opercular series is largely preserved though all of the bones are partly incomplete. The frontmost bone, the preopercle, has a horizontal branch shorter than the vertical one which causes it to be "L" shaped. Also causing this is the incomplete back and ventral portions of the bone. The opercle is a large, ovular bone with a straight anterior edge. Below it are the interopercle and subopercle, both of which are much smaller than the opercle and are missing their ventral portions like the preopercle. The hyomandibular is preserved on top of the preopercle. An articular area is located on the dorsal portion of the bone that would have fit with the hyomandibular fossa of the pterotic in the braincase.

=== Postcranium ===
The pectoral girdle of Jinjuichthys differs from the girdles seen in ichtyodectiforms and other basal telosts in a few ways relating to the postcleithra and post-temporal. The post-temporal is a thin bone with long branches on the dorsal and ventral sides that are much longer than what is seen in both of the aforementioned groups. Compared to other genera placed within Ichthyodectiformes, Jinjuichthys possesses an extra postcleithra in having a total of three. These small, thin bones that widen towards the end attach to the posterior side of the cleithrum. The largest bone in the pectoral girdle is the cleithrum, which has a slightly bent shape and has a horizontal and vertical branch of very similar lengths. The vertical branch, however, is slightly pointed and partially covered by the bottom-most portion of the supracleithrum. The vertebral column of Jinjuichthys is made up of a total of fifty centra with twenty two of these being abdominal and the other twenty eight being caudal. Each of the centra are fairly stout and have between four and five ridges with grooves in between on their lateral surfaces. Outside some of the hemal arches found towards the back of the body, all of the neural and hemal arches are not fused to the centra. A number of long supraneurals are located in front of the dorsal fin bases with the exact number being unknown do to the disarticulation of these bones. Another set of long bones can be found above the first few vertebrae with these being suggested to represent epineurals that would have articulated with the braincase. A total of twenty one to twenty two pairs of ribs are identified in the specimens. The pelvic bone is thick though tapering with the posterior end being thicker than the anterior one. The caudal skeleton is overall similar to other basal teleosts in having two ural centra. These articulate with two lower and five upper hypurals respectively. The upper hypurals possess widened bases which is visible between the first uroneural and the branched caudal rays. The fifth through seventh hypurals are almost completely covered by the bases of the fin rays that make up the upper lobed of the caudal fin. Beyond these are a total of five uroneurals with the first one being larger than the others. The first uroneural, unlike the others, widens are one side. This bone along with the second uroneural cover an upper portion of the first two preural centra. A separate urodermal is preserved and is located towards the middle of a unbrached principled fin ray.

The procurrent caudal fin rays that make up the forked caudal fin are supported by a total of five neural and four hemal spines. The amount of principal caudal fin rays differs between the lobes with there being twelve upper and eight lower rays. The amount of principal caudal fin rays is very characteristic of more basal teleosts in having a total of ten on the upper lobe and nine on the lower lobe. All but one of these rays are branched on each of the lobes. Neither of the pair fins are completely preserves with the more well preserved of the two, the pectoral fins, being made up of at least eleven fin rays. The first few of the rays are more robust than the others, most of these rays are segmented away from their bases. The pelvic fins are poorly preserved but would have been positioned at the midpoint between the pectoral and anal fins. The anal fin isn't completely preserved though based on the amount of pterygiophores preserved, it has been estimated that it would have been made up of forty fin rays. Due to the poor preservation however, the exact shape of the fin is unknown. The dorsal fin is the most well preserved fin known from Jinjuichthys, being made up of at least twenty fin rays. Though most of the anterior rays aren't preserved, the decrease in ray size along with preserved portion show that it could have been sick-shaped. Though extremely fragmentary, scales are preserved on the body. Based on what is preserved, they are thin, cycloid scales with a large amount of concentric circuli.

== Classification ==
The exact placement of Jinjuichthys, though more commonly Chuhsiungichthyidae as a whole, is a point of contention among researchers in current years. Based on a 1977 publication by Patterson and Rosen, the group fits within Ichtyodectiformes due to the position and shape of the dorsal fin along with them only having a single series of teeth in the jaws. Though the initial description paper did not include a phylogeny, a later 2019 paper by Lionel Cavin and Rodney W. Berrell inserted it within there phylogeny, with it resulting in a clade with it and Mesoclupea falling within a polytomy with Occithrissops and being overall placed closer to Jurassic members of the clade rather than Cretaceous ones. However, a 2024 publication by Jesús Alvarado-Ortega argued against the placement of Chuhsiungichthyidae within Ichtyodectiformes due the lack of saber-shaped rays on the pelvic and anal fins along with uronerals that only cover a portion of the preural and ural centra. Alvarado-Ortega also brought up that the jaws of Jinjuichthys and other chuhsiungichthyids are fairly different than what he calls "true" ichthyodectiforms. This is due to a combination of their short jaws along with the fact that the jaw opens more anteriorly than more accepted members of Ichtyodectiformes. In one of the two phylogenic hypotheses within the paper, Jinjuichthys was included which resulted in a similar position with the main difference being the addition of Thrissops within the previously mentioned polytomy. Even with the evidence put forward in the paper, Alvarado-Ortega doesn't remove Chuhsiungichthyidae from Ichtyodectiformes. Instead, he suggests a reassessment of the osteology of members of the family. The cladograms from both the mentioned papers can be found below:

Cavin & Berrell (2019)

- - Allothrissops mesogaster
  - - Thrissops from Kimmerage
    - - Occithrissops wilsoni
      - - - Jinjuichthys cheongi
          - Mesoclupea showchangensis
      - - Thrissops formosus
        - - Varraesichthys bloti
          - - Dugaldia emmilta
            - - Ogunichthys triangularis
              - - Ichthyodectoidei
                  - Ichthyodectidae
                  - - Cladocyclidae
                    - Saurodontidae

Alvarado-Ortega (2024)

- - Allothrissops mesogaster
  - - Occithrissops wilsoni
    - Jinjuichthys cheongi
    - Mesoclupea showchangensis
    - Thrissops formosus
    - Thrissops "Kimmeridigian"
    - - Varraesichthys bloti
      - Dugaldia emmilta
      - Ogunichthys triangularis
      - Unamichthys espinosai
      - - Chirocentrites coroninii
        - - Eubiodectes libanicus
          - - Gillicus serridens
            - - Chyromystus mawsonii
              - Cladocyclus gardneri
              - Cladocyclus geddesi
      - - Ghrisichthys bardacki
        - - Ichtyodectes ctenodon
          - - Xiphactinus audax
            - Cooyoo australis
      - - Vallecillichthys multivertebratum
        - - Saurodon elongatus
          - Saurodon intermedius
          - - Saurodon leanus
            - Saurocephalus lanciformis
      - - Gillicus arcuatus
      - - Bardackichthys carteri
        - - - Amakusaichthys benammii
            - Amakusaichthys goshouraensis
          - - Heckelichthys preopercularis
            - Heckelichthys vexillifer
            - Heckelichthys "Vellecillo"

== Paleoenvironment ==
The Jinju Formation represents a freshwater lake that would have been present throughout the year, with different evidence like the flora and geology pointing towards an transition from a more humid to a more arid climate. Even with this increased aridity in the area, the climate is still considered to be temperate. Based on the floral assemblages found throughout the formation, the biota most likely represents a temperate intermontane savanna. The aridity has been suggested to be due to a rain-shadow rather than an expansion of the subtropical belt. Within this savanna, the dominant larger plants were Classopollis along with members of Cupressaceae, Krassiloviaceae, and Pinaceae. Ginkgoes and cycads were much less common, though taxa such as Umaltolepis and Nilssonia have been found. Other smaller plants like the fern Ruffordia and Equisetum were also fairly common, filling the niches of herbs and smaller shrubs along the margins of the lakes. Throughout the timespan that the Jinju Formation preserves, the average rainfall throughout the year fluctuated between 500–1,500 millimetres (20–59 in). The common presence of charcoal also suggests that wildfires were also fairly common within the savanna. Though no body fossils of terrestrial vertebrates have been found at the formation, a few other fish like the osteoglossiform Wakinoichthys and the bowfin Sinamia have also been found at the formation. Terrestrial vertebrates are known through the form of ichnofossils. A large number of trackways belonging to frogs, mammals, lizards, crocodylomorphs, theropods, and sauropods have been found at the formation. Most of the fauna found belong to an invertebrate assemblage largely made up of insects, though crustaceans and mollusks are also present.
