= Eurystichthys =

Eurystichthys Temporal range: Kimmeridgian

Scientific classification
- Kingdom: Animalia
- Phylum: Chordata
- Class: Actinopterygii
- Order: †Pachycormiformes (?)
- Genus: †Eurystichthys; Whitley, 1950
- Species: †E. brongniarti

Binomial name
- †Eurystichthys brongniarti (Sauvage, 1877)

Synonyms
- Eurystethus Sauvage, 1877

Extinct genus of fishes

Eurystichthys is an extinct genus of marine ray-finned fish from the Late Jurassic.

== Naming ==
It contains a single species, E. brongniarti from the Kimmeridgian of France. The genus was coined by Whitley (1950) as a replacement for Eurystethus Sauvage, 1877, a genus name preoccupied by a stinkbug described by Mayr (1864). Woodward suggested a potential relationship to the ichthyodectiform Thrissops or enigmatic fish Pachythrissops, while Sepkoski (2002) tentatively placed it in the Pachycormiformes.
