= Occithrissops =

Occithrissops Temporal range: Middle Jurassic

Scientific classification
- Kingdom: Animalia
- Phylum: Chordata
- Class: Actinopterygii
- Order: †Ichthyodectiformes
- Genus: †Occithrissops; Schaeffer & Patterson, 1984

Type species
- †Occithrissops willsoni Schaeffer & Patterson, 1984

Extinct genus of ray-finned fishes

Occithrissops is an extinct genus of ray-finned fish of the Jurassic, described from Sundance Formation. The genus name of Occithrissops refers to the occidental occurrence of the genus and its relationship to Thrissops.

== Description ==
Occithrissops reached length about 20 centimetres (7.9 in). Although it is placed within Ichthyodectiformes, it have some different characters compared to other Jurassic ichthyodectiform Thrissops and Allothrissops, and original description described this taxon as Ichthyodectiformes incertae sedis. Later study considered this taxon is basal ichthyodectiform, and shared some morphological similarities with Jinjuichthys.
