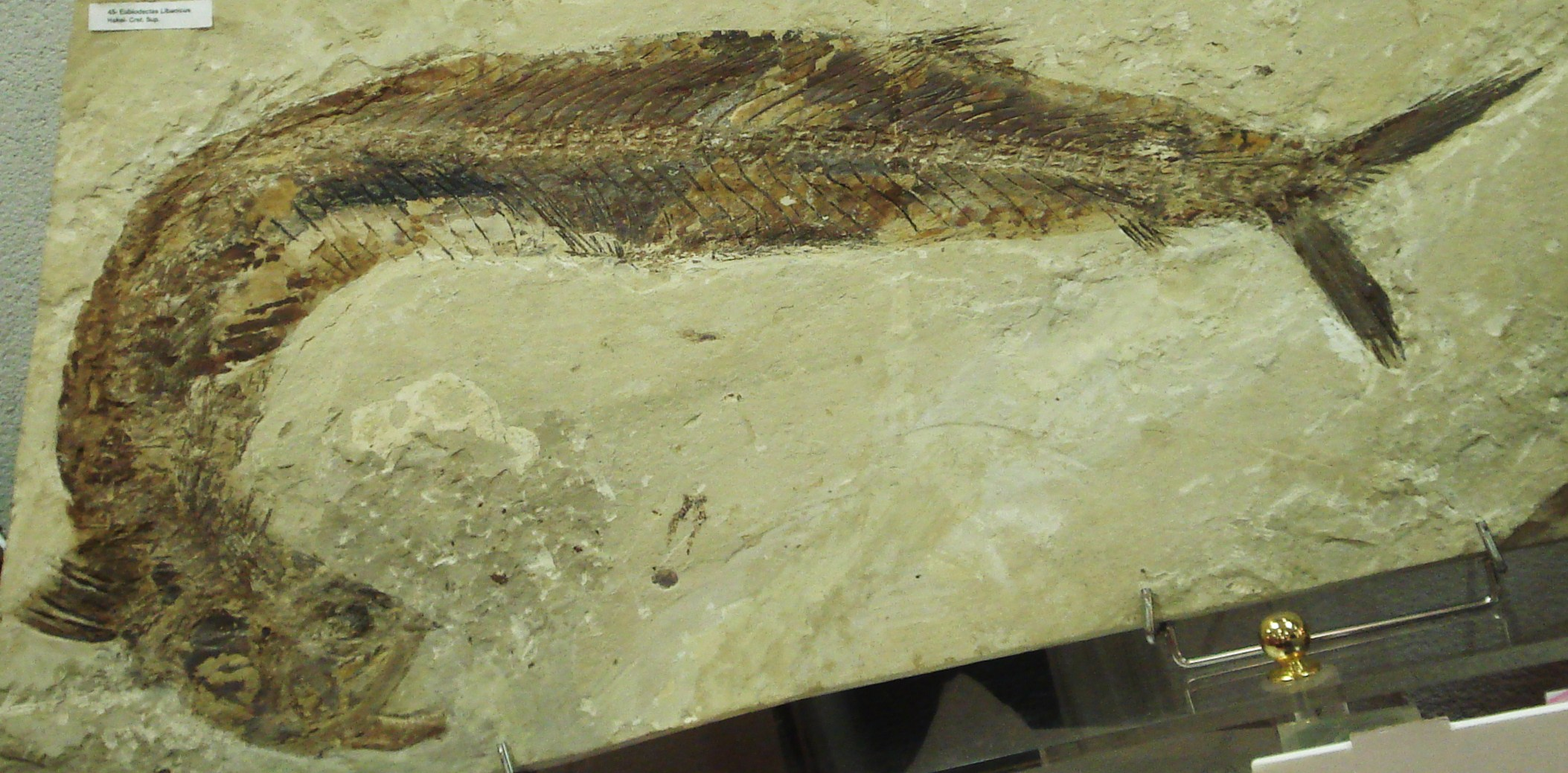
- Fossil of E. libanicus

Scientific classification
- Kingdom: Animalia
- Phylum: Chordata
- Class: Actinopterygii
- Order: †Ichthyodectiformes
- Family: †Cladocyclidae
- Genus: †Eubiodectes; Hay, 1903
- Species: †E. libanicus

Binomial name
- †Eubiodectes libanicus (Pictet & Humbert, 1866)

Synonyms
- ?†Clupea gigantea Heckel, 1849; †Chirocentrites libanicus Pictet & Humbert, 1866; †Ichthyodectes libanicus (Pictet & Humbert, 1866)

= Eubiodectes =

Eubiodectes Temporal range: Late Cenomanian

Extinct genus of ray-finned fishes

Eubiodectes is an extinct genus of marine ray-finned fish that lived during the Late Cretaceous. It contains a single species, E. libanicus, known from well-preserved fossils from the Cenomanian-aged Sannine Formation of Lebanon It was a member of the Ichthyodectiformes, famously known as "bulldog fishes".

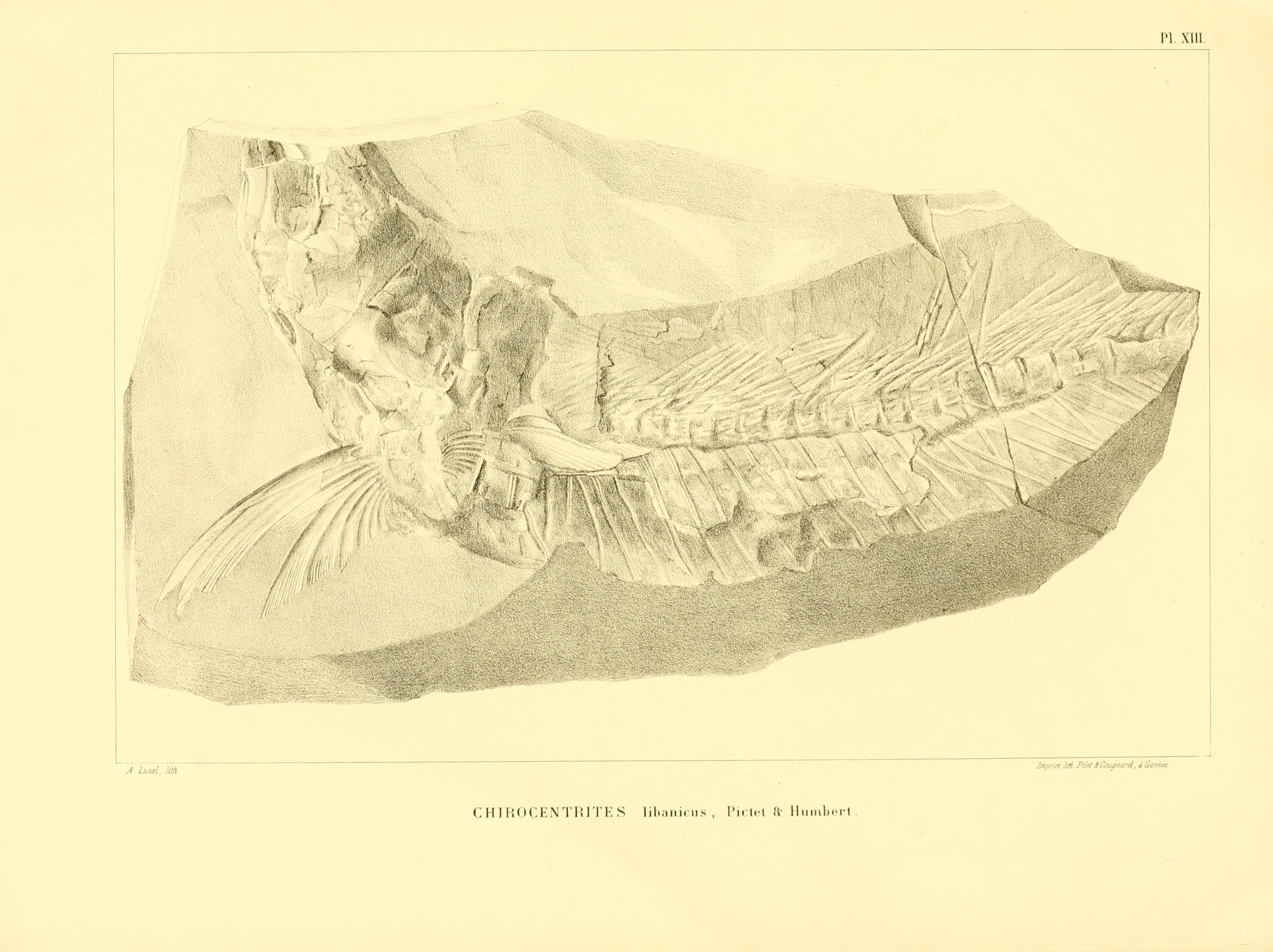
Illustration of the type specimen.

It was originally described as Chirocentrites libanicus, then later moved to Ichthyodectes libanicus. It was moved to its own genus in 1903. Clupea gigantea Heckel, 1849, a species described earlier based on an indeterminate partial specimen, may be synonymous.
