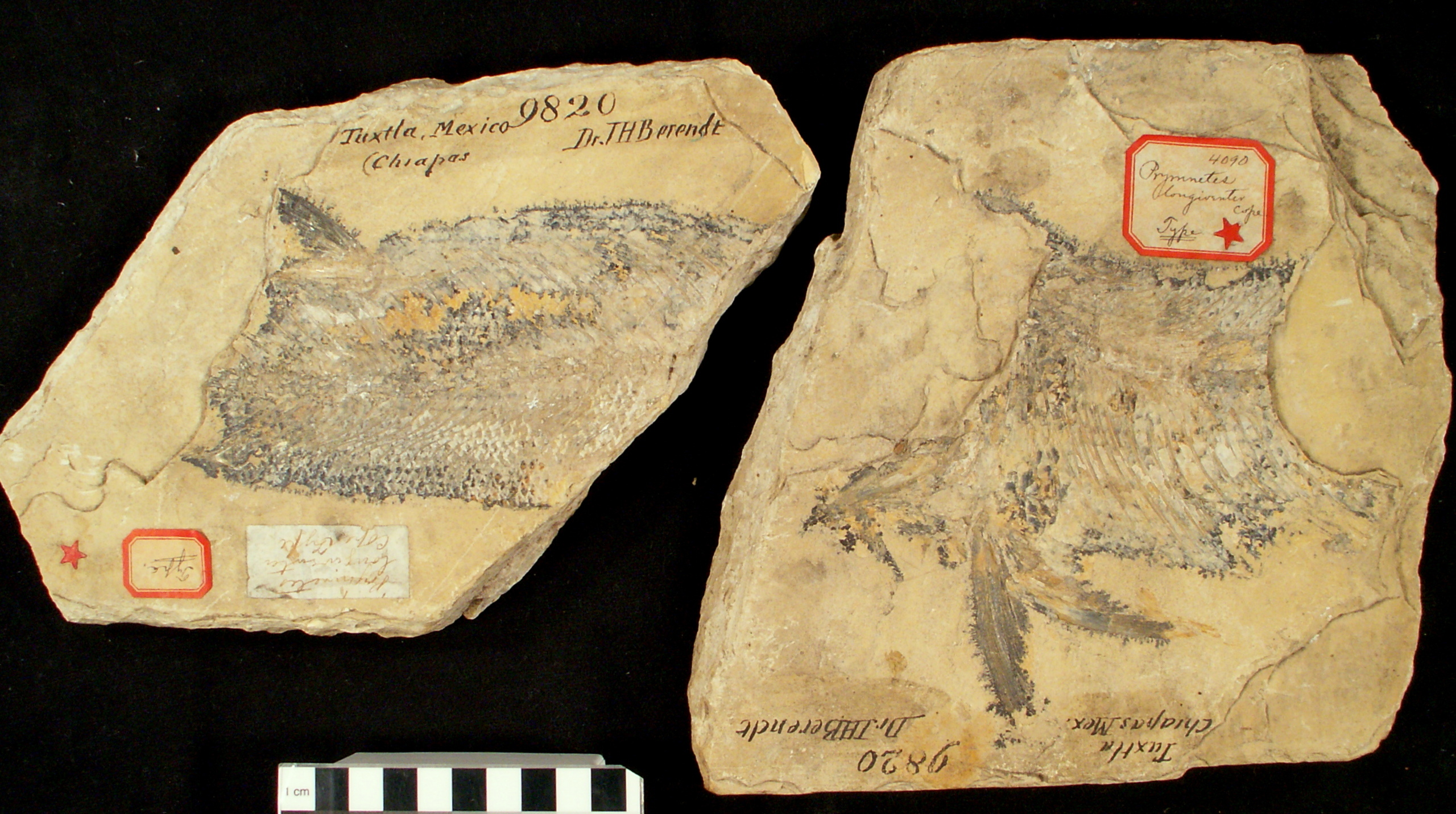
- Holotype of Prymnetes longiventer

Scientific classification
- Kingdom: Animalia
- Phylum: Chordata
- Class: Actinopterygii
- Division: Teleostei
- Order: †Ichthyodectiformes
- Genus: †Prymnetes; Cope, 1871

= Prymnetes =

Prymnetes Temporal range: Late Cretaceous

Extinct genus of ray-finned fishes

Prymnetes is an extinct genus of ray-finned fish that lived during the Late Cretaceous epoch.

== Discovery ==
The holotype specimen of Prymnetes was found by Dr. J. Berendt near Tuxtla Gutiérrez in Chiapas, Mexico, which he then sent to the Smithsonian Institution, where it was subsequently studied by the paleontologist Edward Drinker Cope. The holotype specimen was preserved on a block of lime slate, that preserved the body in lateral view and the head in ventral view. The holotype also preserves 25 longitudinal series of scales anterior to the ventral fins.

== Description ==
Prymnetes was 0.530 meters in length, its body was long and slender, its head was tall and deep, its mouth faced upwards, its orbits were big and the holotype also preserves three obtuse teeth on the anterior end of the premaxilla, the dentary was stout, its pectoral fins were moderate in length and the ventral fins were short and small, the anal fin was also short and small and the tail was bifurcated, its vertebrae were sulcated.

== Classification ==
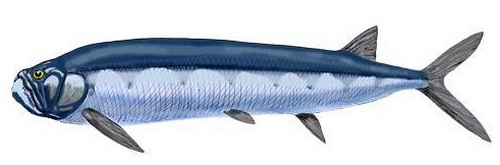
Life restoration of Chirocentrites coroninii, a fellow Ichtyodectiformes

Prymnetes was classified as an Ichthyodectiformes by Jesús Alvarado-Ortega in 2004 and as a Pachycormiformes by Sepkoski in 2002.
