= Carsothrissops =

Carsothrissops Temporal range: Cenomanian

Scientific classification
- Domain: Eukaryota
- Kingdom: Animalia
- Phylum: Chordata
- Class: Actinopterygii
- Order: †Ichthyodectiformes
- Genus: †Carsothrissops d'Erasmo, 1946
- Species: †C. delorenzi

Binomial name
- †Carsothrissops delorenzi d'Erasmo, 1946

Extinct genus of ray-finned fishes

Carsothrissops ("Karst Thrissops") is an extinct genus of marine ray-finned fish that lived during the Cenomanian. It contains a single species, C. delorenzi from Komen, Slovenia.
