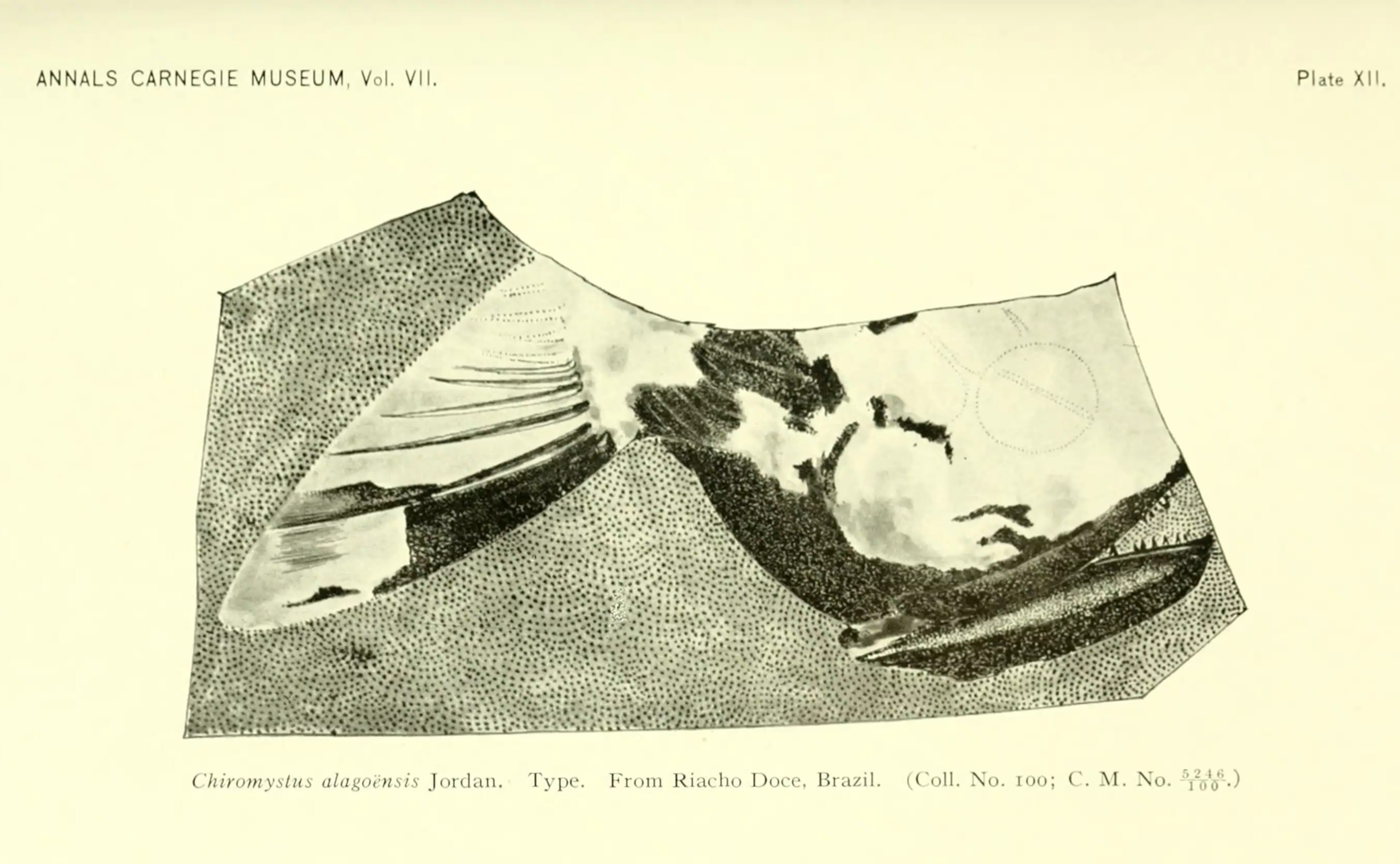
- Fossil specimen of C. alagoensis

Scientific classification
- Kingdom: Animalia
- Phylum: Chordata
- Class: Actinopterygii
- Order: †Ichthyodectiformes
- Family: †Cladocyclidae
- Genus: †Chiromystus; Cope, 1886

Type species
- †Chiromystus mawsoni Cope, 1886

Species
- See text

Synonyms
- ?Itaparica Silva-Santos, 1986

= Chiromystus =

Chiromystus Temporal range: Early Cretaceous, late Hauterivian to Aptian

Extinct genus of fishes

Chiromystus is an extinct genus of freshwater ichthyodectiform ray-finned fish that inhabited large rift lakes on the supercontinent of West Gondwana during the Early Cretaceous. Three to four species are known from both of West Gondwana's constituent continents (South America & Africa).

The following species are known:

- C. alagoensis Jordan, 1910 - Aptian of Alagoas, Brazil (Muribeca Formation)
- C. guinensis (Weiler, 1922) - Aptian of Equatorial Guinea & Gabon (Cocobeach Formation) (=?Chirocentrites guinensis Weiler, 1922)
- C. mawsoni Cope, 1886 (type species) - late Hauterivian/early Barremian of Bahia, Brazil (Marfim Formation of Bahia Group), Aptian of Alagoas, Brazil (Muribeca Formation)
- ?C. woodwardi Silva-Santos, 1947 - late Hauterivian/early Barremian of Bahia, Brazil (Marfim Formation) (=Itaparica woodwardi (Silva-Santos, 1947))

The classification of C. woodwardi remains uncertain. It was initially confused with C. mawsoni before being described as a distinct species in 1947. In 1986, it was reclassified into its own genus, Itaparica, but the basis for this reclassification is scant, and it is thus tentatively retained in Chiromystus.

Chiromystus was initially classified in the family Chirocentridae (the modern wolf-herrings) before being moved into the extinct Ichthyodectiformes. This genus was also initially synonymized with the related but marine genus Cladocyclus for a time.

A partial ichthyodectiform skull reminiscent of either Chiromystus or Gillicus was recovered from earliest Cenomanian-aged rocks in a drill core taken from the Cape Verde Rise in the southern Atlantic Ocean, about 699.9 metres (2,296 ft) below the surface. The morphology of the specimen closely resembles that of Chiromystus, as does its occurrence in between South America and Africa, but it appears to have inhabited marine habitats, in contrast to Chiromystus which inhabited freshwater and estuarine habitats.
