= Altamuraichthys =

Altamuraichthys Temporal range: Late Campanian/Early Maastrichtian

Scientific classification
- Kingdom: Animalia
- Phylum: Chordata
- Class: Actinopterygii
- Order: †Ichthyodectiformes
- Family: †Ichthyodectidae
- Genus: †Altamuraichthys; Taverne, 2016
- Species: †A. meleleoi

Binomial name
- †Altamuraichthys meleleoi Taverne, 2016

Altamuraichthys is an extinct genus of marine ichthyodectid ray-finned fish that lived during the Late Cretaceous epoch. It contains a single species, A. meleleoi, known from a complete fossil skeleton found in the Campanian to Maastrichtian-aged Calcare di Altamura Formation near Nardo, Italy.

It was initially described in the family Ichthyodectidae. However, a 2024 study on Amakusaichthys, which moved the latter genus into the new family Heckelichthyidae, noted the close morphological similarities between Altamuraichthys and Amakusaichthys, and suggested that the former genus may also belong to that family, although it was not reclassified pending further research.
