= Chuhsiungichthys =

Chuhsiungichthys Temporal range: Early to Late Cretaceous

Scientific classification
- Kingdom: Animalia
- Phylum: Chordata
- Class: Actinopterygii
- Order: †Ichthyodectiformes (?)
- Family: †Chuhsiungichthyidae
- Genus: †Chuhsiungichthys; Lew, 1974

Type species
- †Chuhsiungichthys tsanglingensis Lew, 1974

Species
- †C. tsanglingensis Lew 1974; †C. yanagidai Yabumoto 1994; †C. japonicus Yabumoto 1994

Genus of ray-finned fish

Chuhsiungichthys is an extinct genus of ichthyodectiform ray-finned fish that lived in freshwater environments in what is now Yunnan, China, and Kyushu, Japan during the Cretaceous. It differs from its sister genus, Mesoclupea, primarily by having a comparatively more anteriorly-placed dorsal fin.

It contains the following species:

- †C. tsanglingensis Lew, 1974 – Turonian-Coniacian of Chuhsiung, Yunnan, China (Jiangdihe Formation)
- †C. japonicus Yabumoto, 1994 – Albian of Kyushu, Japan (Kumagai Formation)
- †C. yanagidai Yabumoto, 1994 – Hauterivian-Barremian of Kyushu, Japan (Dobaru Formation)

== See also ==
- Prehistoric fish
- List of prehistoric bony fish
