= Sultanuvaisia =

Sultanuvaisia antiqua Temporal range: Late Cretaceous

Scientific classification
- Kingdom: Animalia
- Phylum: Chordata
- Class: Actinopterygii
- Order: †Ichthyodectiformes
- Genus: †Sultanuvaisia; Nessov, 1981
- Species: †S. antiqua

Binomial name
- †Sultanuvaisia antiqua Nessov, 1981

Extinct genus of ray-finned fishes

Sultanuvaisia is an extinct genus of ichthyodectiform ray-finned fish from the Late Cretaceous of Kyzyl Kum, central Asia. It was named by Lev Nessov in 1981. At first, he tentatively described the fossil material as jaw fragments of a ctenochasmatid pterosaur (a flying reptile), but reinterpreted Sultanuvaisia as a fish in 1986. The type species is S. antiqua.
