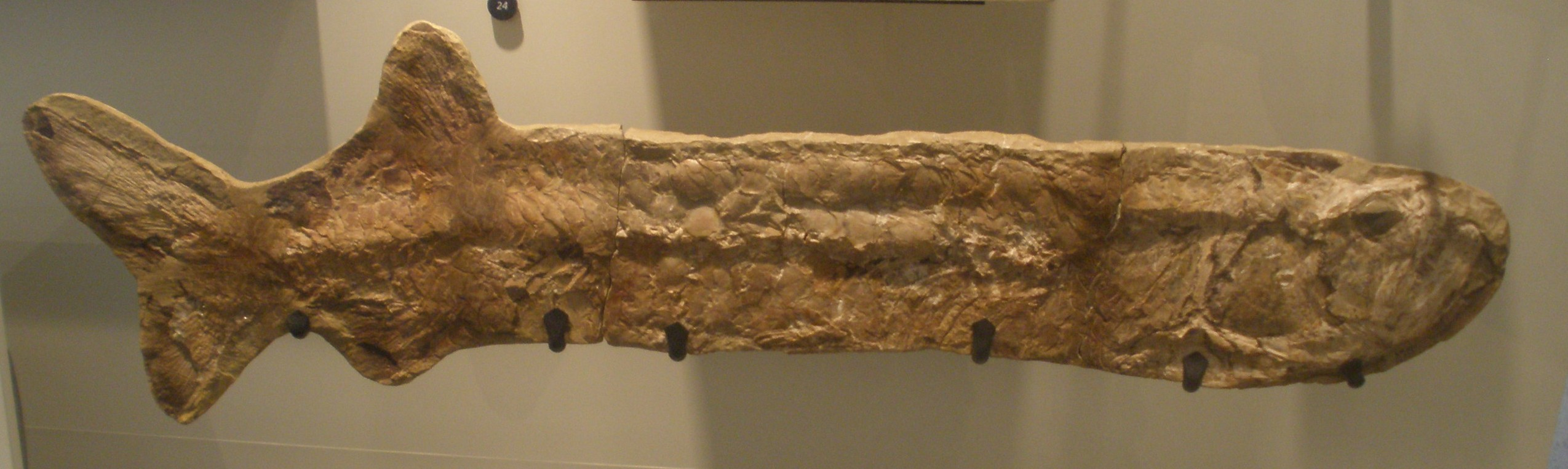
- Fossil of C. gardneri

Scientific classification
- Kingdom: Animalia
- Phylum: Chordata
- Class: Actinopterygii
- Order: †Ichthyodectiformes
- Family: †Cladocyclidae
- Genus: †Cladocyclus; Agassiz, 1841

Species
- C. gardneri Agassiz, 1841; C. geddesi Berrell, 2014

= Cladocyclus =

Cladocyclus Temporal range: Albian-Cenomanian ~112.6–94.3 Ma

Extinct genus of ray-finned fishes

Cladocyclus (derived from the Greek κλάδος/kládos ("branch") and κύκλος/kýklos ("circle")) is an extinct genus of marine ichthyodectiform ray-finned fish from the middle Cretaceous. It was a predator of about 1.20 metres (3.9 ft) in length.

== Taxonomy ==
It contains the following species:

- †C. gardneri Agassiz, 1841 - Albian of northeastern Brazil (Romualdo and Crato Formations of the Araripe Basin) (=C. ferus Santos, 1950)
- †C. geddesi Berell, 2014 - late Albian of Queensland, Australia (Winton Formation)

An indeterminate specimen, previously assigned to Chirocentrites, is known from the Albian-aged Pietraroja Plattenkalk of Italy. Indeterminate specimens, represented by complete remains, are also known from the Cenomanian of Morocco, which are not to be confused with C. pankowskii, which was discovered in the Kem Kem Beds in 2007, but has since been reclassified to the genus Aidachar. The freshwater genus Chiromystus, also known from Brazil in older Cretaceous deposits, has been previously synonymized with Cladocyclus, but is now generally considered distinct.

The species C. lewesiensis Agassiz, 1887 from the Cenomanian of England and C. strehlensis Geinitz, 1868 from the Turonian of Germany, which were described based only on fossil scales, are considered nomen dubia and likely do not belong to this genus. The dubious species C. occidentalis Leidy, 1857 from the Coniacian-to-Campanian-aged Niobrara Formation of South Dakota, US is based on scales that likely belong to Ichthyodectes ctenodon.

== Ecology ==
Although C. gardneri and other cladocyclids are generally thought of as marine fish, the Australian species C. geddesi was recovered from a freshwater formation, despite showing clear adaptations to the open ocean. This specimen may have been of an individual that swam upstream from the ocean.

== Gallery ==
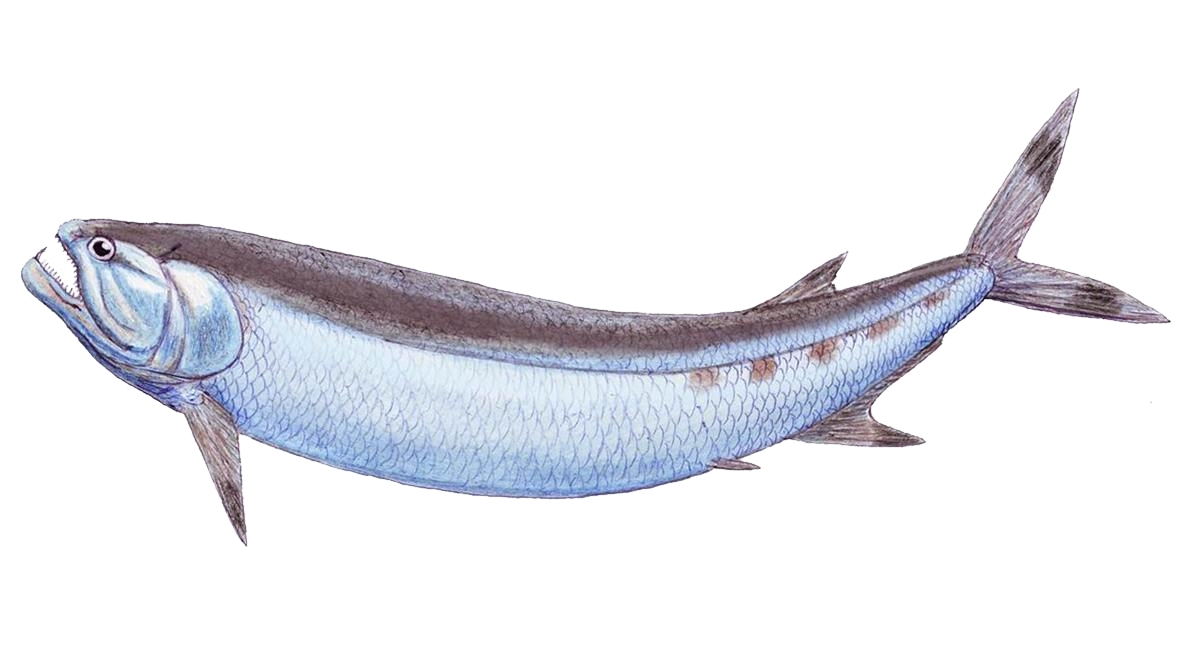
Cladocyclus gardneri

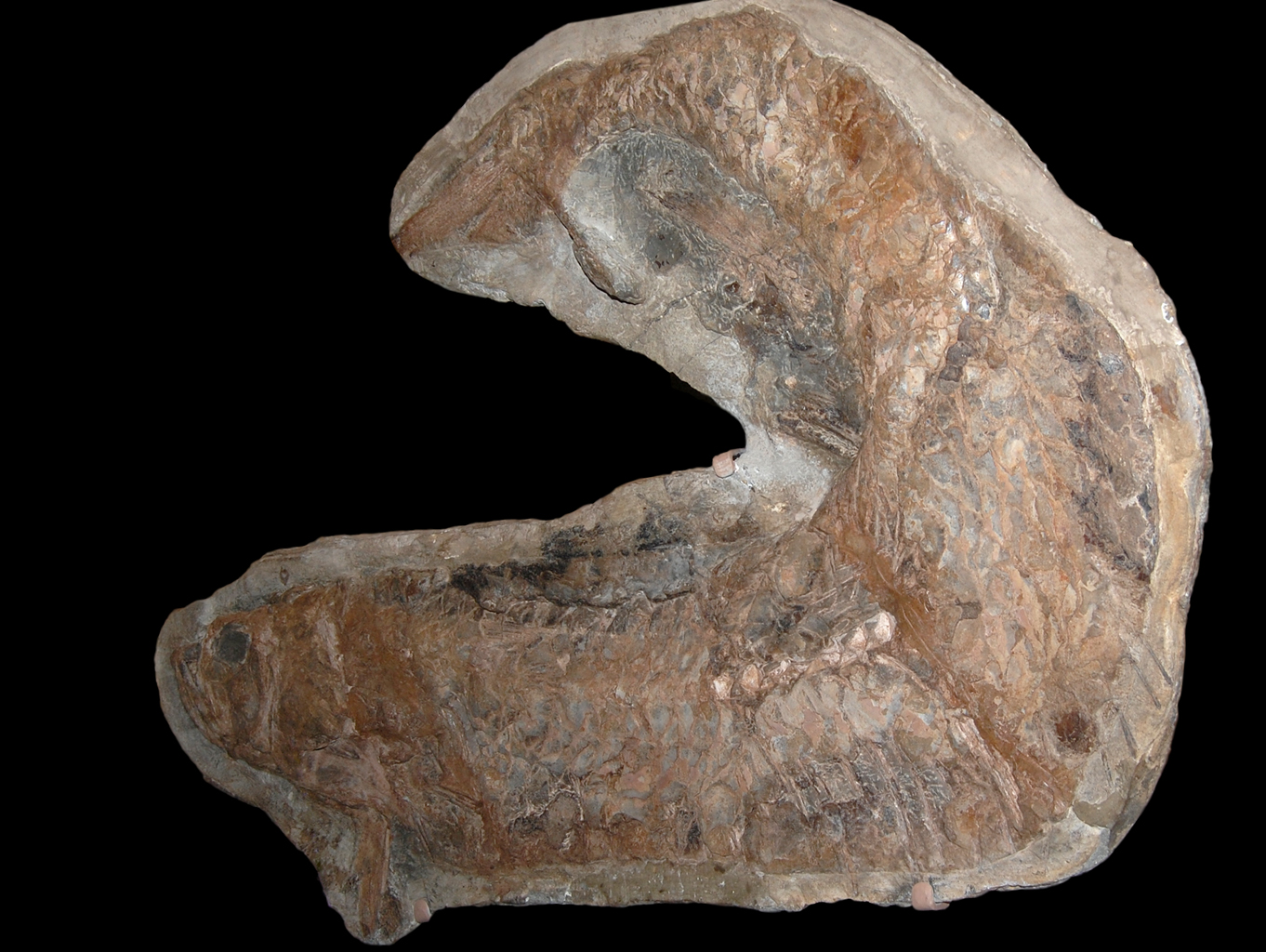
Fossil in Vienna
