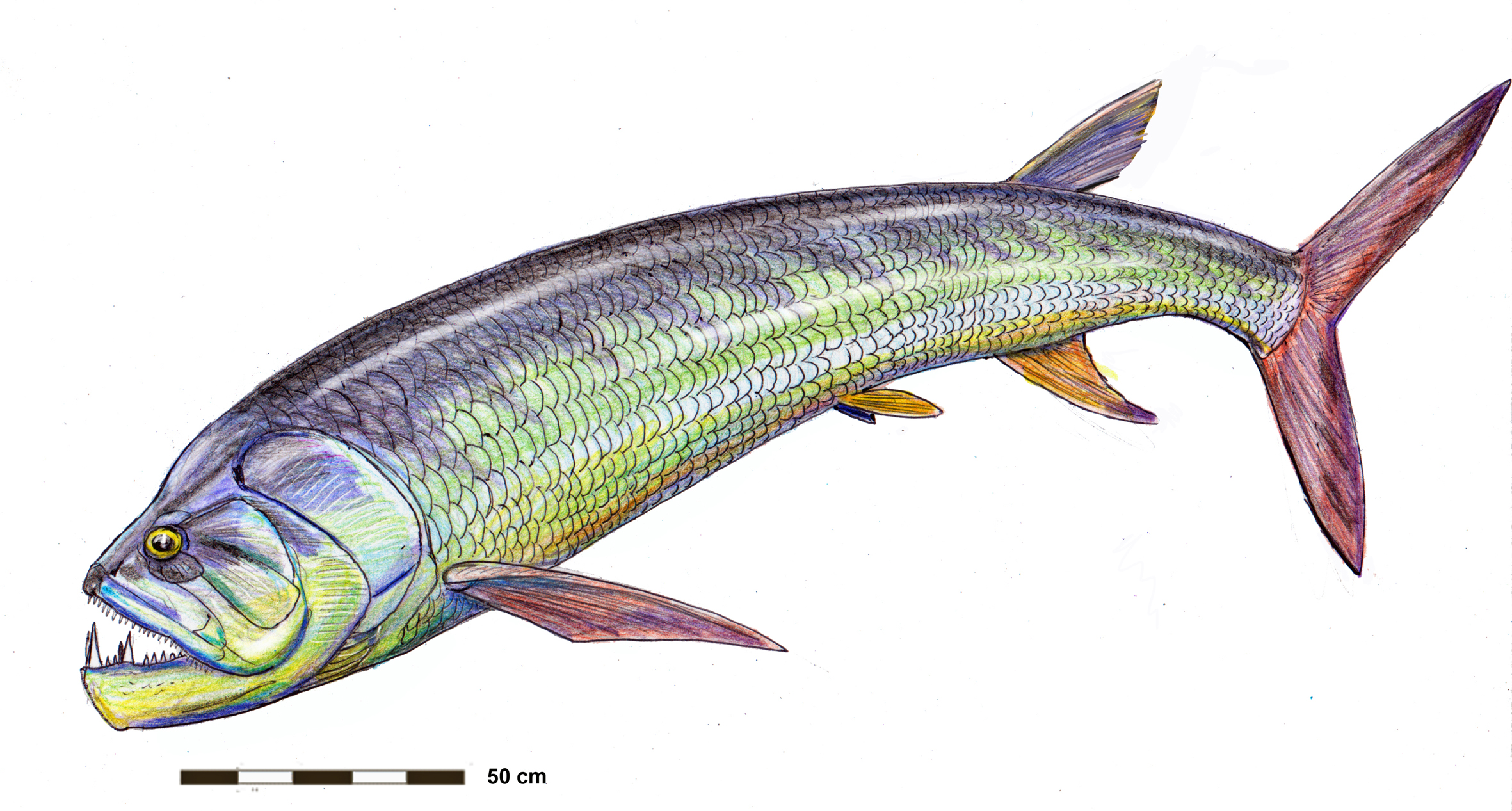
- Life restoration of A. paludalis

Scientific classification
- Kingdom: Animalia
- Phylum: Chordata
- Class: Actinopterygii
- Order: †Ichthyodectiformes
- Family: †Cladocyclidae
- Genus: †Aidachar; Nesov, 1981

Species
- A. paludalis Nesov, 1981 (type); A. pankowskii (Forey et al. 2007)

= Aidachar =

Aidachar Temporal range: Late Cretaceous, Cenomanian–Turonian

Extinct genus of ray-finned fishes

Aidachar (named for Aydahar, a mythical Kazakh dragon) is an extinct genus of freshwater ichthyodectiform ray-finned fish from the Late Cretaceous (Cenomanian-Turonian) of Central Asia and North Africa.

The type species is A. paludalis, named by Lev Alexandrovitch Nesov in 1981 from remains discovered in the Bissekty Formation, in what is now the Kyzyl Kum desert of Uzbekistan. At first, he tentatively described the fossil material as the jaw fragments of a ctenochasmatid pterosaur (a flying reptile), but reinterpreted Aidachar as a fish in 1986. The second species, A. pankowskii, is described from Kem Kem Group of Morocco and reclassified from the genus Cladocyclus, to which it is thought to be closely related.
