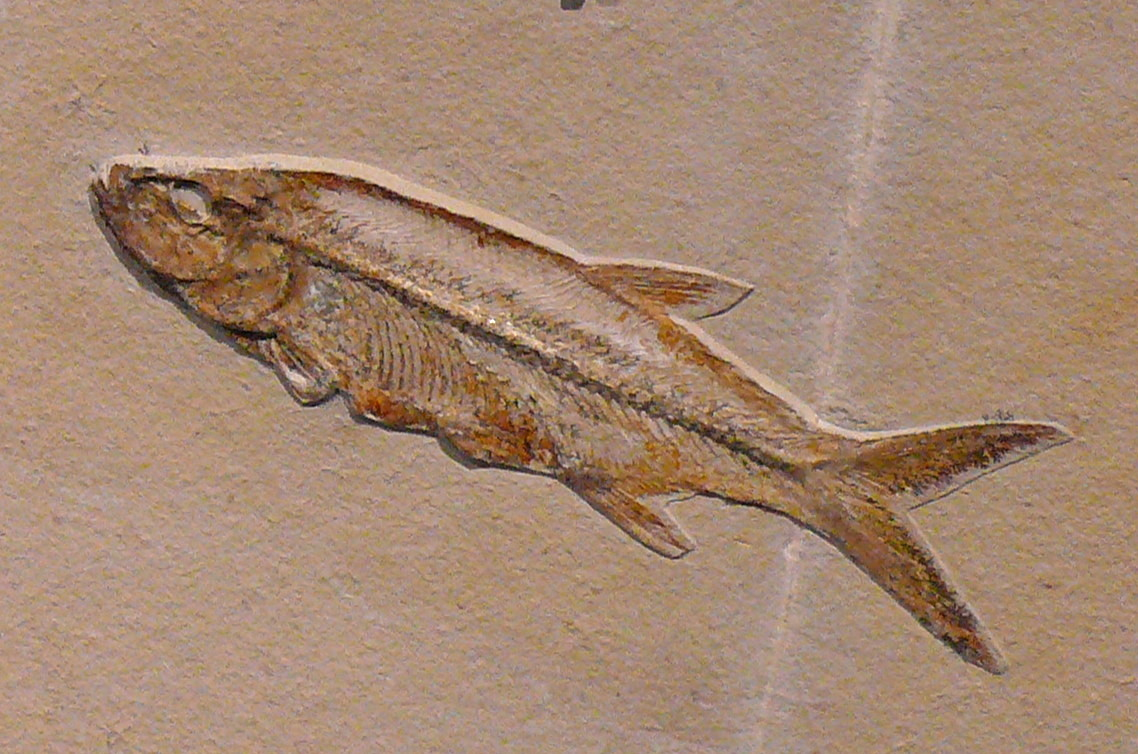
- Fossil of Pachythrissops propterus

Scientific classification
- Domain: Eukaryota
- Kingdom: Animalia
- Phylum: Chordata
- Class: Actinopterygii
- Order: †Ichthyodectiformes (?)
- Genus: †Pachythrissops; Woodward, 1919

Species
- †P. laevis Woodward, 1919 (Type); †P. propterus (Wagner, 1873)

= Pachythrissops =

Pachythrissops Temporal range: Tithonian–Berriasian

Extinct genus of ray-finned fishes

Pachythrissops is an extinct genus of ray-finned fish. It contains two species, P. laevis from the Purbeckian of England and P. propterus from the Tithonian of Germany. A third species, P. vectensis, has been reassigned to the elopiform genus Arratiaelops. Pachythrissops is often regarded as one of the most primitive members of the order Ichthyodectiformes; however, a phylogenetic analysis by Cavin et al. (2013) placed it and the related genus Ascalabothrissops outside the group.

== Sources ==
- Fossils (Smithsonian Handbooks) by David Ward (Page 215)
