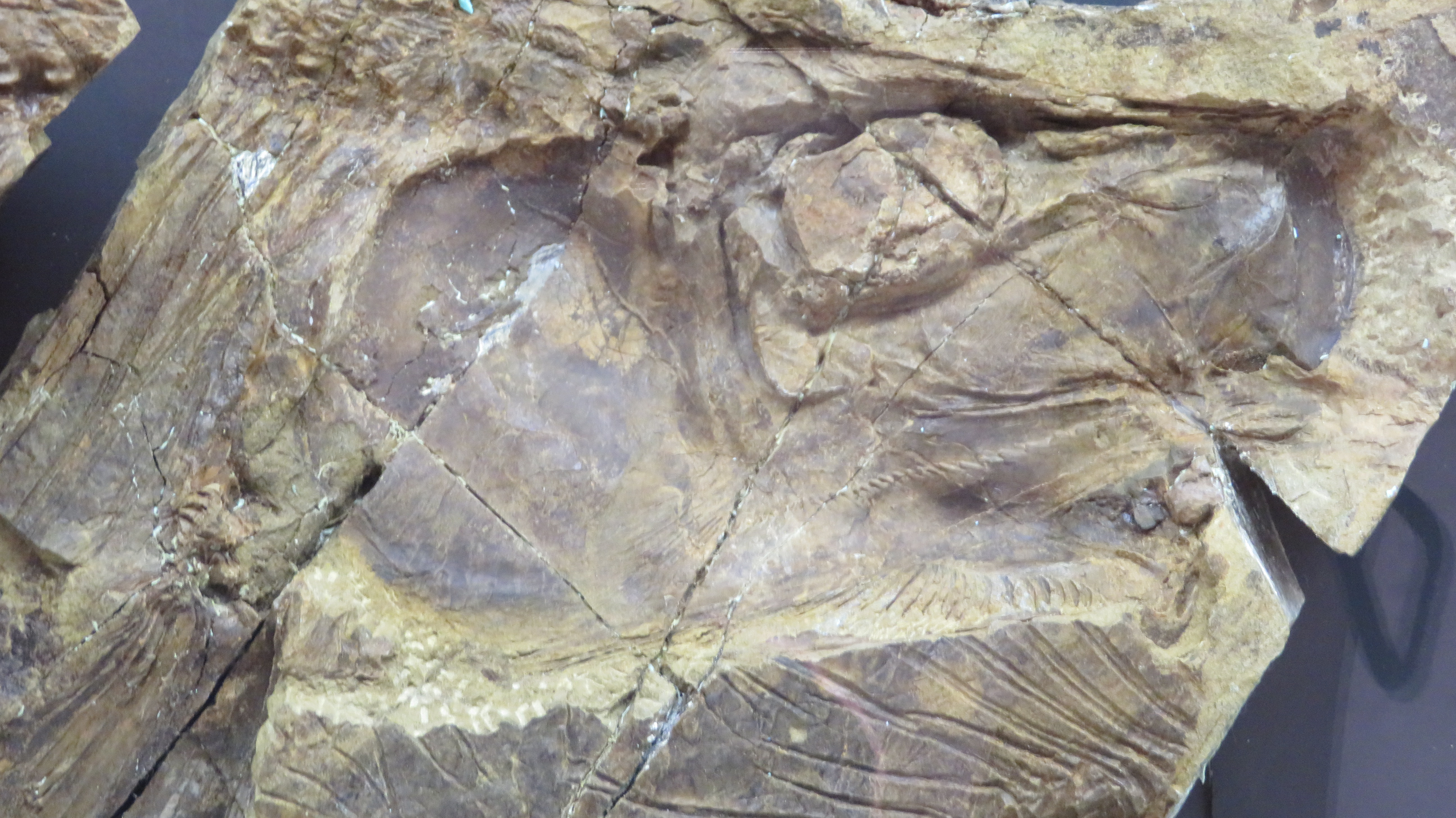
- Skull of A. gosyouraensis
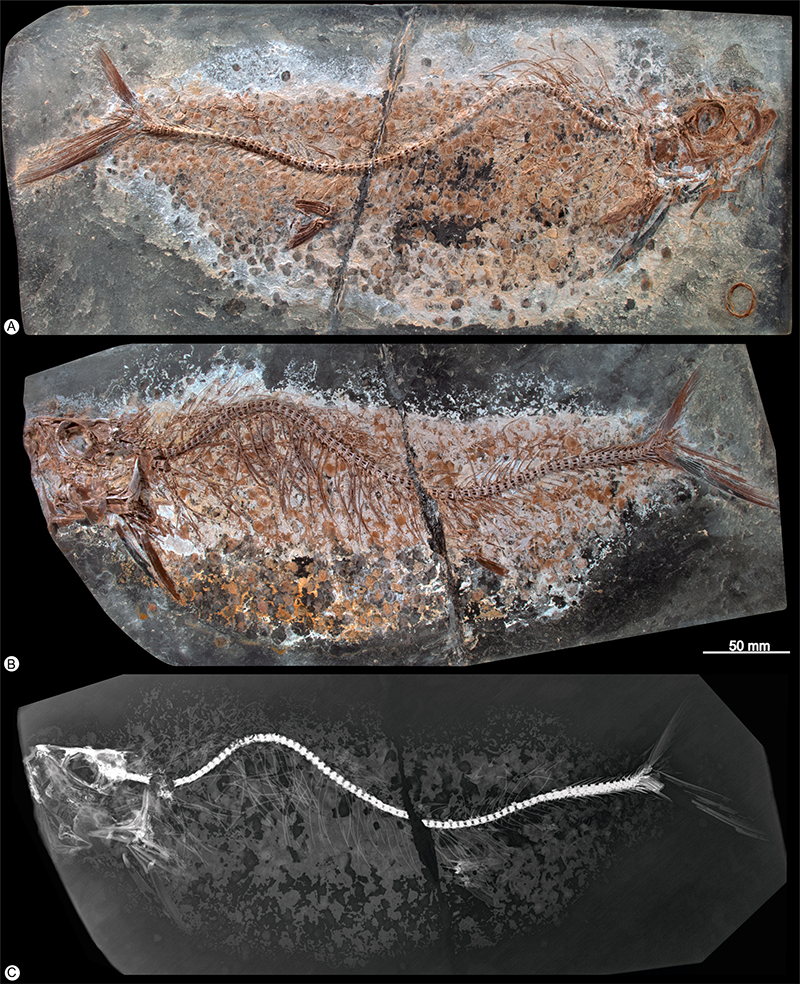
- Type specimen of A. benammii

Scientific classification
- Kingdom: Animalia
- Phylum: Chordata
- Class: Actinopterygii
- Order: †Ichthyodectiformes
- Family: †Heckelichthyidae
- Genus: †Amakusaichthys; Yabumoto et al. 2018

Type species
- †Amakusaichthys goshouraensis Yabumoto et al. 2018

Other species
- †A. benammii Alvarado-Ortega, 2024

= Amakusaichthys =

Amakusaichthys Temporal range: Santonian–Campanian

Extinct genus of ray-finned fishes

Amakusaichthys is an extinct genus of ichthyodectiform ray-finned fish which lived during the Late Cretaceous, known from two species A. goshouraensis from Kumamoto Prefecture in Japan and A. benammii from Chiapas in Mexico.

== Discovery ==
Fossils of A. goshouraensis were discovered in 2012 from construction site in Goshoura, Amakusa. This site is later considered to belong to Hinoshima Formation of the Himenoura Group. It was the first discovery of marine ichthyodectform fish described from Asia in detail, while other ichthyodectiform fish from Asia (three genera belong to Chuhsiungichthyidae) are from non-marine environment.

Second species, A. benammii is described from Angostura Formation in Tzimol Quarry, Chiapas, southeastern Mexico.

== Description ==
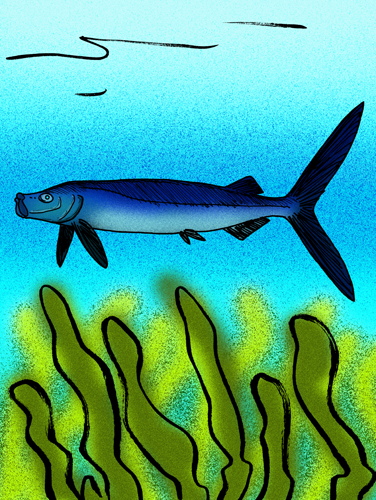
Life restoration of A. goshouraensis

Amakusaichthys is relatively small ichthyodectiform with length around 60 cm (24 in). It is characterized by its long snout and small mouth and teeth. Multiple specimens are found overlapped in one place, suggesting its schooling ecology.

== Classification ==
Amakusaichthys was not assigned to any family in original description. However, characters suggested that it was related to Heckelichthys. In 2021, it was assigned to Bardackichthyidae, alongside Heckelichthys and Bardackichthys. However, a 2024 paper which described a new species A. benammii placed both Amakusaichthys and Heckelichthys (with Garganoichthys and Altamuraichthys as other probable members) into a separate family Heckelichthyidae, and questioned the inclusion of Bardackichthys and Chuhsiungichthyidae within Ichthyodectiformes.
