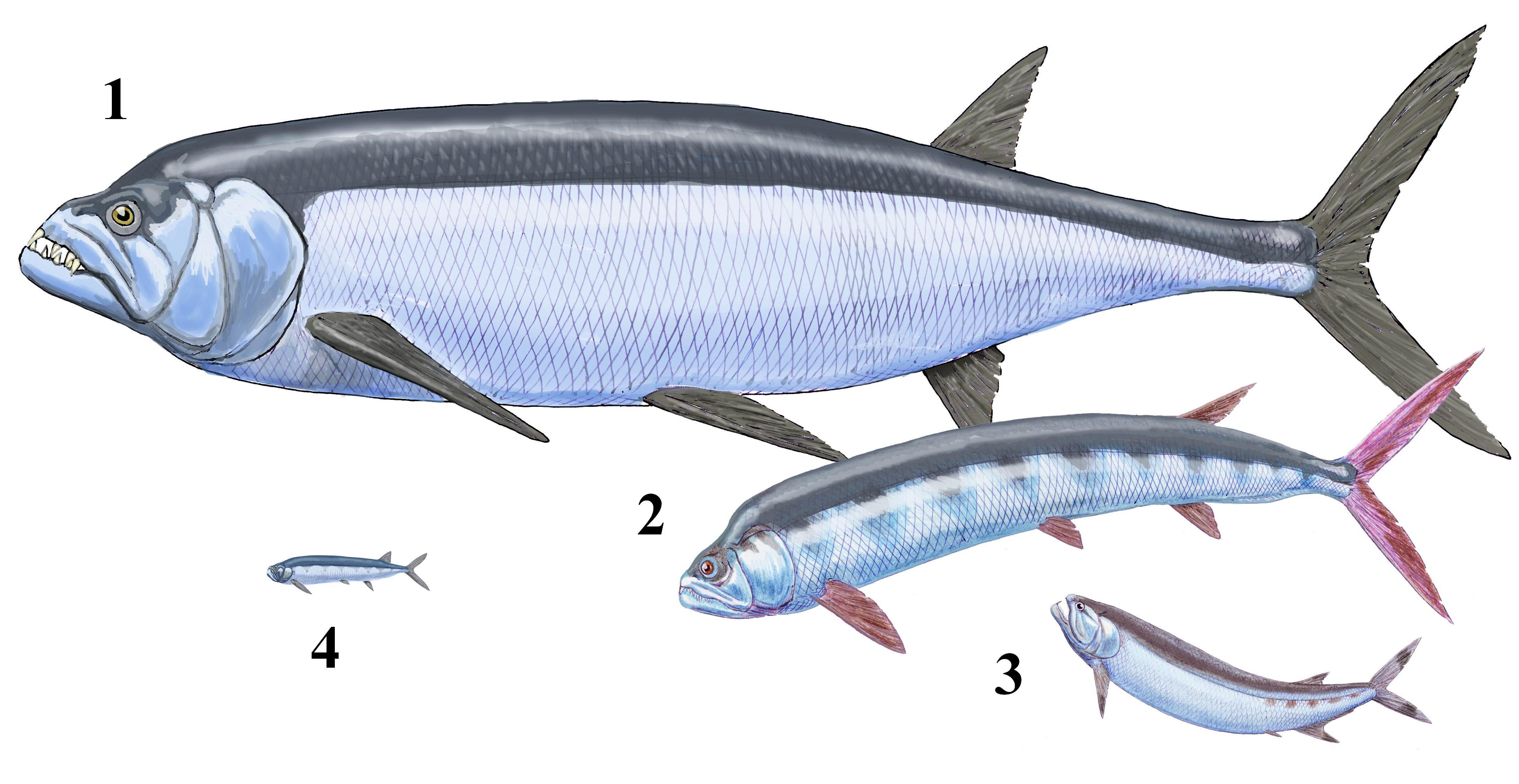
- 1. Xiphactinus audax 2. Ichthyodectes ctenodon 3. Cladocyclus gardneri 4. Chirocentrites sp.
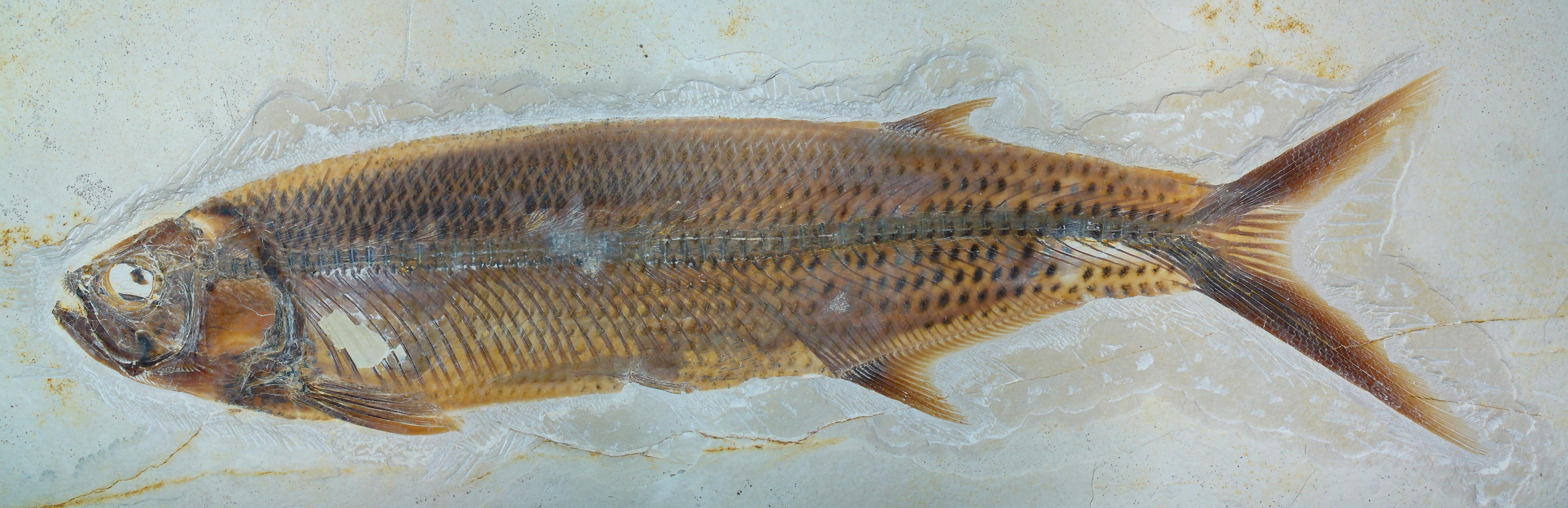
- Fossil of Thrissops

Scientific classification
- Kingdom: Animalia
- Phylum: Chordata
- Class: Actinopterygii
- Division: Teleostei
- Order: †Ichthyodectiformes; Bardack & Sprinkle, 1969

Subgroups
- See text

= Ichthyodectiformes =

Ichthyodectiformes Temporal range: Middle Jurassic-Early Paleocene

Extinct order of ray-finned fishes

Ichthyodectiformes is an extinct order of marine stem-teleost ray-finned fish. The order is named after the genus Ichthyodectes, established by Edward Drinker Cope in 1870. Ichthyodectiforms are usually considered to be some of the closest relatives of the teleost crown group.

They were most diverse throughout the Cretaceous period, though basal forms like Thrissops, Occithrissops and Allothrissops are known from the Middle-Late Jurassic of Europe and North America. They were almost entirely wiped out by the Cretaceous-Paleogene extinction event, but a single species, Saurocephalus lanciformis, appears to have survived into the earliest Paleocene (Danian).

Most ichthyodectiforms ranged between 1 and 5 meters (3.3 and 16.4 ft) in length. Most of known taxa were predators, feeding on smaller fish; in several cases, larger ichthyodectiforms preyed on smaller members of the order. Some species had remarkably large teeth, though others, such as Gillicus arcuatus, had small ones and sucked in their prey. Heckelichthys preopercularis is a rare example of non-predatory ichthyodectiform, more likely to be microphagous, fed on small particles. There is evidence that at least one species, Xiphactinus audax, may have been endothermic ("warm-blooded"). Another genus, Dugaldia, may have been able to laterally open its mouth extremely wide in a manner akin to the modern sarcastic fringehead.

== Systematics ==
The basal phylogeny is badly resolved, leading to many ichthyodectiforms that are simply known to be rather primitive, but where nothing certain can be said about their precise relationships.

†Ichthyodectiformes

- †Africathrissops Taverne, 2010
- †Allothrissops Nybelin, 1964
- †Antarctithrissops Arratia et al., 2004
- †Ascalabothrissops? Arratia, 2000
- †Capassoichthys Taverne, 2015
- †Carsothrissops d'Erasmo, 1946
- †Dugaldia Lees, 1990
- †Faugichthys Taverne & Chanet, 2000
- †Furloichthys Taverne & Capasso, 2018
- †Occithrissops Schaeffer & Patterson, 1984
- †Ogunichthys Alvarado-Ortega & Brito, 2009
- †Pachythrissops? Woodward, 1919
- †Prymnetes Cope, 1871
- †Thrissops Agassiz, 1843
- †Sultanuvaisia Nesov, 1981
- †Unamichthys Alvarado-Ortega, 2004
- †Verraesichthys Taverne, 2010
- †Chuhsiungichthyidae? Yabumoto, 1994
  - †Chuhsiungichthys? Lew, 1974
  - †Jinjuichthys? Kim et al., 2014
  - †Mesoclupea? Ping & Yen, 1933
- †Bardackichthyidae? Hacker & Shimada, 2021
  - †Bardackichthys? Hacker & Shimada, 2021
- †Cladocyclidae Maisey, 1991
  - †Aidachar Nesov, 1981
  - †Chirocentrites Heckel, 1849
  - †Chiromystus Cope, 1885
  - †Cladocyclus Agassiz, 1841
  - †Cladocynodon de Mayrinck et al., 2023
  - †Eubiodectes Hay, 1903
- †Ichthyodectidae Crook, 1892
  - †Cooyoo Bartholomai & Less, 1987
  - †Ghrisichthys Cavin et al., 2013
  - †Ichthyodectes Cope, 1870
  - †Postredectes Kaddumi, 2009
  - †Xiphactinus Leidy, 1870
- †Heckelichthyidae Alvarado-Ortega, 2024
  - †Altamuraichthys? Taverne, 2016
  - †Amakusaichthys Yabumoto et al., 2020
  - †Garganoichthys? Taverne, 2009
  - †Heckelichthys Taverne, 2008
- †Saurodontidae Cope, 1870
  - †Gillicus Cope, 1875
  - †Gwawinapterus Arbour & Currie, 2011
  - †Prosaurodon Stewart, 1999
  - †Saurocephalus Harlan, 1824
  - †Saurodon Hay, 1830
  - †Vallecillichthys Blanco & Cavin, 2003
  - †Wadiichthys Abu El-Kheir, 2026
