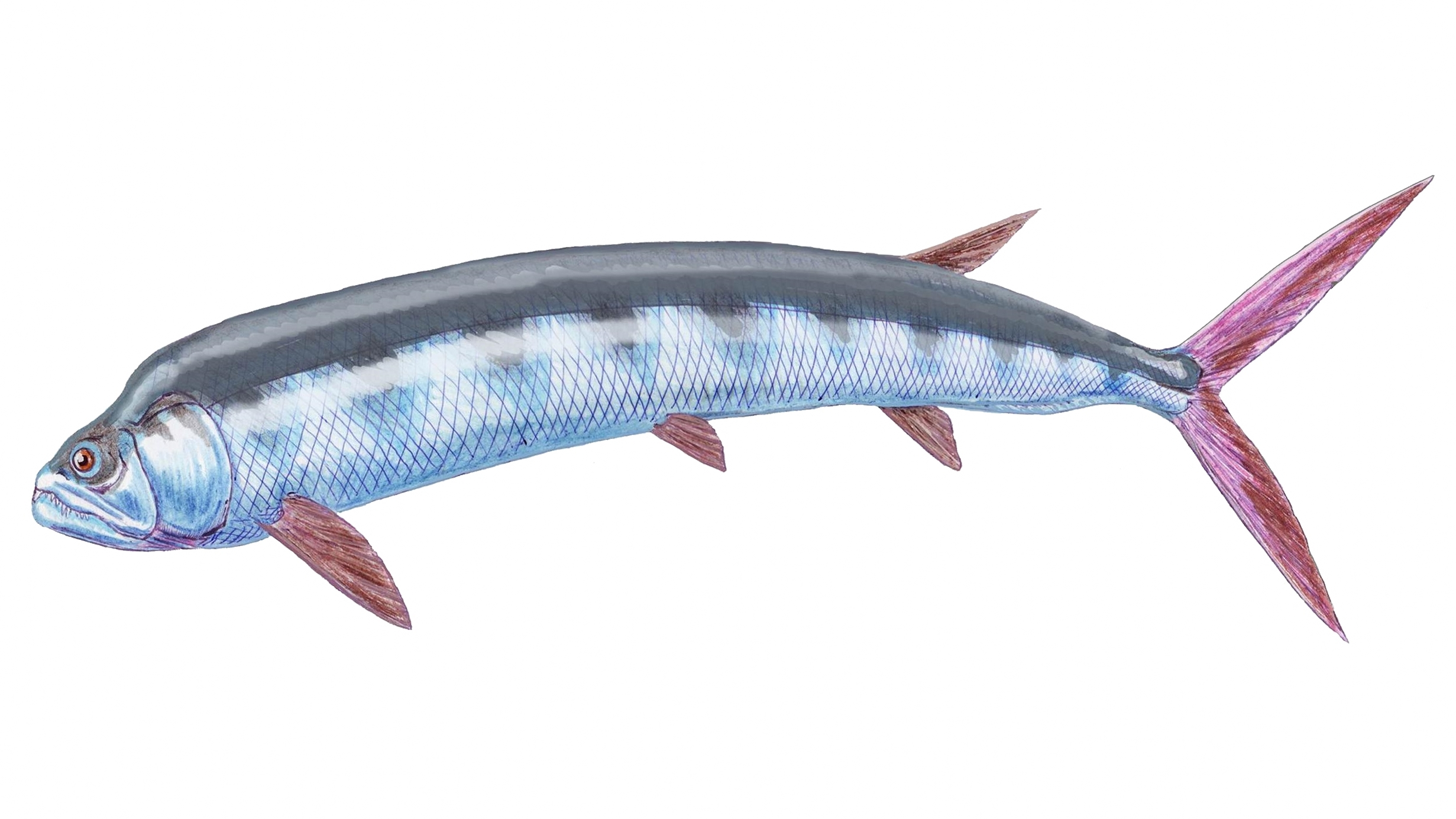
- Life restoration of I. ctenodon
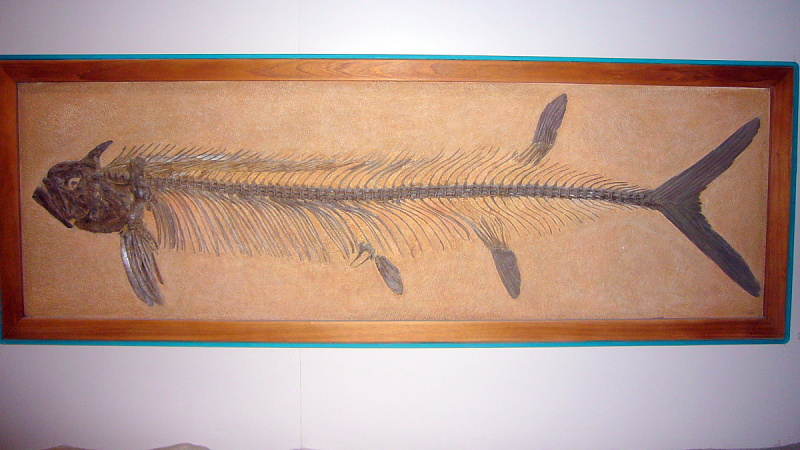
- Skeleton of I. ctenodon

Scientific classification
- Kingdom: Animalia
- Phylum: Chordata
- Class: Actinopterygii
- Stem group: Teleostei
- Order: †Ichthyodectiformes
- Family: †Ichthyodectidae
- Subfamily: †Ichthyodectinae
- Genus: †Ichthyodectes; Cope, 1870

Species
- See text

= Ichthyodectes =

Ichthyodectes Temporal range: Late Cretaceous (Cenomanian to Campanian)

Extinct genus of ray-finned fishes

Ichthyodectes is an extinct genus of marine ichthyodectid ray-finned fish known from the Late Cretaceous of North America & Europe.

== Taxonomy ==
The following definitive species are known:

- I. ctenodon Cope, 1870 - Cenomanian of Saskatchewan, Canada (Ashville Formation), Turonian of Northwest Territories (Lac des Bois) & Alberta (Kaskapau Formation), Canada and Kansas & South Dakota, US (Carlile Shale & Niobrara Formation), Coniacian to mid-Campanian of Manitoba, Canada (Pierre Shale Formation), and late Santonian/early Campanian of Alabama, US (Mooreville Chalk). All other Ichthyodectes species from the Niobrara Formation are now considered synonymous with I. ctenodon.
- I. tenuidens Woodward, 1901 - Cenomanian of England (English Chalk)

Another small indeterminate Ichthyodectes, previously assigned to the nomen dubium species I. minor (Egerton, 1850) is known from the Cenomanian to the Turonian of the English Chalk.

Although a number of species have previously been placed in the genus, more recent analyses indicate that only two species can confidently be placed in the genus, with the rest being synonymous with this species or belonging to different genera.

== Biology ==
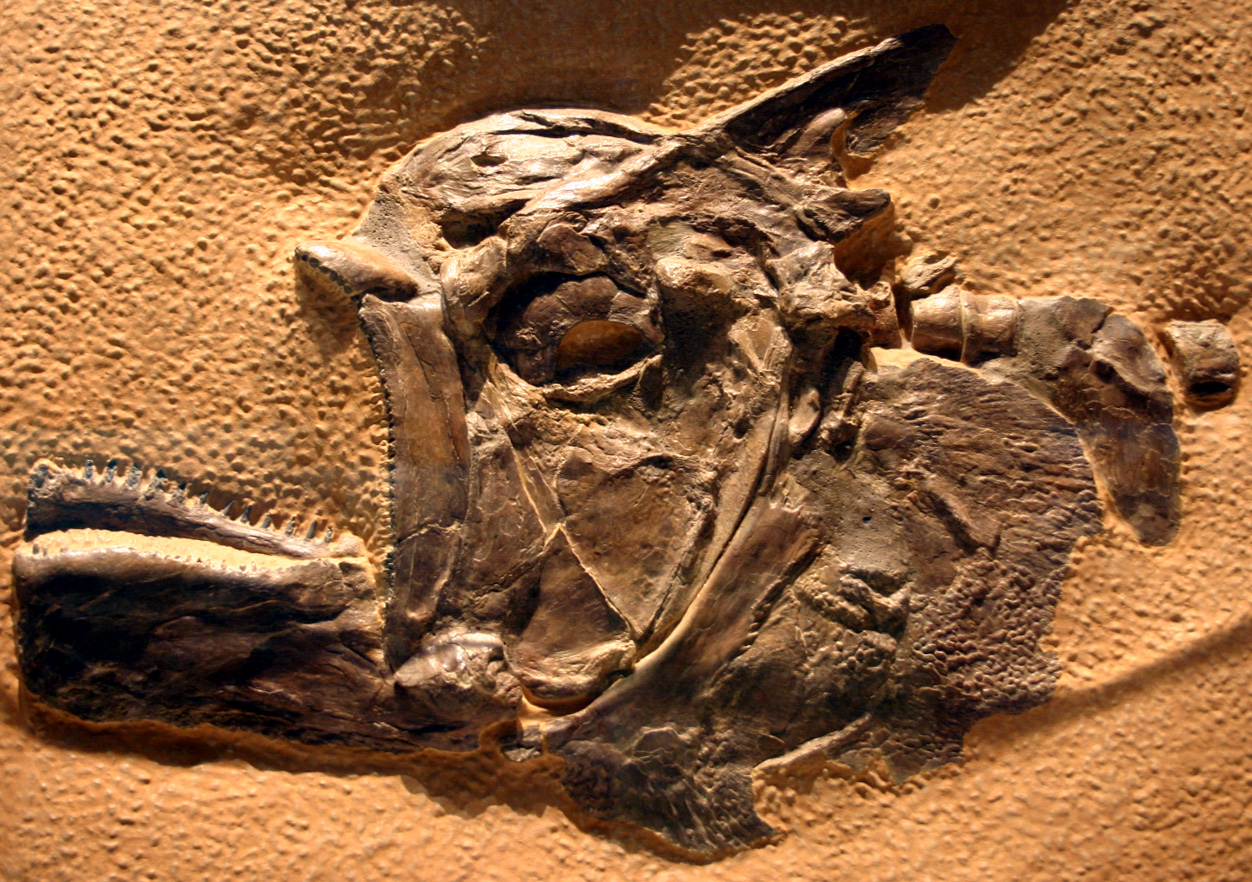
Skull of I. ctenodon

Ichthyodectes ctenodon ("fish biter with comb teeth") was an ichthyodectid over 3 m (9.8 ft) in length. It lived in the Western Interior Seaway of North America during the late Cretaceous. It was closely related to the 4–6 m (13–20 ft) long Xiphactinus audax, and the 2 m (6 ft 7 in) long Gillicus arcuatus, and like other ichthyodectids, I. ctenodon is presumed to have been a swift predator of smaller fish. As its species name suggests, I. ctenodon had small, uniformly sized teeth, as did its smaller relative, G. arcuatus, and may have simply sucked suitably sized prey into its mouth.

A notable specimen of I. ctenodon was collected by Charles H. Sternberg from the Smoky Hill Chalk prior to 1919 and officially described in 2010. This specimen comprises a complete individual with the skeleton of a smaller fish, most likely an Enchodus petrosus, within its stomach. This specimen is reminiscent of the famous "fish-within-a-fish" Xiphactinus specimen, and confirms that Ichthyodectes had a piscivorous diet.
