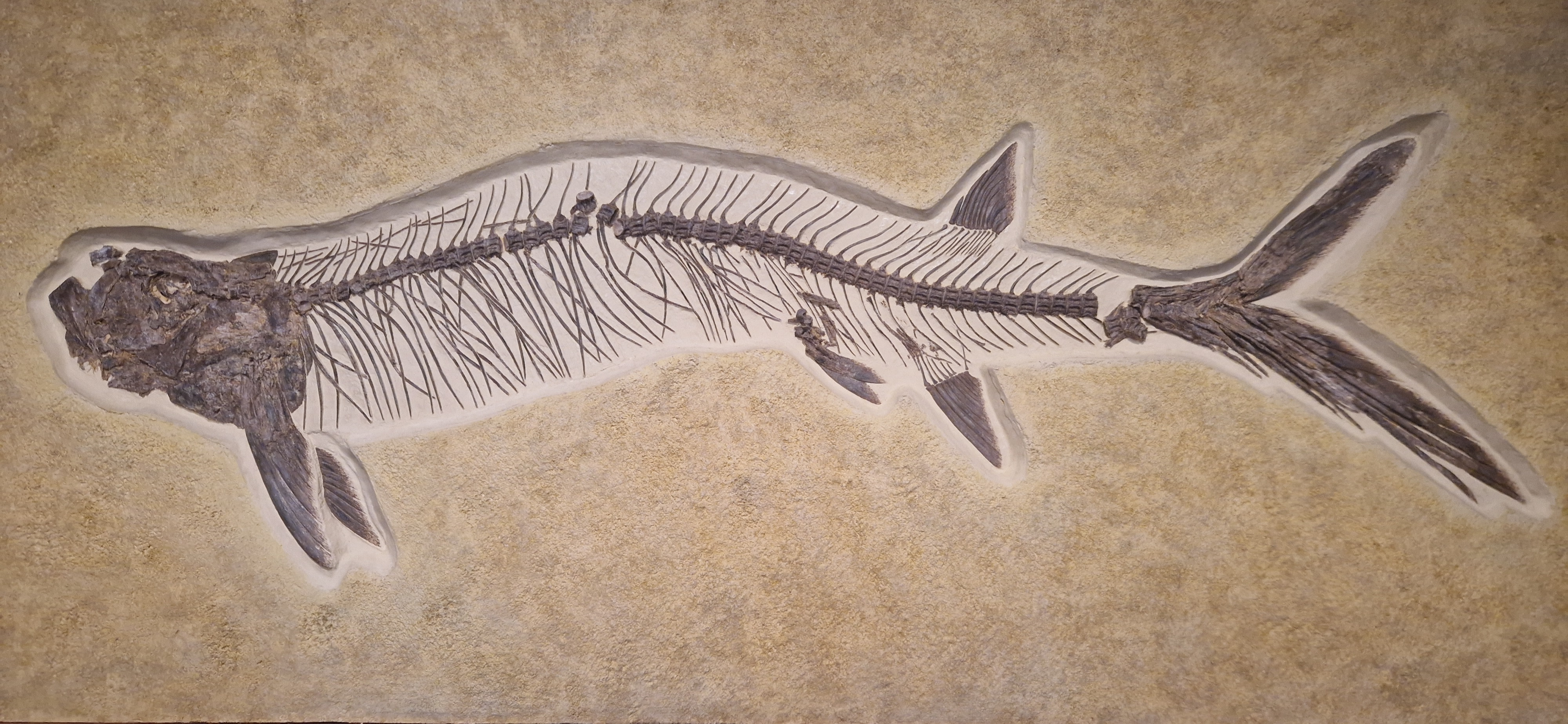
- Fossil
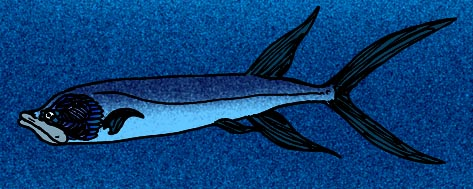
- Life restoration of G. arcuatus

Scientific classification
- Kingdom: Animalia
- Phylum: Chordata
- Class: Actinopterygii
- Division: Teleostei
- Order: †Ichthyodectiformes
- Family: †Saurodontidae
- Genus: †Gillicus; Hay, 1898

Species
- †G. arcuatus (Cope, 1875) (type); †G. serridens (Woodward, 1901)

= Gillicus =

Gillicus Temporal range: Albian to early Maastrichtian

Extinct genus of ray-finned fishes

Gillicus was a marine ichthyodectiform ray-finned fish that lived in the Western Interior Seaway of central North America, in Europe and in East Asia, from the late Albian to the early Maastrichtian. It was approximately 2 metres (6.6 feet) long.

== Taxonomy ==
The genus is named after American ichthyologist Theodore Gill. It contains two known species:

- †G. arcuatus (Cope, 1875) – Turonian to Santonian of Kansas (Niobrara Formation), South Dakota (Benton Shale), and Utah (Tropic Shale), US, Turonian of Coahuila, Mexico, Coniacian of Manitoba, Canada (Carlile Formation)
- †G. serridens (Woodward, 1901) – Albian of England (Gault Formation)

An indeterminate Gillicus species is known from a nearly complete skeleton recovered from the Early Maastrichtian of the Izumi Group, Japan, representing one of the latest records of the genus. A partial ichthyodectiform skull reminiscent of either Gillicus or Chiromystus was recovered from earliest Cenomanian-aged rocks in a drill core taken from the Cape Verde Rise in the southern Atlantic Ocean, about 699.9 metres (2,296 ft) below the surface.

== Description ==
Like its larger relative, Ichthyodectes ctenodon, Gillicus had numerous small teeth lining its jaws, and ate smaller fish by sucking them into its mouth, but the teeth of Gillicus are so small that the jaws appear almost toothless at first, which has led to the suggestion that Gillicus was also a filter-feeder.

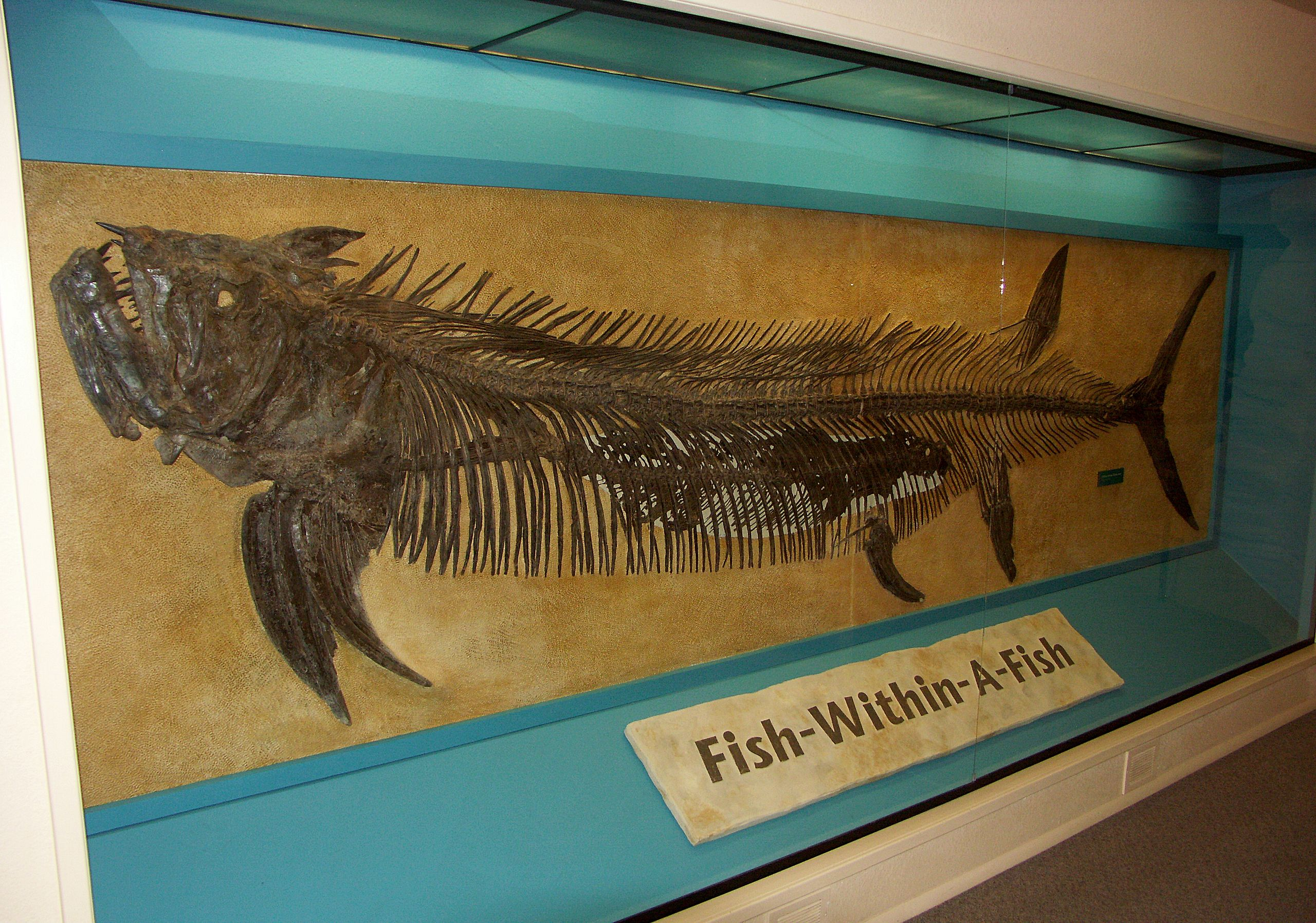
Gillicus arcuatus within the stomach of Xiphactinus audax, George F. Sternberg's most famous fossil find

Gillicus was also eaten by its own relative, Xiphactinus. One particular 13 foot (4.0 m) long fossil specimen contains a nearly perfectly preserved 6 foot (1.8 m) long Gillicus arcuatus inside its ribcage. The Gillicus bones have not been digested so the larger fish must have died soon after eating its prey. The cause of death may have been due to injuries, such as a ruptured major blood vessel, caused by the fin of the smaller fish as it struggled while being swallowed. This fossil specimen, FHSM VP-333 (the Xiphactinus) and FHSM VP-333 (the Gillicus inside) is known as the "fish-in-a-fish" specimen and was collected by George F. Sternberg in 1952. The specimen can be seen at the Sternberg Museum of Natural History in Hays, Kansas. Gillicus remains are also present in at least two other Xiphactinus specimens.

Nearly all of the Gillicus specimens collected from the Smoky Hill Chalk are adults or subadults, which suggests that the early stages of their life were spent elsewhere.

In 2009, the first specimen of Gillicus from Mexico was described.

In 2021, the children's book The Plesiosaur's Neck coined the common name "pug fish" for the Gillicus.
