= Mesoclupea =

Mesoclupea Temporal range: Early Cretaceous

Scientific classification
- Domain: Eukaryota
- Kingdom: Animalia
- Phylum: Chordata
- Class: Actinopterygii
- Order: †Ichthyodectiformes (?)
- Family: †Chuhsiungichthyidae
- Genus: †Mesoclupea; Ping & Yen, 1933
- Species: †M. showchangensis

Binomial name
- †Mesoclupea showchangensis Ping & Yen, 1933

Extinct genus of ray-finned fishes

Mesoclupea showchangensis is an extinct ichthyodectiform ray-finned fish that lived in freshwater environments in what is now China during the Early Cretaceous epoch. It differs from its sister genus, Chuhsiungichthys, primarily by having a more posteriorly-placed dorsal fin.
