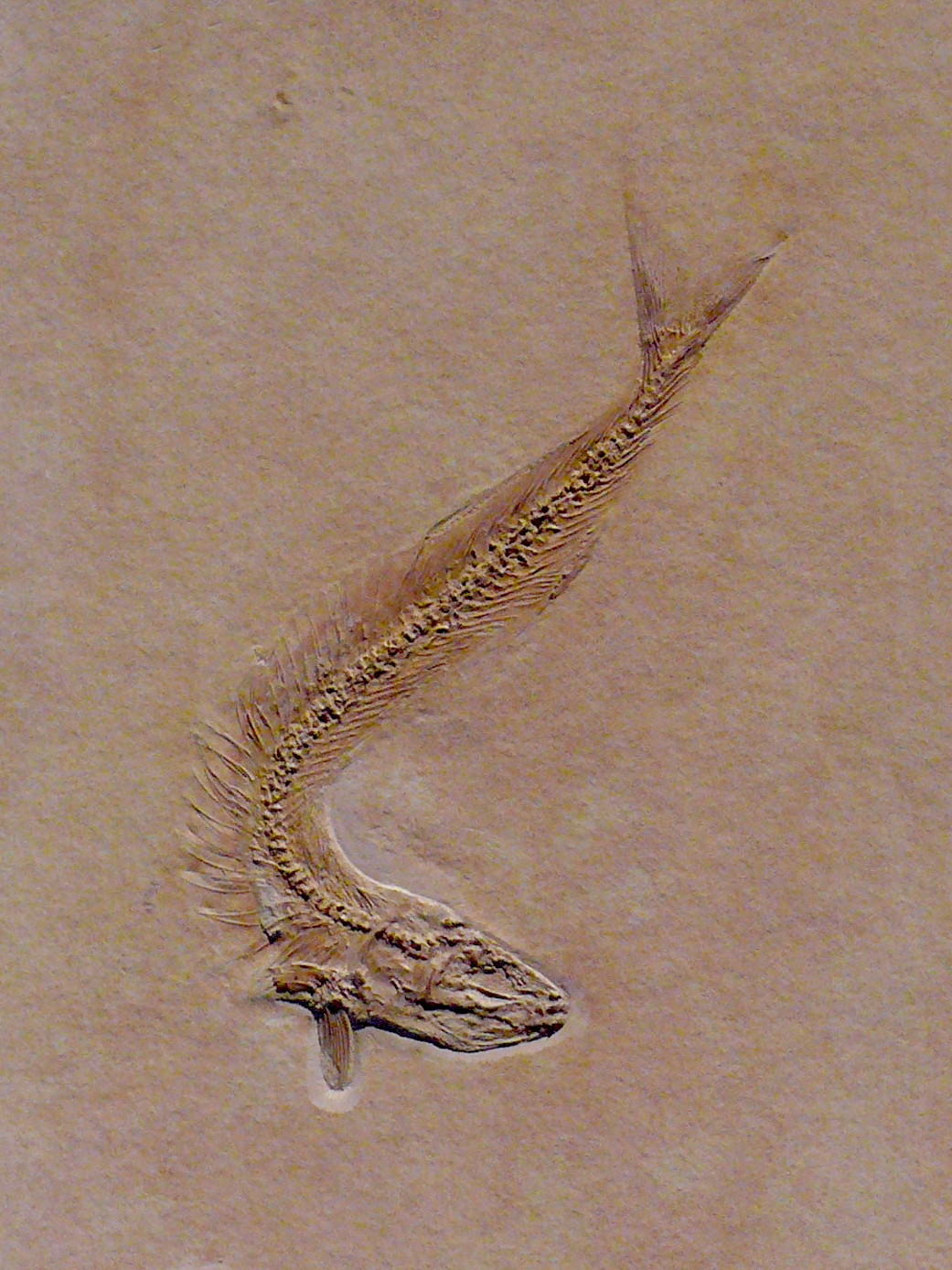

Scientific classification
- Kingdom: Animalia
- Phylum: Chordata
- Class: Actinopterygii
- Order: †Ichthyodectiformes
- Genus: †Allothrissops dNybelin, 1964

Species
- See text

= Allothrissops =

Allothrissops Temporal range: Kimmeridgian

Extinct genus of ray-finned fishes

Allothrissops is an extinct genus of marine ray-finned fish in the order Ichthyodectiformes, or bulldog fish. It is known from the Late Jurassic of Germany, where it has been found in the famous Solnhofen Limestone.

The following species are known:

- A. mesogaster (Agassiz, 1834)
- A. salmoneus (de Blainville, 1818)
- A. regleyi (Thiollière, 1854)

Formerly placed with several other genera in the family Allothrissopidae, more recent studies have found this placement to be paraphyletic, and it is now placed as a basal ichthyodectiform.
