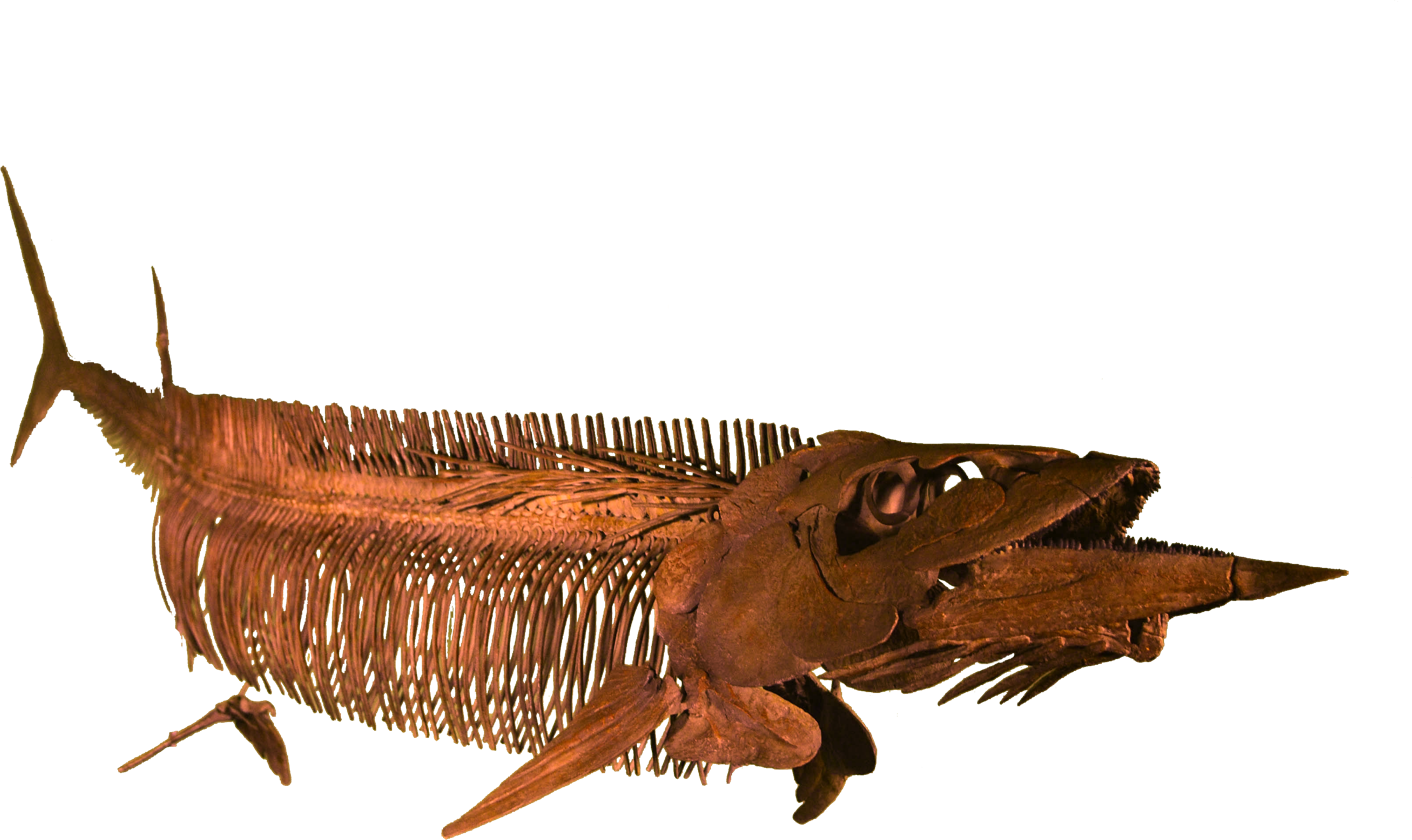
- Reconstructed S. leanus skeleton, Rocky Mountain Dinosaur Resource Center, Woodland Park, Colorado

Scientific classification
- Kingdom: Animalia
- Phylum: Chordata
- Class: Actinopterygii
- Order: †Ichthyodectiformes
- Family: †Saurodontidae
- Genus: †Saurodon; Hays, 1830

= Saurodon =

Saurodon Temporal range: Santonian to early Maastrichtian Possible late Maastrichtian records

Extinct genus of ray-finned fishes

Saurodon (from Greek: σαῦρος saûros, 'lizard' and Greek: ὀδούς odoús 'tooth') is an extinct genus of ichthyodectiform ray-finned fish from the Late Cretaceous.

Saurodon leanus is known to occur as early as the Santonian to the early Campanian. It was a large, predatory fish, with a length of more than 2.5 m (8 ft 2 in). S. elongatus from the late Campanian or early Maastrichtian of Calcari di Melissano, Italy had length only around 90 cm (35 in). Potentially the last record of Saurodon is from the late Maastrichtian of the Muwaqqar Chalk-Marl Formation of Jordan.

== Species ==
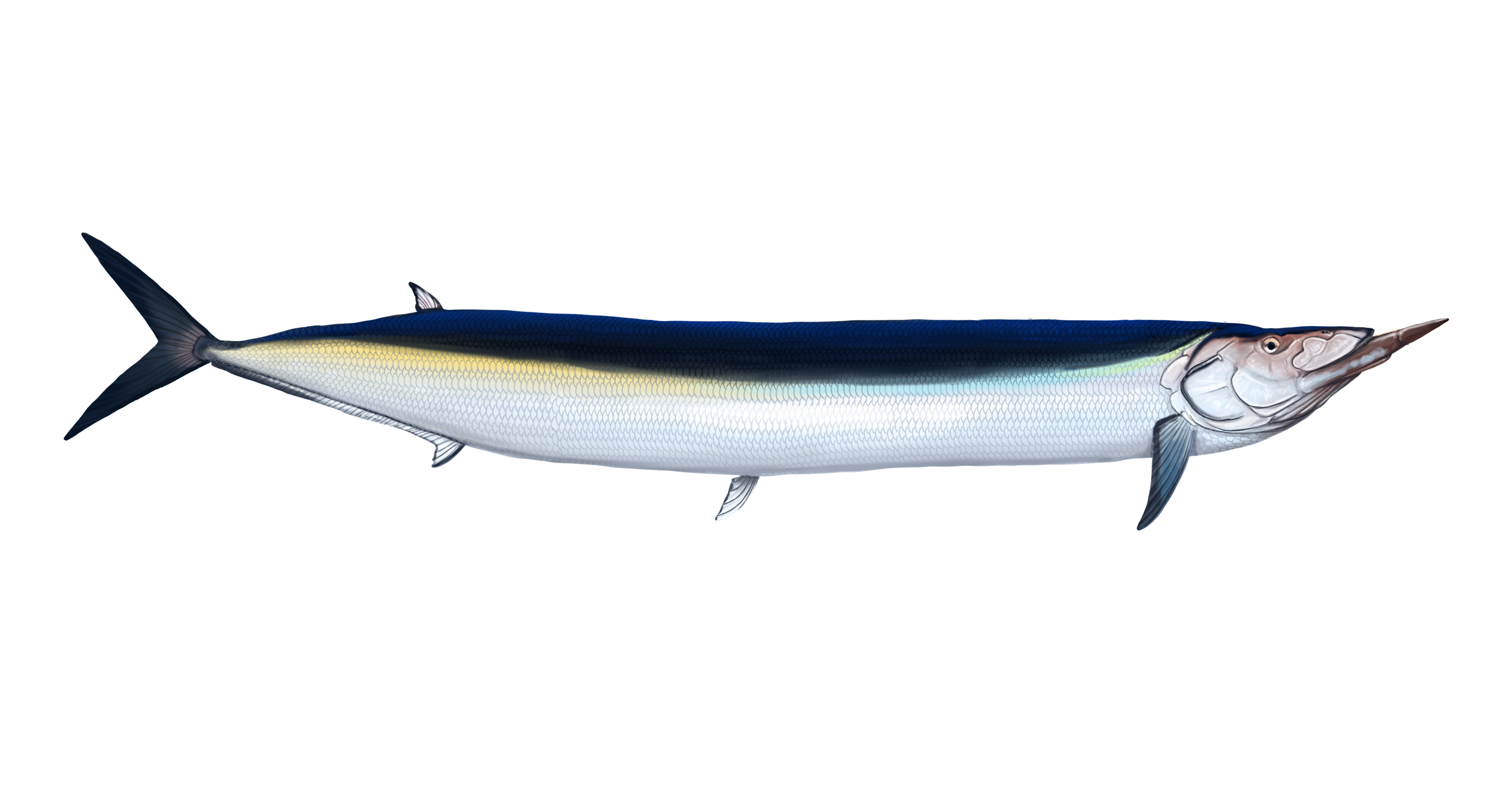
S. leanus

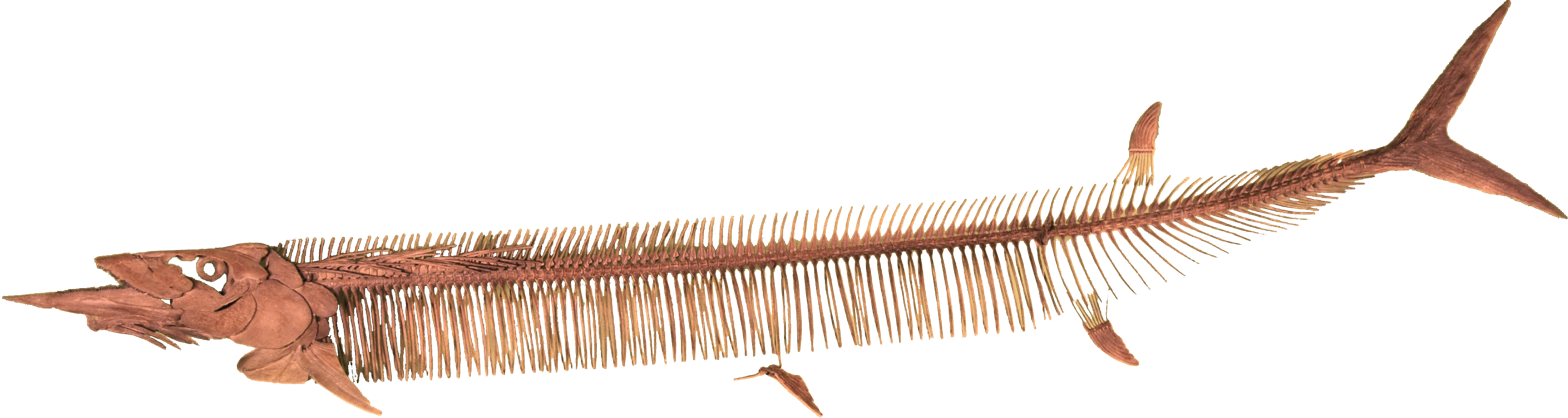
Saurodon leanus left lateral view of 3D reconstruction in the Rocky Mountain Dinosaur Resource Center

- Saurodon elongatus Taverne & Bronzi, 1999
- 'Saurodon' intermedius Newton, 1878
- Saurodon leanus Hays, 1830

== Sources ==
- Fishes of the World by Joseph S. Nelson
