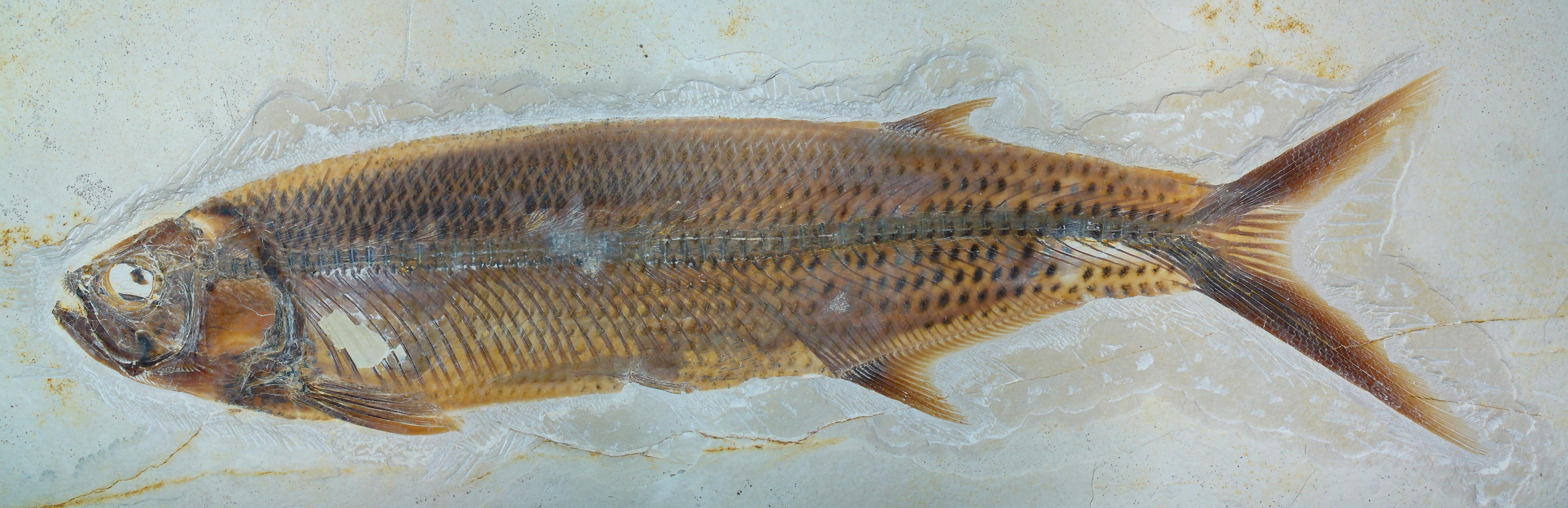
- Thrissops formosus

Scientific classification
- Kingdom: Animalia
- Phylum: Chordata
- Class: Actinopterygii
- Division: Teleostei
- Order: †Ichthyodectiformes
- Genus: †Thrissops; Agassiz, 1833

= Thrissops =

Thrissops Temporal range: Kimmeridgian–Tithonian

Extinct genus of ray-finned fishes

Thrissops (from Greek: θρῐ́ξ thrix, 'hair' and Greek: ὄψις ópsis 'look') is an extinct genus of stem-teleost fish from the Jurassic period (Kimmeridgian to Tithonian). Its fossils are known from the Solnhofen Limestone, as well as the Kimmeridge Clay.

Thrissops was a fast predatory fish up to 90 centimetres (35 in) long, that fed on other bony fish. It had a streamlined body with a deeply cleft tail and only very small pelvic fins. Thrissops was one of the smaller members of the order Ichthyodectiformes, which also included larger representatives like Xiphactinus and Saurodon.
