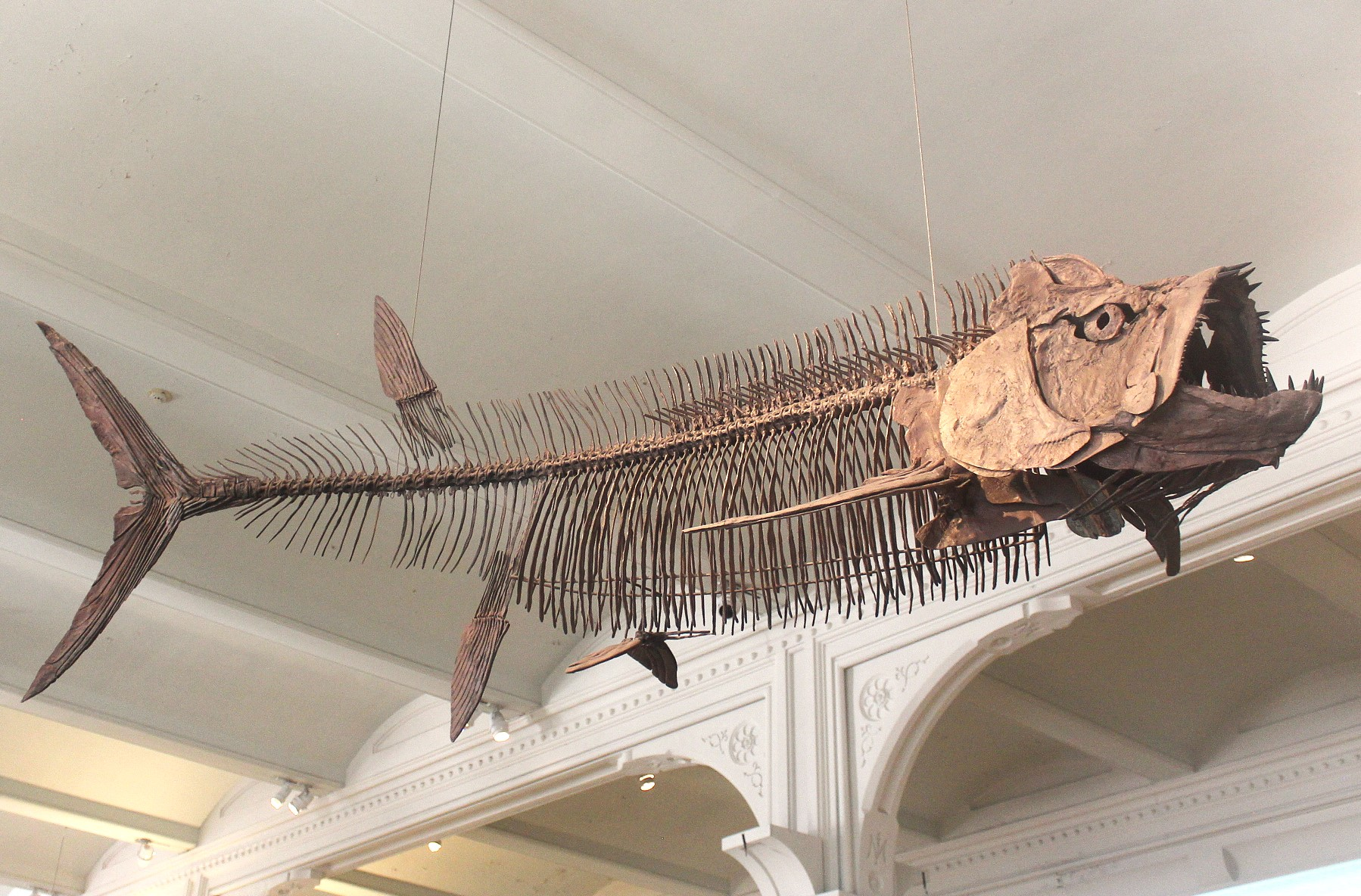
- Mounted skeleton of X. audax at the American Museum of Natural History

Scientific classification
- Kingdom: Animalia
- Phylum: Chordata
- Class: Actinopterygii
- Division: Teleostei
- Order: †Ichthyodectiformes
- Family: †Ichthyodectidae
- Subfamily: †Ichthyodectinae
- Genus: †Xiphactinus; Leidy, 1870

Type species
- †Xiphactinus audax Leidy, 1870

Other species
- † X. vetus (Leidy, 1856)

Synonyms
- List of synonyms: Synonyms of X. audax; Megalodon sauroides Agassiz, 1835; Megalodon? lewesiensis Mantell, 1836; Hypsodon Agassiz, 1837; Hypsodon lewesiensis Agassiz, 1843; Saurocephalus audax Cope, 1870; Saurocephalus thaumas Cope, 1870; Portheus molossus Cope, 1871; Portheus thaumas Cope, 1871; Portheus lestrio Cope, 1873; Portheus mudgei Cope, 1874; Portheus mantelli Newton, 1877; Portheus daviesi Newton, 1877; Xiphactinus gaultinus Newton, 1877; Xiphactinus mantelli Newton, 1877; Portheus lowii Stewart, 1898; Xiphactinus molossus Stewart, 1898; Xiphactinus thaumas Stewart, 1898; Xiphactinus brachygnathus Stewart, 1899; Xiphactinus lowii Stewart, 1900; Hypsodon(?) granulosus Cockerell, 1919; Hypsodon(?) radiatulus Cockerell, 1919 Synonyms of X. vetus; Polygonodon vetus Leidy, 1856; Polygonodon rectus Emmons, 1858; Mossasaurus rectus Emmons, 1858 (Note: sic); Portheus angulatus Cope, 1872; Xiphactinus angulatus Schwimmer et al., 1992

= Xiphactinus =

Xiphactinus Temporal range: Albian–Maastrichtian 100.5–66 Ma

Extinct genus of ray-finned fishes

Xiphactinus (from Latin and Greek for "sword-ray") is an extinct genus of large predatory marine ray-finned fish that lived during the late Albian to the late Maastrichtian. The genus grew up to 5–6 metres (16–20 ft) in length, and superficially resembled a gargantuan, fanged tarpon. It is a member of the extinct order Ichthyodectiformes, which represent close relatives of modern teleosts.

The species Portheus molossus described by Cope is a junior synonym of X. audax. Skeletal remains of Xiphactinus have come from the Carlile Shale and Greenhorn Limestone of Kansas (where the first Xiphactinus fossil was discovered during the 1850s in the Niobrara Chalk), and Cretaceous formations all over the East Coast (most notably Georgia, Alabama, North Carolina, and New Jersey) in the United States, as well as Europe, Australia, the Kanguk and Ashville Formations of Canada, La Luna Formation of Venezuela and the Salamanca Formation in Argentina.

== Paleobiology ==
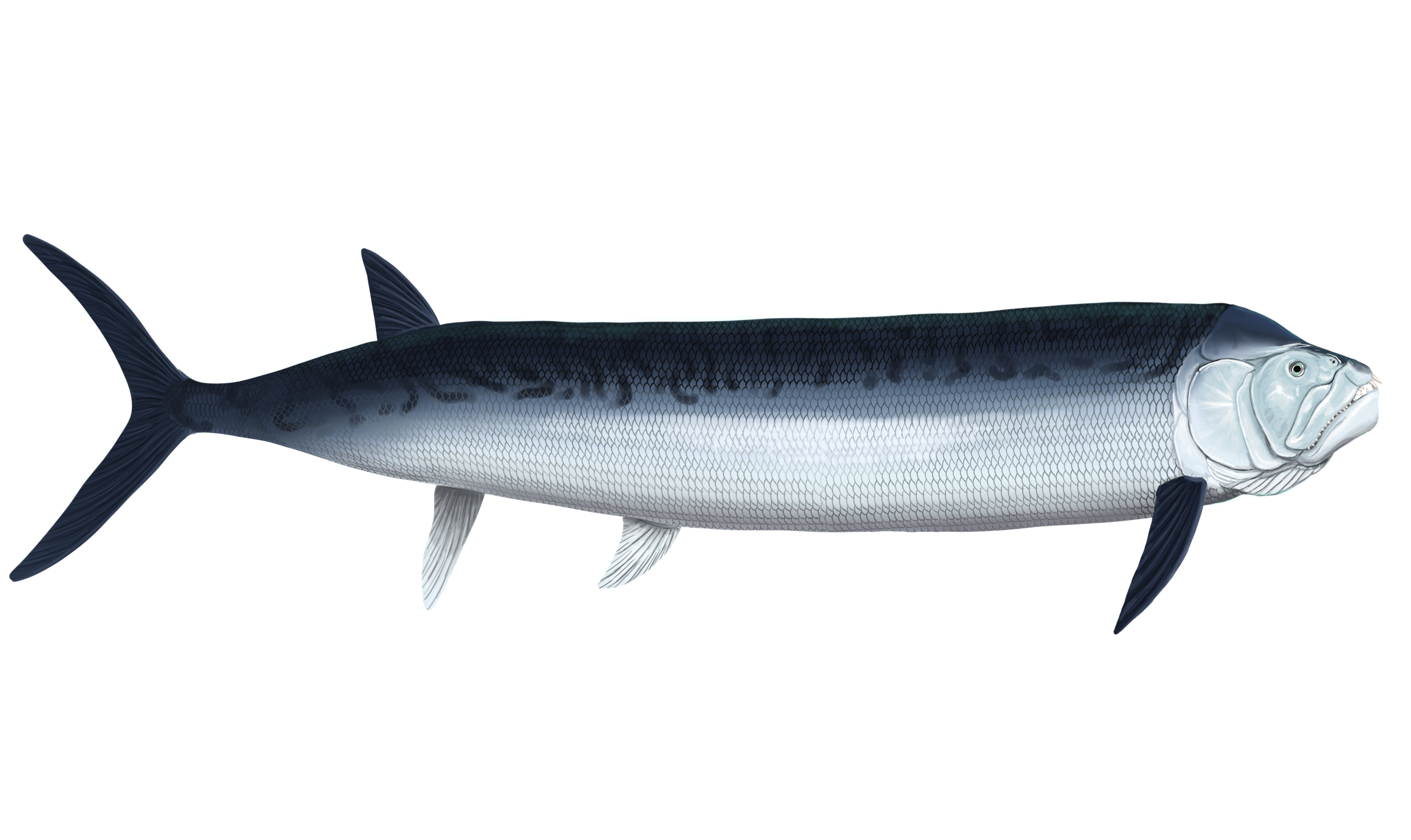
Restoration of X. audax

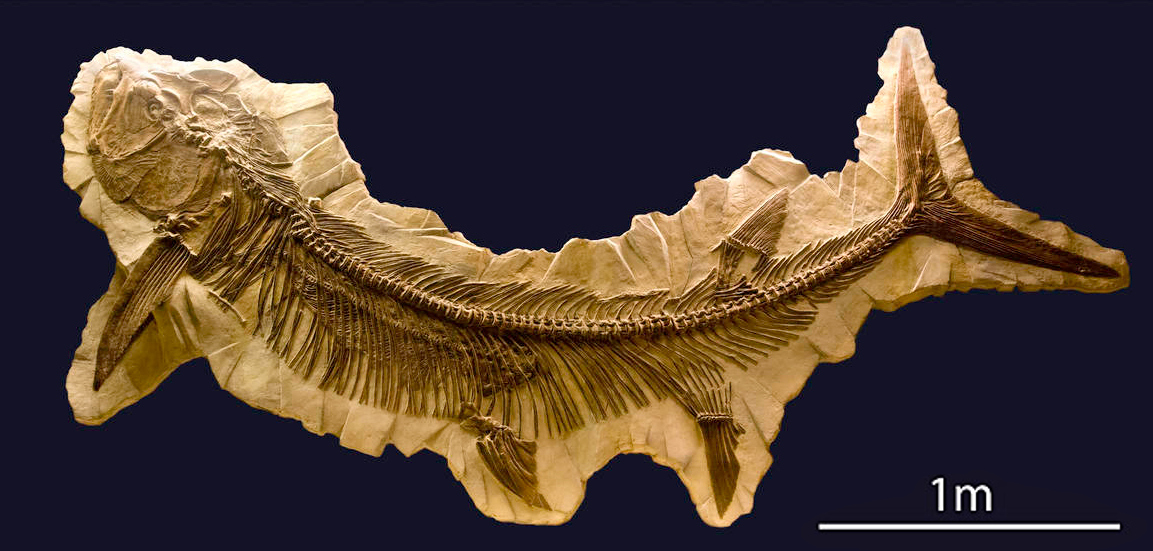
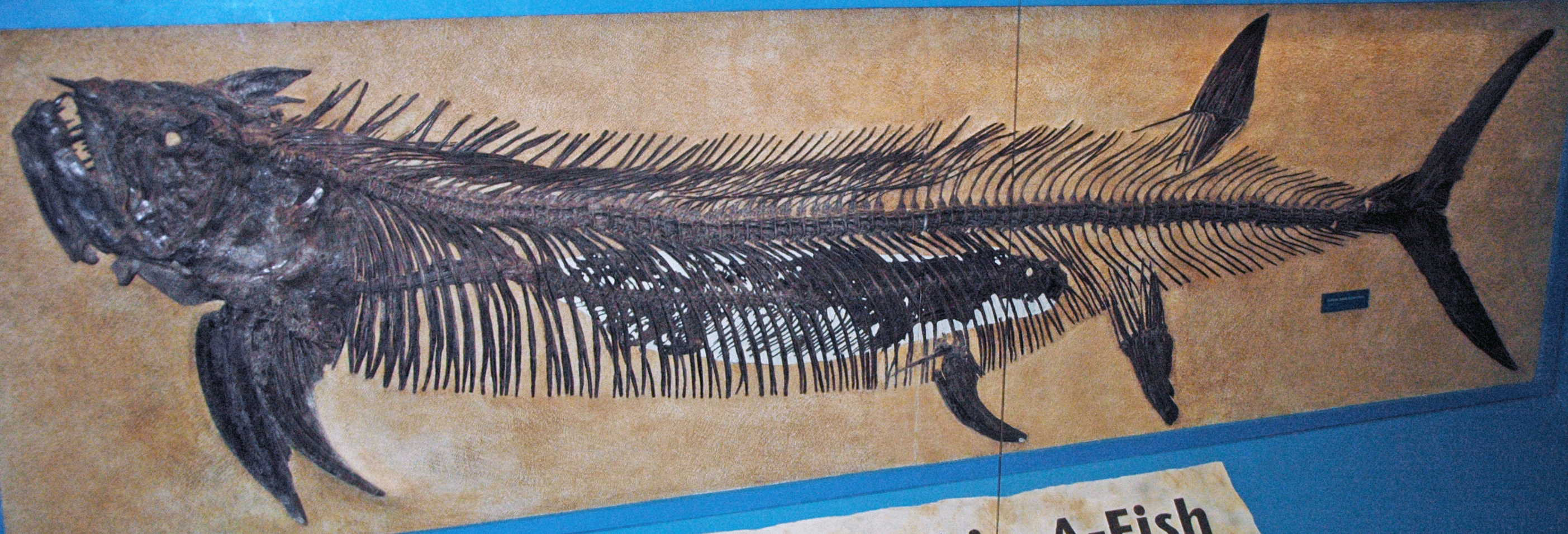
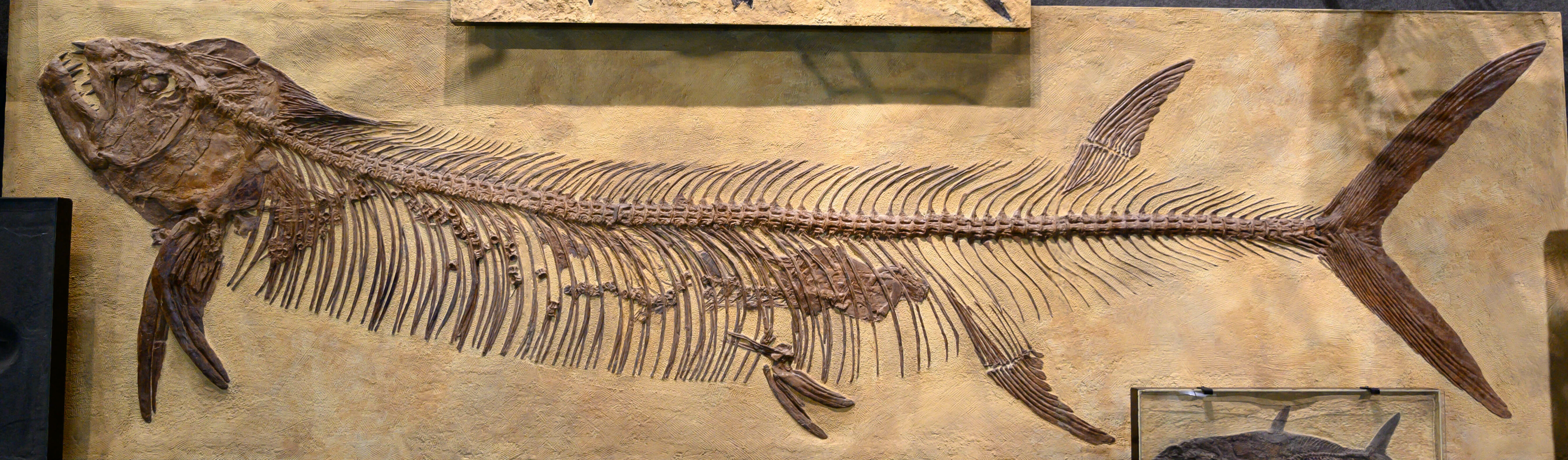
Several Xiphactinus skeletons are preserved with the fish Gillicus arcuatus swallowed whole.

Species of Xiphactinus were voracious predatory fish. At least a dozen specimens of X. audax have been collected with the remains of large, undigested or partially digested prey in their stomachs. In particular, one 4.2 metres (14 ft) fossil "Fish-Within-A-Fish" specimen was collected by George F. Sternberg with another, nearly perfectly preserved 1.9 metres (6.2 ft) long ichthyodectid Gillicus arcuatus inside of it. The larger fish apparently died soon after eating its prey, most likely owing to the smaller prey's struggling and rupturing an organ as it was being swallowed. This fossil is on display at the Sternberg Museum of Natural History in Hays, Kansas.

Like many other species in the Late Cretaceous oceans, a dead or injured individual was likely to be scavenged by sharks (Cretoxyrhina and Squalicorax). The remains of a Xiphactinus were found within a large specimen of Cretoxyrhina collected by Charles H. Sternberg. The specimen is on display at the University of Kansas Museum of Natural History.

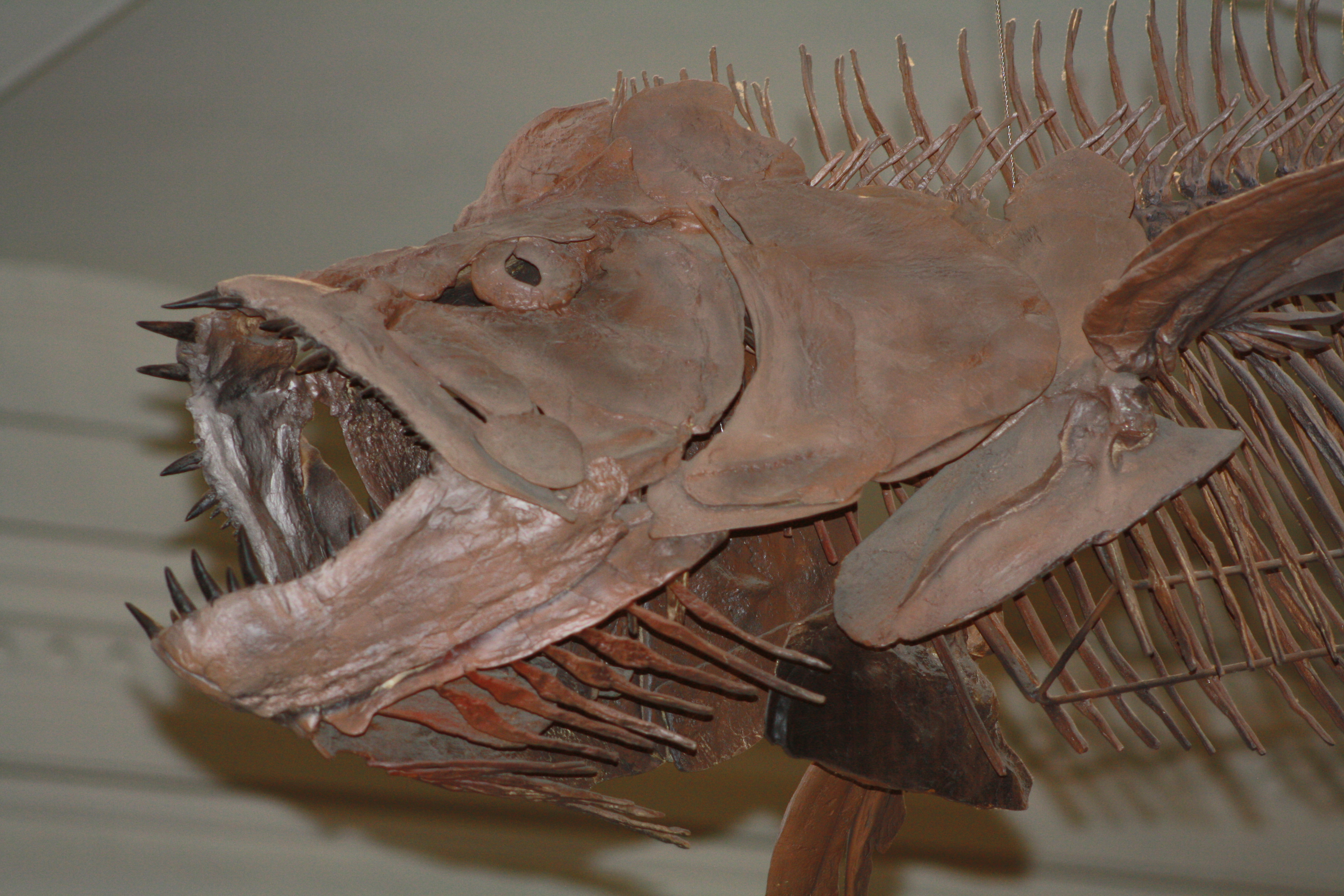
Detailed view of the skull of Xiphactinus at the American Museum of Natural History

Like modern tarpons, Xiphactinus likely spent its juvenile stage of life in shallow seaway margins for protection and to utilize rich food resources, possibly rare in open marine water, though this needs confirmation due to the lack of shallow, nearshore deposits from the Western Interior Seaway. The teeth of the juvenile specimen indicate that the diet of Xiphactinus probably didn't change notably during its growth, implying that even the small specimens would have been fish-eating predators.

== "Unicerosaurus" ==
In 1982, a former Baptist minister, Carl Baugh, began excavations on the limestone beds of the Paluxy River, near Glen Rose, Texas, famous for its dinosaur tracks. Some of the tracks resembled human footprints and had been proclaimed since 1900 as evidence that dinosaurs and modern humans had once lived alongside one another. Scientists' investigations found the supposed human footprints to be "forms of elongate dinosaur tracks, while others were selectively highlighted erosional markings, and still others (on loose blocks) probable carvings." While excavating, he found a solitary "Y-shaped" fossil that he informally called "Unicerosaurus". In a 1987 popular article, John Armstrong described the fossil as a "Y-shaped petrified bone that appears to be the neural spine from a huge fish like the Portheus of Niobrara Chalk" that Baugh's museum "declared to be the forehead horn of a newly discovered dinosaur genus". The museum's exhibit told visitors that the "horn" belonged to "the unicorn of Job 38, one of three dinosaurs mentioned in Scripture; the others being behemoth and leviathan of Job 40 and 41", and that the horn was able to fold back like the blade of a jack knife. Although some Young Earth Creationists shared Baugh's interpretations of the biblical Behemoth and Leviathan, Baugh's claims were not taken seriously either by the scientific community or major Young Earth Creationist organizations.

== In popular culture ==
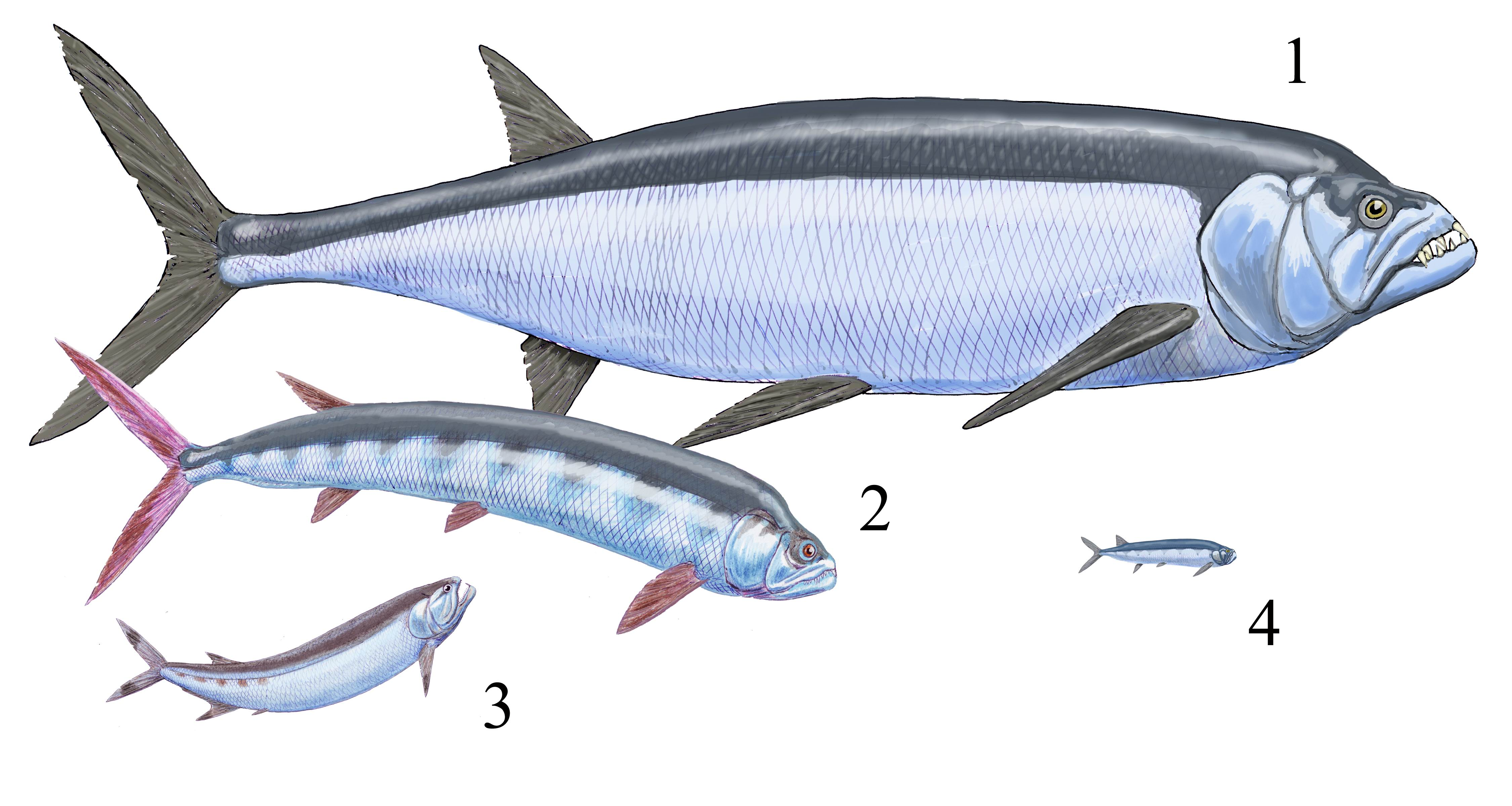
Xiphactinus compared to other ichthyodectids

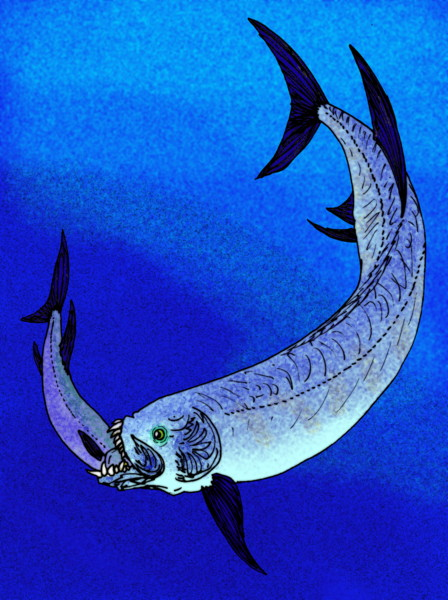
Depiction of a Xiphactinus swallowing a Gillicus

In October 2010, Kansas House Rep. Tom Sloan (R-Lawrence) announced that he would introduce legislation to make Xiphactinus audax, a.k.a. the "X-fish", the state fossil of Kansas. Ultimately, Tylosaurus was selected instead.
