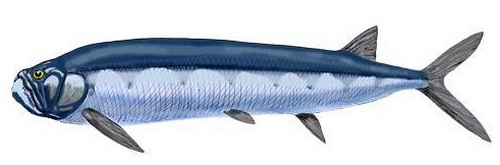
- Life restoration of C. coroninii

Scientific classification
- Kingdom: Animalia
- Phylum: Chordata
- Class: Actinopterygii
- Stem group: Teleostei
- Order: †Ichthyodectiformes
- Family: †Cladocyclidae
- Genus: †Chirocentrites; Heckel, 1849
- Species: †C. coroninii

Binomial name
- †Chirocentrites coroninii Heckel, 1849

= Chirocentrites =

Chirocentrites Temporal range: Late Cenomanian Possible Albian record

Extinct genus of ray-finned fishes

Chirocentrites is an extinct genus of marine ray-finned fish in the order Ichthyodectiformes. It contains a single species, C. coroninii, from the Late Cretaceous (Cenomanian) of Slovenia (locality also sometimes given as Gorizia, Italy). A potential specimen is also known from the Albian-aged Pietraroja Plattenkalk of southern Italy, but it has been suggested that this specimen actually represents Cladocyclus.

Another species sometimes classified in this genus, Spathodactylus (or Chirocentrites) neocomiensis Pictet, 1858 from the Hauterivian of France, appears to be morphologically distinct from Chirocentrites and needs taxonomic revision. Two other species (C. microdon Heckel, 1849 and C. gracilis Heckel, 1849) from the Cenomanian of Croatia and Slovenia are now placed in the genus Heckelichthys. The species C. guinensis from the Aptian/Albian of Equatorial Guinea & Gabon is now placed in Chiromystus.
