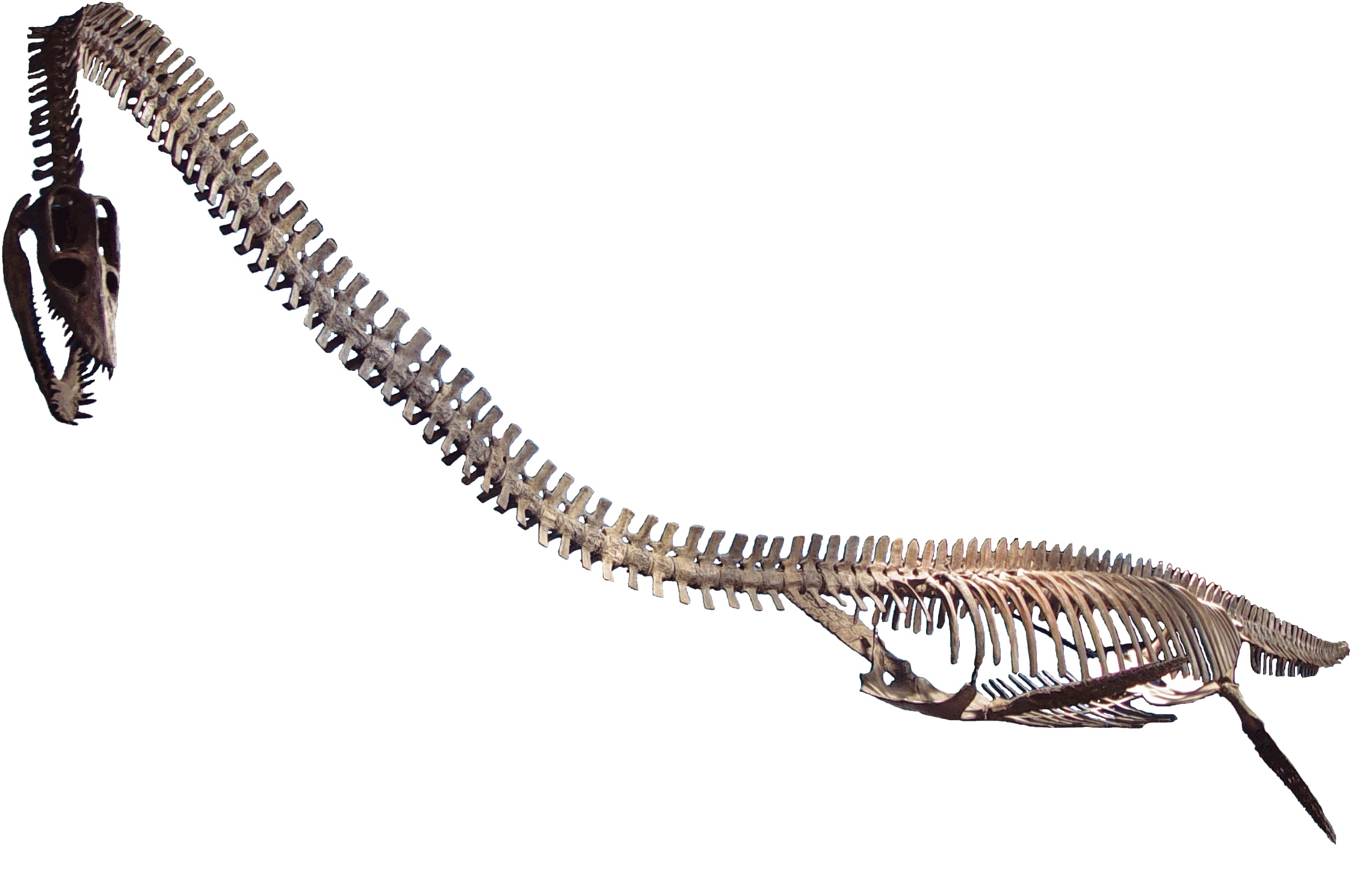
- Reconstructed skeleton in the Rocky Mountain Dinosaur Resource Center

Scientific classification
- Kingdom: Animalia
- Phylum: Chordata
- Class: Reptilia
- Superorder: †Sauropterygia
- Order: †Plesiosauria
- Superfamily: †Plesiosauroidea
- Family: †Elasmosauridae
- Subfamily: †Elasmosaurinae
- Genus: †Elasmosaurus; Cope, 1868
- Species: †E. platyurus

Binomial name
- †Elasmosaurus platyurus Cope, 1868

Synonyms
- Discosaurus carinatus Cope, 1868

= Elasmosaurus =

Elasmosaurus Temporal range: Late Cretaceous (Campanian), 80.64–77 Ma

Genus of reptiles (fossil)

Elasmosaurus (/ɪˌlæzməˈsɔːrəs, -moʊ-/) is a genus of plesiosaur that lived in North America during the Campanian stage of the Late Cretaceous period, at about 80.6 to 77 million years ago. The first specimen was discovered in 1867 near Fort Wallace, Kansas, US, and was sent to the American paleontologist Edward Drinker Cope, who named it E. platyurus in 1868. The generic name means "thin-plate reptile", and the specific name means "flat-tailed". Cope originally reconstructed the skeleton of Elasmosaurus with the skull at the end of the tail, an error which was made light of by the paleontologist Othniel Charles Marsh, and became part of their "Bone Wars" rivalry. Only one incomplete Elasmosaurus skeleton is definitely known, consisting of a fragmentary skull, the spine, and now lost pectoral and pelvic girdles, and a single species is recognized today; other species are now considered invalid or have been moved to other genera. A fragmentary specimen from Germany may belong to this genus.

Measuring 10.3 meters (34 ft) in length, Elasmosaurus would have had a streamlined body with paddle-like limbs, a short tail, a small head, and an extremely long neck. The neck alone was around 7.1 meters (23 ft) long. Along with its relative Albertonectes, it was one of the longest-necked animals to have lived, with the second largest number of neck vertebrae known, 72, at least 3 fewer than Albertonectes. The skull would have been slender and triangular, with large, fang-like teeth at the front, and smaller teeth towards the back. It had six teeth in each premaxilla of the upper jaw, and may have had 14 teeth in the maxilla and 19 in the dentary of the lower jaw. Most of the neck vertebrae were compressed sideways, and bore a longitudinal crest or keel along the sides.

The family Elasmosauridae was based on the genus Elasmosaurus, the first recognized member of this group of long-necked plesiosaurs. Elasmosaurids were well adapted for aquatic life, and used their flippers for swimming. Contrary to earlier depictions, their necks were not very flexible, and could not be held high above the water surface. It is unknown what their long necks were used for, but they may have had a function in feeding. Elasmosaurids probably ate small fish and marine invertebrates, seizing them with their long teeth, and may have used gastroliths (stomach stones) to help digest their food. Elasmosaurus is known from the Pierre Shale formation, which represents marine deposits from the Western Interior Seaway.

== History of study ==
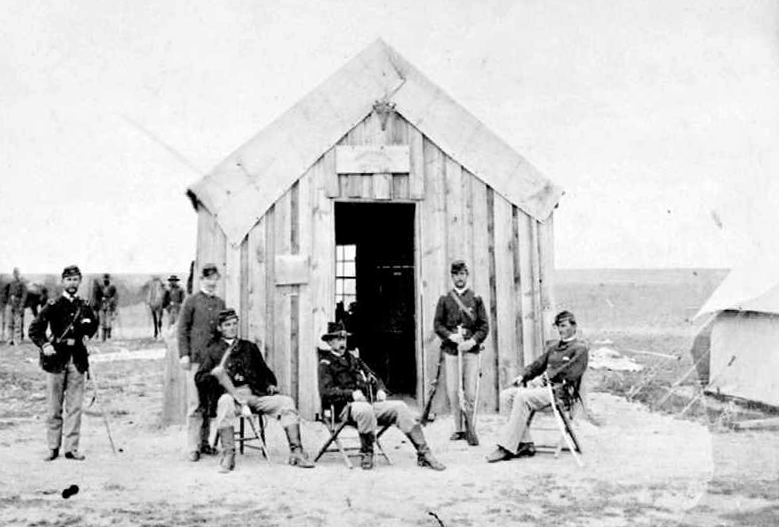
Officers at Fort Wallace, Kansas, in 1867. Theophilus H. Turner, who the same year discovered Elasmosaurus in the area, is second from left.

In early 1867, the American army surgeon Theophilus Hunt Turner and the army scout William "Medecine Bill" Comstock explored the rocks around Fort Wallace, Kansas, where they were stationed during the construction of the Union Pacific Railroad. Approximately 23 kilometers (14 mi) northeast of Fort Wallace, near McAllaster, Turner discovered the bones of a large fossil reptile in a ravine in the Pierre Shale formation, and though he had no paleontological experience, he recognized the remains as belonging to an "extinct monster". In June, Turner gave three fossil vertebrae to the American scientist John LeConte, a member of the railway survey, to take back east to be identified. In December, LeConte delivered some of the vertebrae to the American paleontologist Edward Drinker Cope at the Academy of Natural Sciences of Philadelphia (ANSP, known since 2011 as the Academy of Natural Sciences of Drexel University). Recognizing them as the remains of a plesiosaur, larger than any he had seen in Europe, Cope wrote to Turner asking him to deliver the rest of the specimen, at the ANSP's expense.

In December 1867 Turner and others from Fort Wallace returned to the site and recovered much of the vertebral column, as well as concretions that contained other bones; the material had a combined weight of 360 kilograms (800 lb). The fossils were dug or pried out of the relatively soft shale with picks and shovels, loaded on a horse-drawn wagon, and transported back to Fort Wallace. Cope sent instructions on how to pack the bones, which were thereafter sent in hay-padded crates on a military wagon east to the railroad, which had not yet reached the fort. The specimen arrived in Philadelphia by rail in March 1868, whereafter Cope examined it hurriedly; he reported on it at the March ANSP meeting, during which he named it Elasmosaurus platyurus. The generic name Elasmosaurus is a portmanteau of the Ancient Greek ἔλᾰσμᾰ (élăsmă, "metal plate") prefixed onto σαῦρος (saûros, "lizard"), in reference to the "plate" bones of the sternal and pelvic regions. However, this name was translated as "thin-plate reptile" in many later works. The specific name also comes from the Ancient Greek πλατύς (platýs, "flat") and ουρά (ourá, "tail"), all meaning "flat-tailed", in reference to the compressed "tail" (actually the neck) and laminae of the vertebrae there.

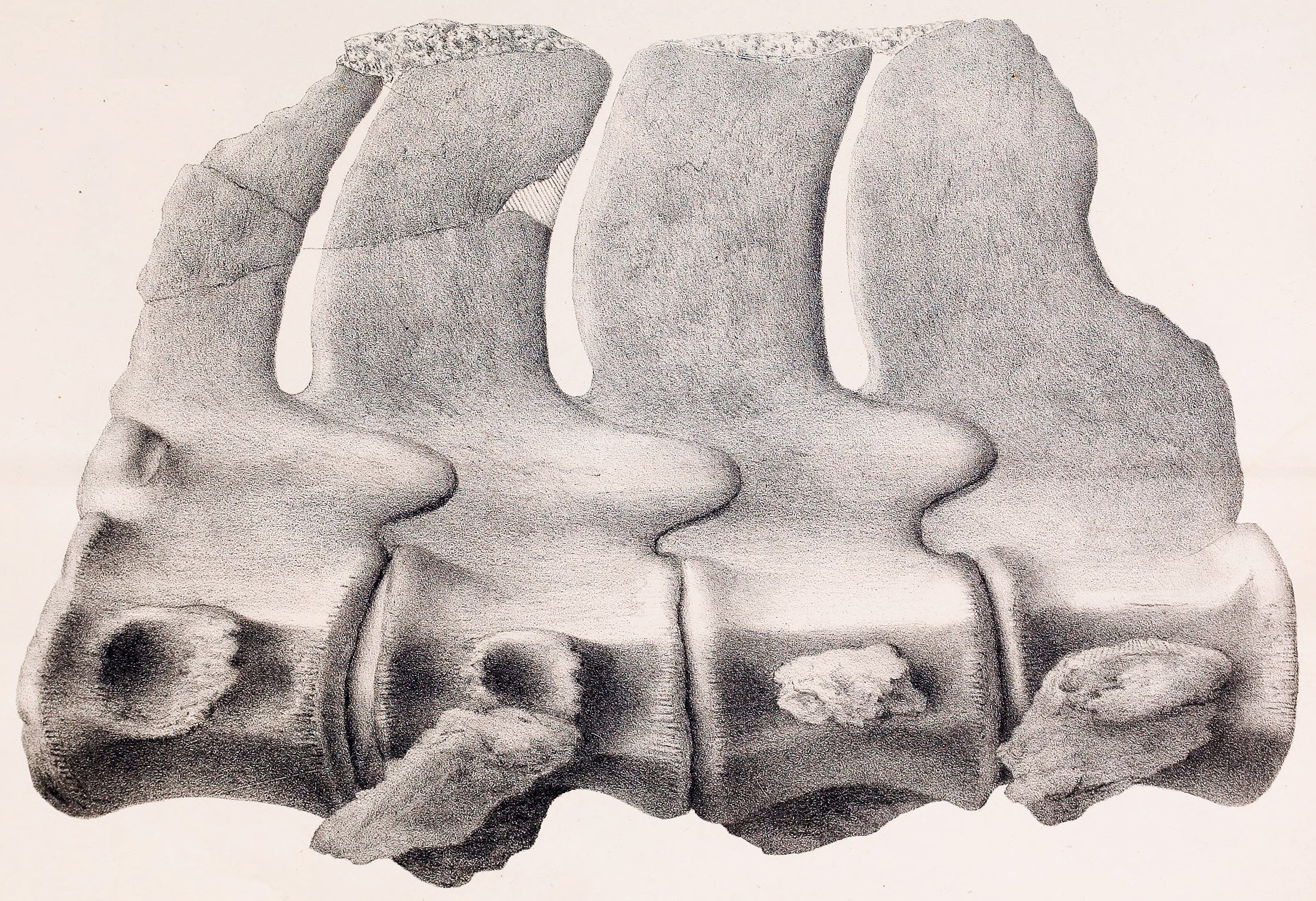
Back vertebrae of the holotype, 1869

Cope requested that Turner search for more parts of the Elasmosaurus specimen, and was sent more fossils during August or September 1868. The ANSP thanked Turner for his "very valuable gift" at their meeting in December 1868, and Turner visited the museum during spring, at a time when Cope was absent. Turner died unexpectedly at Fort Wallace on July 27, 1869, without seeing the completion of the work he began, but Cope continued to write him, unaware of his death until 1870. The circumstances around Turner's discovery of the type specimen were not covered in Cope's report, and remained unknown until Turner's letters were published in 1987. Elasmosaurus was the first major fossil discovery in Kansas (and the largest from there at the time), and marked the beginning of a fossil collecting rush that sent thousands of fossils from Kansas to prominent museums on the American east coast. Elasmosaurus was one of few plesiosaurs known from the New World at the time, and the first recognized member of the long-necked family of plesiosaurs, the Elasmosauridae.

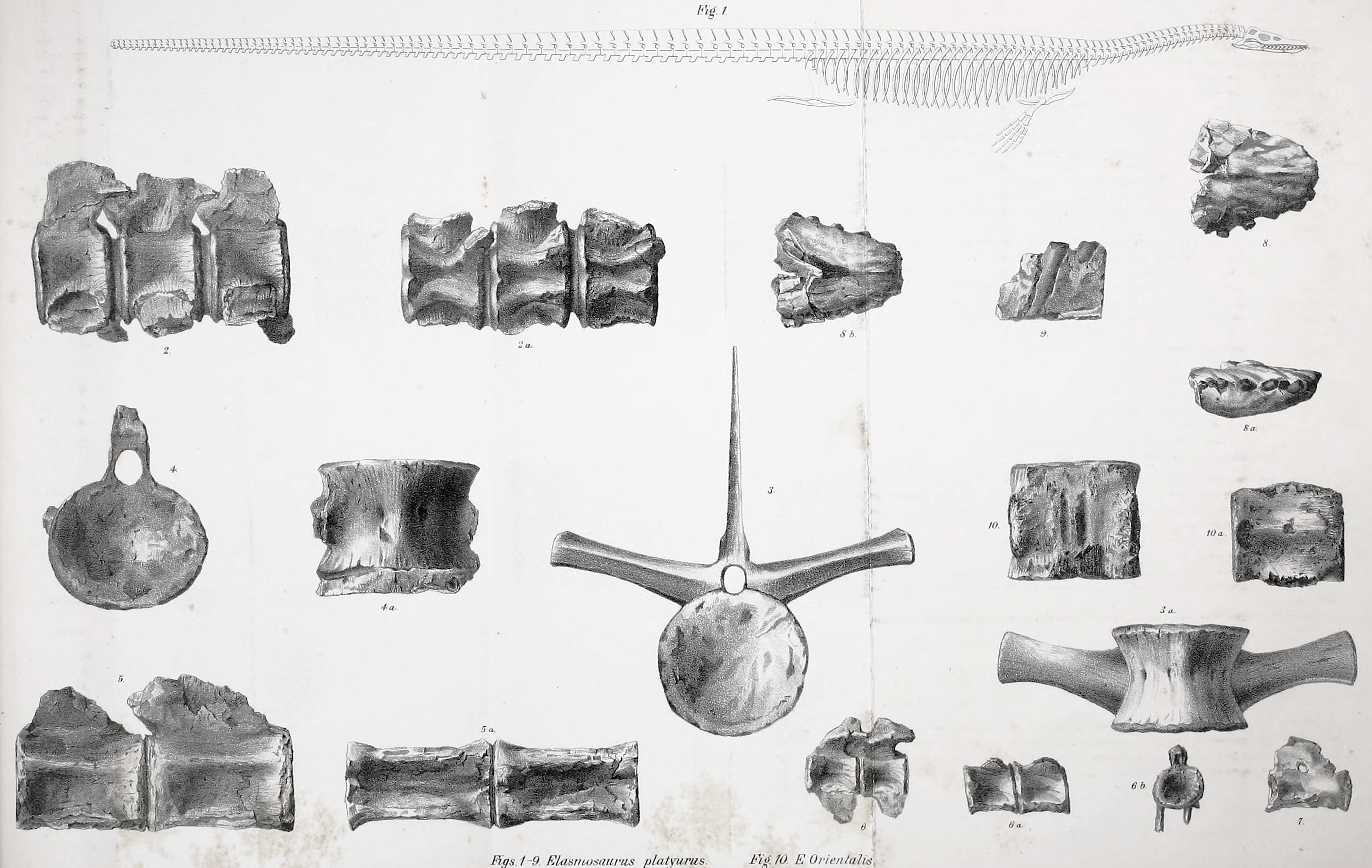
Edward Drinker Cope's original 1869 reconstruction of Elasmosaurus, above, with the head on the wrong end and no hind-limbs, and holotype elements of E. platyurus (1–9) and E. orientalis (10), below

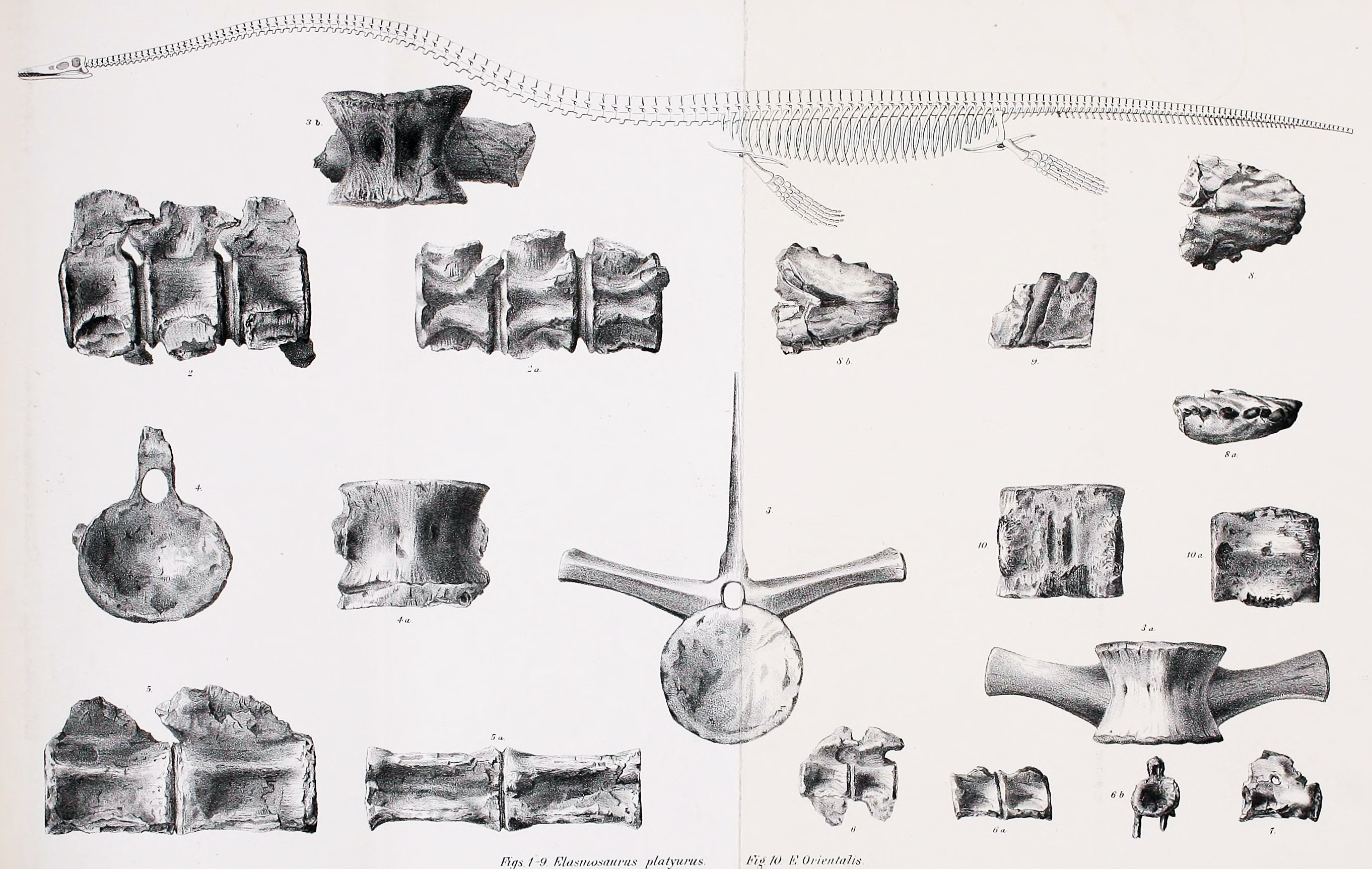
Cope's corrected 1870 reconstruction of Elasmosaurus, above

In 1869 Cope scientifically described and figured Elasmosaurus, and the preprint version of the manuscript contained a reconstruction of the skeleton which he had earlier presented during his report at an ANSP meeting in September 1868. The reconstruction showed Elasmosaurus with a short neck and a long tail, unlike other plesiosaurs, and Cope was also unsure whether it had hind limbs. At an ANSP meeting a year and a half later, in March 1870, the American paleontologist Joseph Leidy (Cope's mentor) noted that Cope's reconstruction of Elasmosaurus showed the skull at the wrong end of the vertebral column, at the end of the tail instead of the neck. Cope had apparently concluded that the tail vertebrae belonged to the neck, since the jaws had been found at that end of the skeleton, even though the opposite end terminated in the axis and atlas bones that are found in the neck. Leidy also concluded that Elasmosaurus was identical to Discosaurus, a plesiosaur he had named in 1851.

To hide his mistake, Cope attempted to recall all copies of the preprint article, and printed a corrected version with a new skeletal reconstruction that placed the head on the neck (though it reversed the orientation of the individual vertebrae) and different wording in 1870. In a reply to Leidy, Cope claimed that he had been misled by the fact that Leidy had arranged the vertebrae of Cimoliasaurus in the reverse order in his 1851 description of that genus, and pointed out that his reconstruction had been corrected. Cope also rejected the idea that Elasmosaurus and Discosaurus were identical, and noted that the latter and Cimoliasaurus did not have any distinguishing features. Though Cope had tried to destroy the preprints, one copy came to the attention of the American paleontologist Othniel Charles Marsh, who made light of the mistake. This led to antagonism between Cope, who was embarrassed by the mistake, and Marsh, who brought up the mistake repeatedly for decades. Marsh returned to the issue during their controversy in the New York Herald in the 1890s (Marsh claimed he had pointed out the error to Cope immediately), when their dispute gained widespread public attention. The argument was part of the "Bone Wars" rivalry between the two, and is well known in the history of paleontology.

Because of Cope's reputation as a brilliant paleontologist, it has been questioned why he would make such an obvious anatomical error. It has been suggested that, as a unique specimen in 1868, the original Elasmosaurus may have been hard to interpret based on the knowledge available at the time. Also, Cope initially thought it consisted of two specimens of different animals – in an 1868 letter to LeConte, Cope had referred to the supposed "smaller specimen" as Discosaurus carinatus. Cope was only in his late twenties and not formally trained in paleontology, and may have been influenced by Leidy's mistake of reversing the vertebral column of Cimoliasaurus. In 2002 the American art historian Jane P. Davidson noted that the fact that other scientists early on had pointed out Leidy's error argues against this explanation, adding that Cope was not convinced he had made a mistake. Plesiosaur anatomy was sufficiently well known at the time that Cope should not have made the mistake, according to Davidson. Cope did little work on the specimen since his 1870 description, and it was kept in storage for nearly 30 years. It was only redescribed in detail in 2005 by the German paleontologist Sven Sachs.

=== Known and possible fossil elements ===
Reconstructed skeleton, Academy of Natural Sciences of Philadelphia

Today, the incomplete holotype specimen, cataloged as ANSP 10081, is the only definite specimen of Elasmosaurus. It was long exhibited, but is now stored in a cabinet with other assigned fragments. The specimen consists of the premaxillae, part of the hind-section of the right maxilla, two maxilla fragments with teeth, the front part of the dentaries, three more jaw fragments, the occipital condyle, two cranial fragments of indeterminable identity, 72 cervical vertebrae of the neck, including the atlas and axis, 3 pectoral vertebrae, 6 back vertebrae, 4 sacral vertebrae, 18 tail vertebrae, as well as rib fragments. In 2013 an incomplete neck vertebra centrum of the holotype that had been mentioned by Cope but thought to have been lost was rediscovered in storage by Sachs, and the neck vertebra count was revised from 71 to 72. The neck vertebrae have been taphonomically distorted (changes occurring during decay and fossilization), with some parts being unnaturally compressed or displaced, and some vertebrae are not well prepared. In 1986 a three-dimensional reconstruction of the holotype skeleton was completed and is now displayed at the ANSP. This cast was later copied by the company Triebold Paleontology Incorporated, and replicas were provided to other museums. The replica at the Fort Wallace Museum measures about 12.8 meters (42 ft) in length.

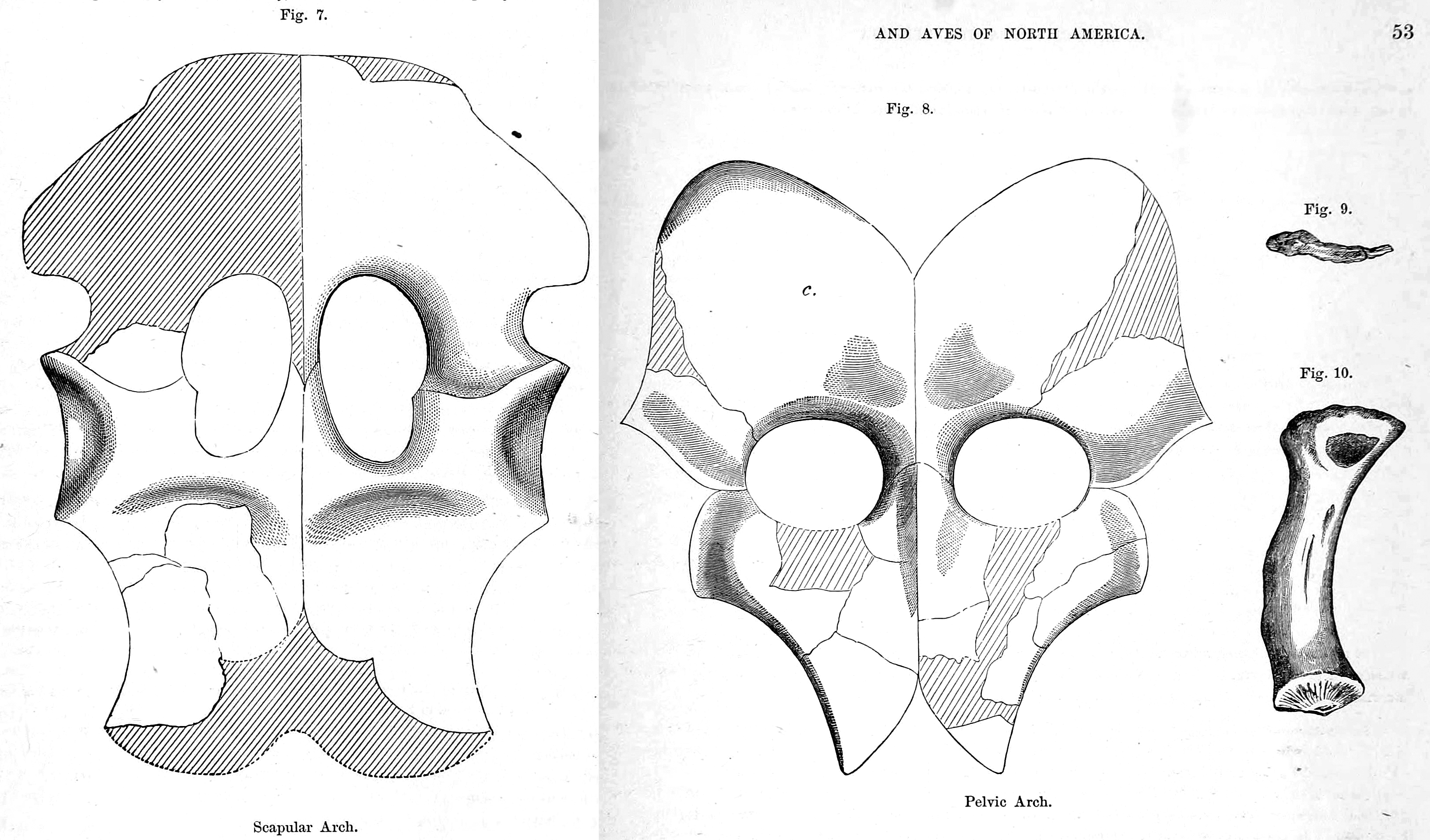
Cope's 1869 figures of the now lost pectoral (left) and pelvic (right) girdles of the holotype; the generic name refers to these "plate" bones

Though Cope described and figured the pectoral and pelvic girdles of Elasmosaurus in 1869 and 1875, these elements were noted as missing from the collection by the American paleontologist Samuel Wendell Williston in 1906. Cope had loaned these elements to the English sculptor Benjamin Waterhouse Hawkins to help prepare them out of their surrounding concretions. At the time, Hawkins was working on a "Paleozoic Museum" in New York's Central Park, where a reconstruction of Elasmosaurus was to appear, an American equivalent to his life-sized Crystal Palace Dinosaurs in London. In May 3, 1871, much of the exhibit material in Hawkins' workshop was destroyed by vandals for unclear reasons and their fragments buried; it is possible that the girdle elements of Elasmosaurus were at the workshop and were likewise destroyed. Nothing was subsequently mentioned about their loss by Hawkins or Cope. In 2018, Davidson and the American paleontologist Michael J. Everhart documented the events leading up to the disappearance of these fossils, and suggested that a photo and drawing of Waterhouse's workshop from 1869 appear to show concretions on the floor that may have been the unprepared girdles of Elasmosaurus. They also noted that conceptual sketches of the Palaeozoic Museum show that the model Elasmosaurus was originally envisioned with a long "tail", though later updated with a long neck. Davidson and Everhart concluded that the girdle fossils were most likely destroyed in Hawkins' workshop.

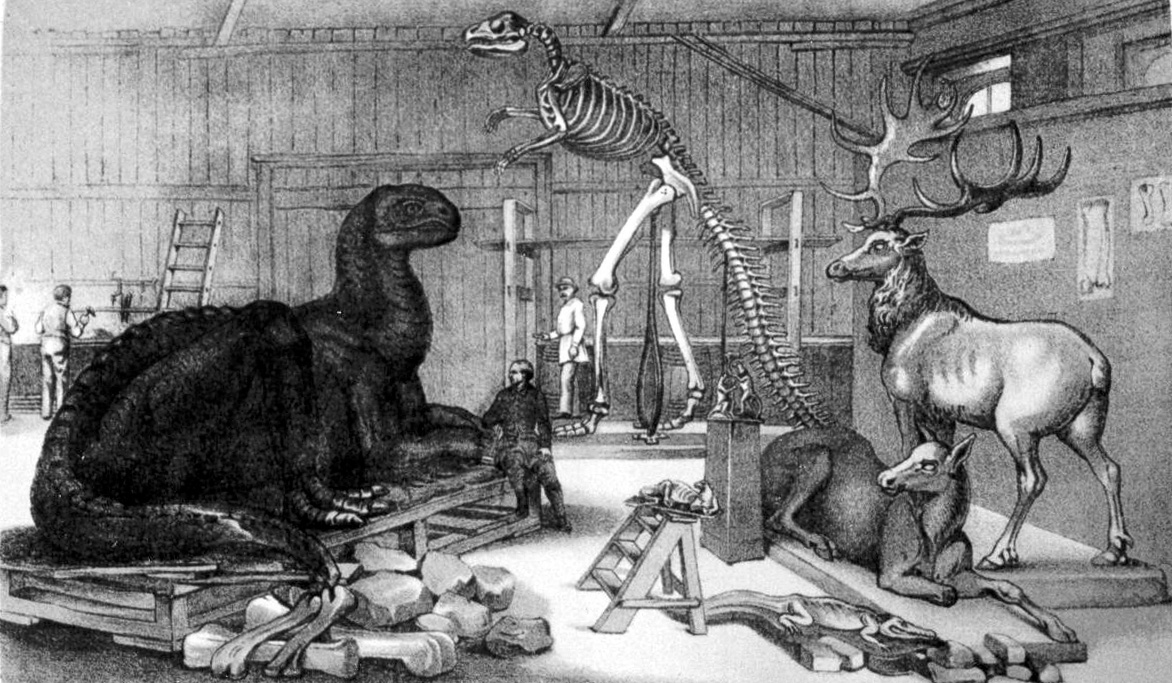
1869 drawing of Benjamin Waterhouse Hawkins' workshop in Central Park; the rounded shapes in the lower center left may be concretions that contained the now missing girdle fossils of the holotype

Fossils that may have belonged to the holotype were found by the American geologist Benjamin Franklin Mudge in 1871, but have probably been lost since. Additional plesiosaur fossils were recovered near the original locality in 1954, 1991, 1994, and 1998, including back vertebrae, ribs, gastralia (belly ribs), and gastroliths. As none of these elements overlap with those of the holotype specimen, Everhart suggested in 2005 they belonged to the same individual, and that the parts had been separated before burial of the carcass. He also noted that a small stone wedged in the neural canal of one of the tail vertebrae of the holotype may be a gastrolith, based on its polished appearance. In 2007 the Colombian paleontologists Leslie Noè and Marcela Gómez-Pérez expressed doubt that the additional elements belonged to the type specimen, or even to Elasmosaurus, due to lack of evidence. They explained that elements missing from the holotype may have been lost to weathering or simply not collected, and that parts may have been lost or damaged during transportation or preparation. Gastroliths may also not have been recognized as such during collection, since such stones were not reported from a plesiosaur until ten years after.

In 2017 Sachs and Joachim Ladwig suggested that a fragmentary elasmosaurid skeleton from the upper Campanian of Kronsmoor in Schleswig-Holstein, Germany, and housed in the Naturkunde-Museum Bielefeld, may have belonged to Elasmosaurus. Additional parts of the same skeleton are housed at the Institute for Geology of the University of Hamburg, as well as in private collections. Combined, the specimen consists of neck, back and tail vertebrae, phalanges, a tooth, limb elements, 110 gastroliths, and unidentifiable fragments.

== Description ==
Size compared to a human

Though the only known specimen of Elasmosaurus (holotype specimen ANSP 10081) is fragmentary and missing many elements, related elasmosaurids show it would have had a compact, streamlined body, long, paddle-like limbs, a short tail, a proportionately small head, and an extremely long neck. The neck of Elasmosaurus is estimated at 7.1 meters (23 ft) in length; thus, Elasmosaurus and its relative Albertonectes were some of the longest-necked animals ever to have lived, with the largest number of neck vertebrae of any known vertebrate animals. In spite of their many neck vertebrae, the necks of elasmosaurids were less than half as long as those of the longest-necked sauropod dinosaurs. Initially, in his 1869 description of Elasmosaurus, Cope estimated the length of the animal by summing up vertebral lengths and estimations of missing parts, resulting in a total length of 13.1 meters (43 ft); he believed that the living animal would have been slightly larger due to cartilage present between the vertebral bodies, and was estimated at 13.7 meters (45 ft). However, in 1952, the American paleontologist Samuel Welles estimated the body length to have been 10.3 meters (34 ft), a number that was repeated by José Patricio O'Gorman in 2016.

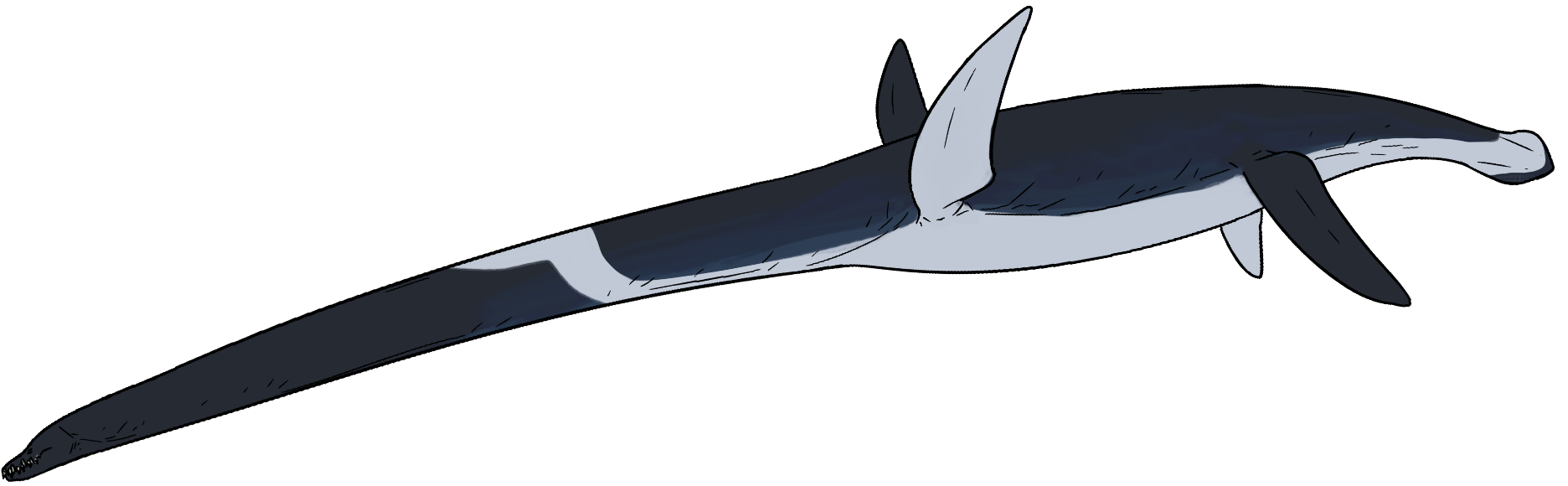
Life restoration

Like other elasmosaurids, Elasmosaurus would have had a slender, triangular skull. The snout was rounded and almost formed a semi-circle when viewed from above, and the premaxillae (which form the front of the upper jaw) bore a distnct sagittal keel at the midline. It is uncertain how many teeth Elasmosaurus had, due to the fragmentary state of the fossils. It probably had six teeth in each premaxilla, and the teeth preserved there were formed like large fangs. The number of premaxillary teeth distinguished Elasmosaurus from primitive plesiosauroids and most other elasmosaurids, which usually had fewer. The two teeth at the front were smaller than the succeeding ones, and were located between the first two teeth in the dentaries of the lower jaws. The known teeth of the front part of the lower jaw were large fangs, and the teeth at the back of the jaws appear to have been smaller. The dentition of elasmosaurids was generally heterodont (irregular throughout the jaws), with the teeth becoming progressively smaller from front to back. The maxillae (largest tooth bearing bone of the upper jaw) of elasmosaurids usually contained 14 teeth, whereas the dentaries (the main part of the lower jaws) usually contained 17 to 19. The teeth interlocked, and their tooth crowns were slender and rounded in cross-section. The mandibular symphysis (where the two halves of the lower jaw connected) was well ossified, with no visible suture.

The pectoral and pelvic girdles of the holotype specimen were noted as missing by 1906, but observations about these elements were since made based on the original descriptions and figures from the late 19th century. The shoulder blades (scapulae) were fused and met at the midline, bearing no trace of a median bar. The upper processes of the shoulder blades were very broad, and the "necks" of the shoulder blades were long. The pectoral girdle had a long bar at the middle, a supposedly advanced feature thought to be absent from juvenile plesiosaurs. The ischia (a pair of bones that formed part of the pelvis) were joined at the middle, so that a medial bar was present along the length of the pelvis, a feature usually not found in plesiosaurs. Like other elasmosaurids (and plesiosaurs in general), Elasmosaurus would have had large, paddle-like limbs with very long digits. The paddles at the front (the pectoral paddles) were longer than those at the back (the pelvic paddles).

=== Vertebrae ===
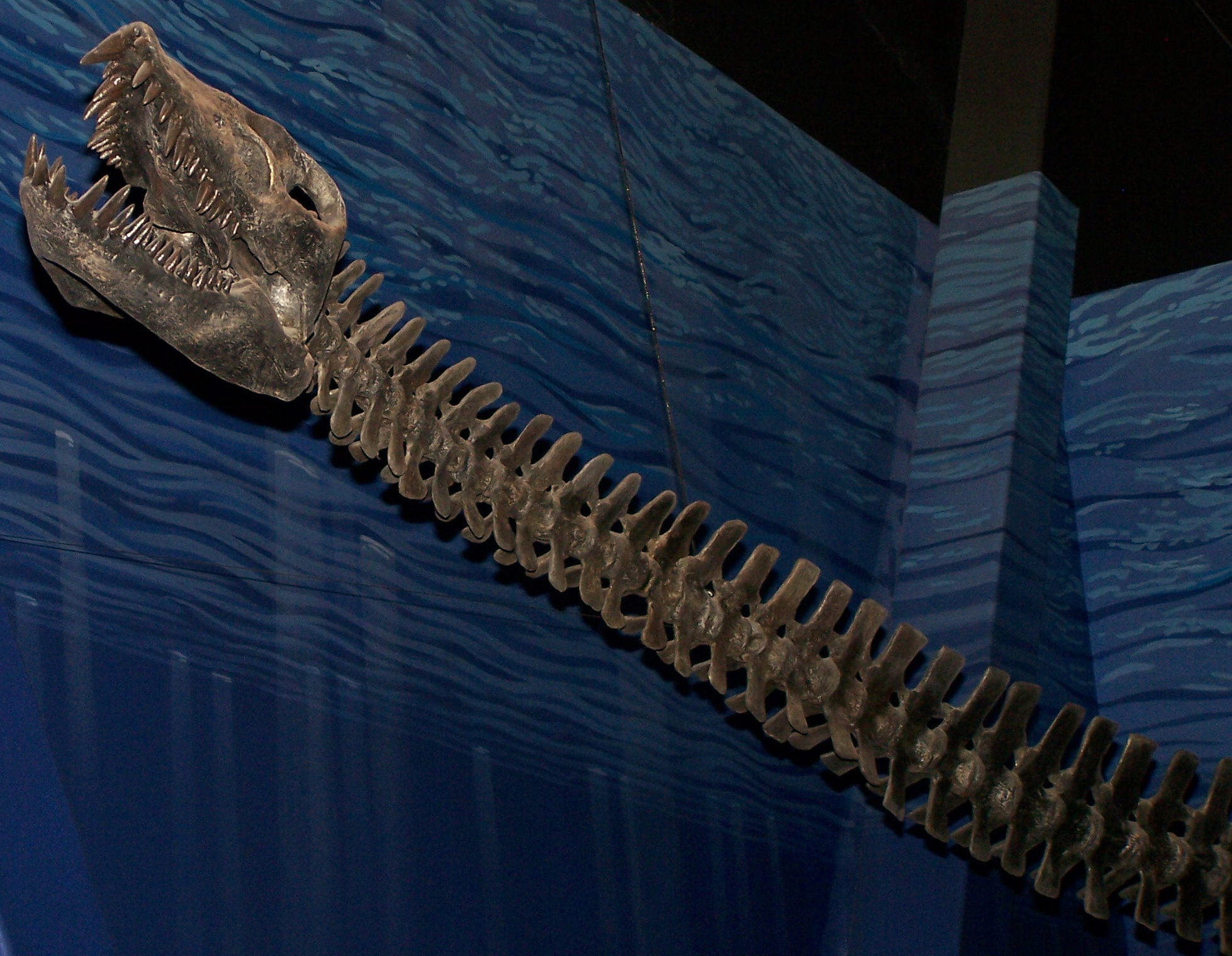
Reconstructed skull and neck, North American Museum of Ancient Life

Unlike those of many other long-necked animals, the individual neck vertebrae were not particularly elongated; rather, the extreme neck length was achieved by a much increased number of vertebrae. Elasmosaurus differed from all other plesiosaurs by having 72 neck vertebrae; more may have been present but were later lost to erosion or after excavation. Only Albertonectes had more neck vertebrae, at least 75, and the two are the only plesiosaurs with a count higher than 70; more than 60 vertebrae is very derived (or "advanced") for plesiosaurs.

The atlas and axis bone complex, consisting of the first two neck vertebrae and articulated with the back of the skull, was long, low, and horizontally rectangular in side-view. The centra, or "bodies", of these vertebrae were co-ossified in the holotype specimen, which indicates it was an adult. The neural arches of these vertebrae were very thin and rather high, which gave the neural canal (the opening through the middle of the vertebrae) a triangular outline when seen from the back. The lower part of the neural canal was narrow towards the back by the axis, where it was half the breadth of the centrum. It became broader towards the front, where it was almost the same breadth as the centrum of the atlas. The neural arches were also more robust there than in the axis, and the neural canal was higher. The neural spine was low and directed upwards and back. The centra of the atlas and axis were of equal length, and had a quadratic shape in side view. The surface (or facet) where the axis articulated with the next vertebra had an oval outline, and an excavation for the neural canal in the middle of its upper edge. A distinct keel ran along the lower middle of the atlas and axis vertebrae.

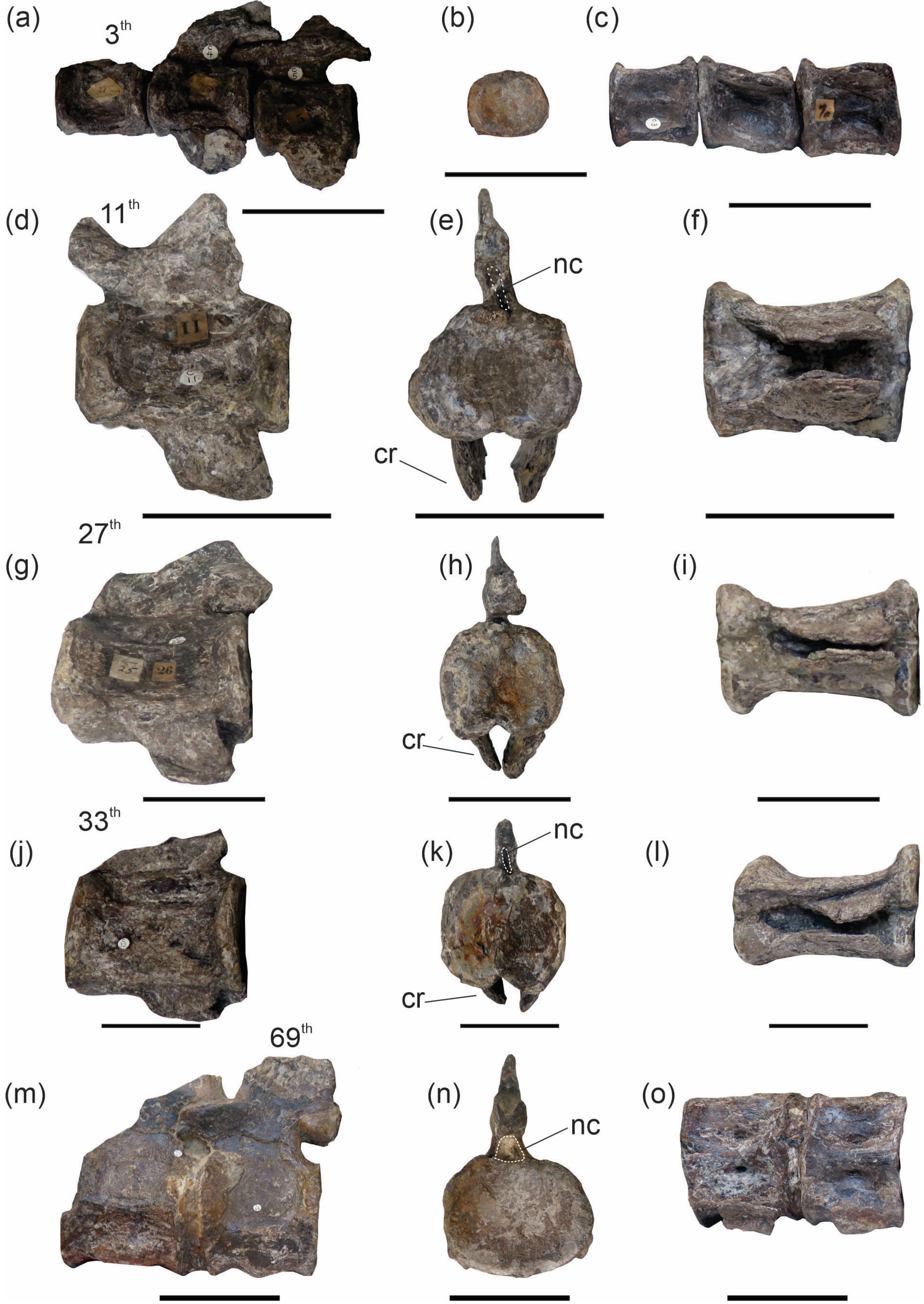
Cervical vertebrae from different areas of the holotype's neck shown from the left, behind, and below

Most of the neck vertebrae were compressed sideways, especially at the middle of the neck. A crest (also termed ridge or keel) ran longitudinally along the side of the neck vertebrae (a feature typical of elasmosaurids), visible from the third to the fifty-fifth vertebrae, at the hind part of the neck. This crest was positioned at the middle of the centrum in the front vertebrae, and at the upper half of the centrum from the 19th vertebra and onwards. The crest would have served to anchor the musculature of the neck. The centra differed in shape depending on the position of the vertebrae in the neck; that of the third vertebra was about as long as it was broad, but the centra became longer than broad from the fourth vertebra and onwards. The centra became more elongated at the middle of the neck, but became shorter again at the back of the neck, with the length and breadth being about equal at the 61st vertebra, and those of the hindmost vertebrae being broader than long. The articular surfaces of the vertebrae in the front of the neck were broad oval, and moderately deepened, with rounded, thickened edges, with an excavation (or cavity) at the upper and lower sides. Further back in the front part of the neck, around the 25th vertebra, the lower edge of the articular facets became more concave, and the facet shaped like a quadrate with rounded edges. By the 63rd vertebra, the articular facet was also quadratic in shape with rounded edges, whereas the centra of the hindmost vertebrae had a broad oval outline.

The neural arches of the neck vertebrae were well fused to the centra, leaving no visible sutures, and the neural canal was narrow in the front vertebrae, becoming more prominently developed in the hind vertebrae, where it was as broad as high, and almost circular. The pre-and post-zygapophyses of the neck vertebrae, processes that articulated adjacent vertebrae so they fit together, were of equal length; the former reached entirely over the level of the centrum whereas the latter reached only with their back half. The neural spines of the neck vertebrae appear to have been low, and almost semi-circular by the 20th vertebra. The facets where the neck ribs articulated with the neck vertebrae were placed on the lower sides of the centra, but were only placed higher in the last three vertebrae, reaching around the middle of the sides. The neck ribs were semicircular to quadratic in side view, and were directed rather straight down. The bottom of each neck vertebrae had pairs of nutritive foramina (openings) at the middle, separated by a ridge, which became progressively more prominent and thickened towards the back of the neck.

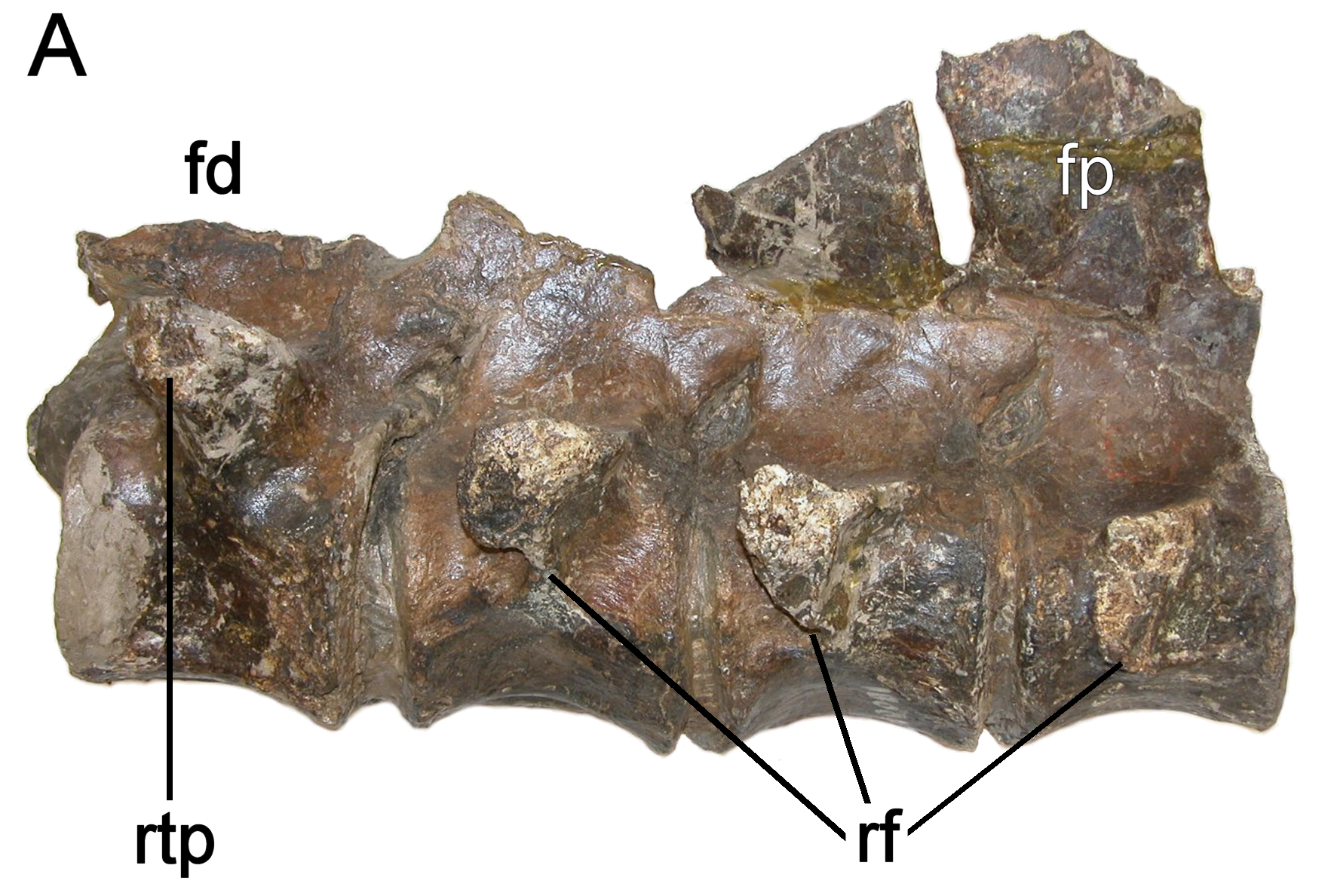
Vertebrae from the pectoral region of the holotype specimen

The vertebrae that transitioned between the neck and back vertebrae in the pectoral region of plesiosaurs, close to the front margin of the forelimb girdle, are often termed pectoral vertebrae. Elasmosaurus had three pectoral vertebrae, which is a common number for elasmosaurids. The rib facets of the pectoral vertebrae were triangular in shape and situated on transverse processes, and the centra bore pairs of nutritive foramina in the middle of the lower sides. The back vertebrae had rib facets level with the neural canal, and the front and back part of the transverse processes here had distinct ridges on their margins. Here the rib facets where placed higher than the transverse processes, separating the two, and were oval to rectangular in outline. The pre-zygapophyses here were shorter than those in the neck and pectoral vertebrae, and only reached above the level of the centrum with the front third of their length. The post-zygapophyses reached over the level of the centrum with the back half of their length. Back vertebrae are not useful for distinguishing between elasmosaurids, since they are not diagnostic at the genus level.

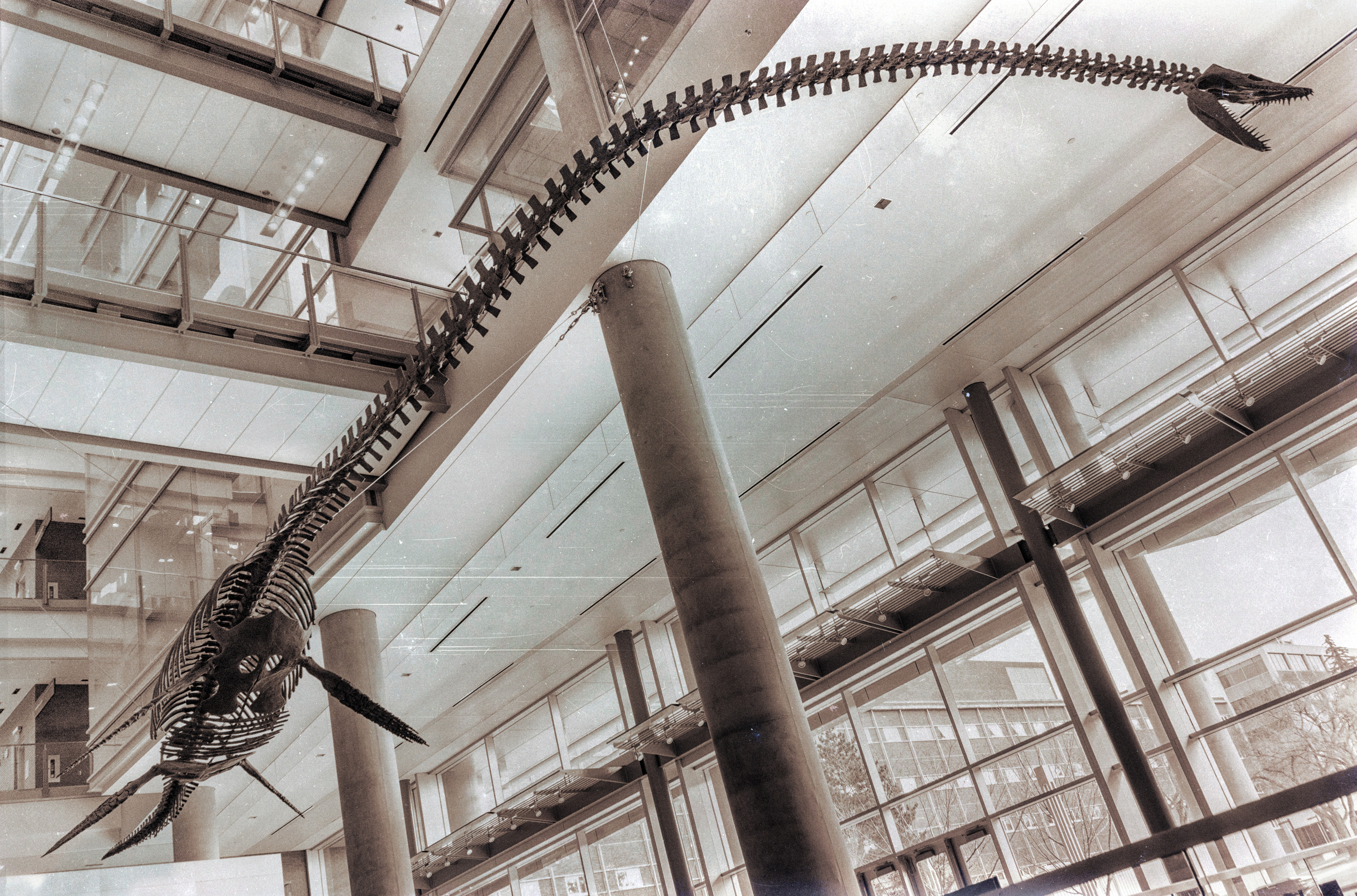
Reconstructed skeleton shown from below, Centennial Centre for Interdisciplinary Science

Elasmosaurus had four sacral vertebrae (the fused vertebrae that form the sacrum connected to the pelvis), a number typical of elasmosaurids. The transverse processes here were very short, and the rib facets increased in size from the first to the fourth sacral vertebra. A ridge ran along the top of these vertebrae, and the lower sides of the centra were rounded, and bore pairs of nutritive foramina, separated by low ridges. The first tail (or caudal) vertebra could be distinguished by the preceding sacral vertebra by having smaller rib facets, and by being positioned in the lower half of the centrum. These vertebrae were almost circular in shape, and the first two bore a narrow keel in the middle of the upper side. The rib facets of the tail vertebrae were located on the lower side of the centra, and their oval shape became larger and broader from the third vertebra and onwards, but became smaller from the 14th vertebra. Here, the pre-zygapophyses also reached over the level of the centra for most of their length, while the post-zygapophyses reached over this level by half their length. The lower part of the centra were rounded from the first to the third tail vertebrae, but concave from the fourth to the 18th. The usual number of tail vertebrae in elasmosaurids is 30. Since the last tail-vertebrae of elasmosaurids were fused into a structure similar to the pygostyle of birds, it is possible this supported a tail-fin, but the shape it would have had is unknown.

== Formerly assigned species ==
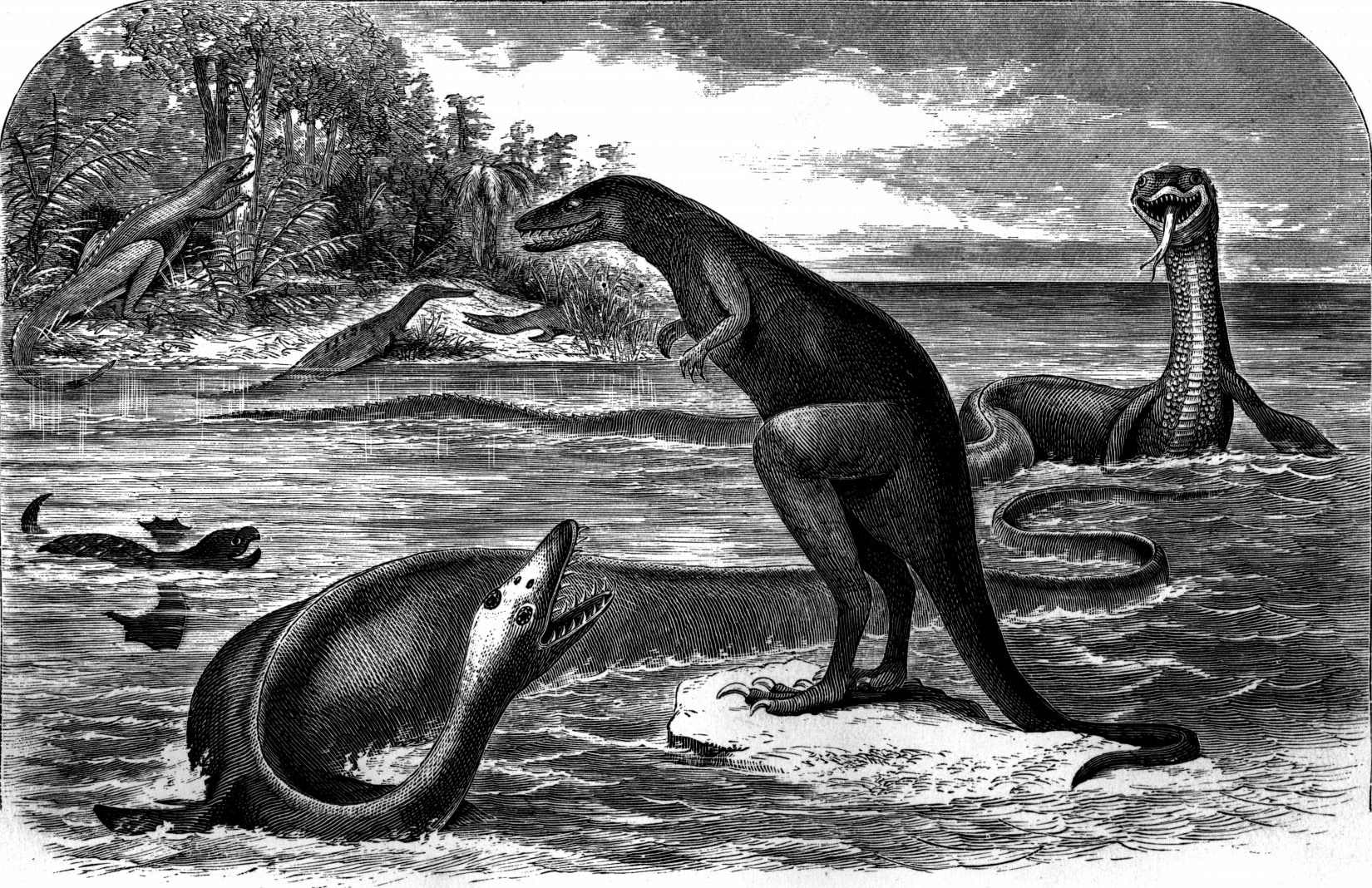
Cope's outdated 1869 restoration of fossil reptiles from New Jersey, including a short-necked E. orientalis confronting a Dryptosaurus

Following the description of the type species, E. platyurus, a number of other Elasmosaurus species were described by Cope, Williston, and other authors. However, none of these species are still definitely referable to the genus Elasmosaurus today, and most of them either have been moved to genera of their own or are considered dubious names, nomina dubia – that is, with no distinguishing features, and therefore of questionable validity.

Accompanying his 1869 description of E. platyurus, Cope named another species of Elasmosaurus, E. orientalis, based on two back vertebrae from New Jersey. He distinguished E. orientalis from E. platyurus by the more strongly developed processes known as parapophyses on the vertebrae, in which he considered it to approach closer to Cimoliasaurus; however, he still assigned it to Elasmosaurus on account of its large size and angled sides. The first of these vertebrae was used as a doorstop in a tailor's shop, whereas the other was found in a pit by Samuel Lockwood, a superintendent. Cope gave the name orientalis to the new species, on account of it possibly having a more easterly distribution than E. platyurus. Leidy subsequently moved E. orientalis to the now dubious genus Discosaurus in the following year. In 1952 Welles considered the species a nomen dubium, given how fragmentary it was.

In 1869 Cope also published an article about the fossil reptiles of New Jersey, wherein he described E. orientalis as an animal with a "long neck". Yet, in an accompanying illustration Cope showed a short-necked Elasmosaurus confronting a Dryptosaurus (then Laelaps), with a plesiosaur-like Mosasaurus and other animals in the background. According to Davidson, it is uncertain which species of Elasmosaurus is depicted, but if it is E. orientalis, the short neck contradicts Cope's own text, and if E. platyurus, he showed the animal with a short neck after acknowledging this was incorrect. Davidson has suggested that even though Leidy had pointed out Cope's error in 1868, Cope may not have accepted this. In an 1870 reply to Leidy, Cope himself stated that the generic placement of E. orientalis was in doubt, and that he had illustrated it with a short neck due to believing this was the condition of Cimoliasaurus. If more remains showed E. orientalis to have had a long neck like Elasmosaurus, he stated the image may instead represent Cimoliasaurus better.

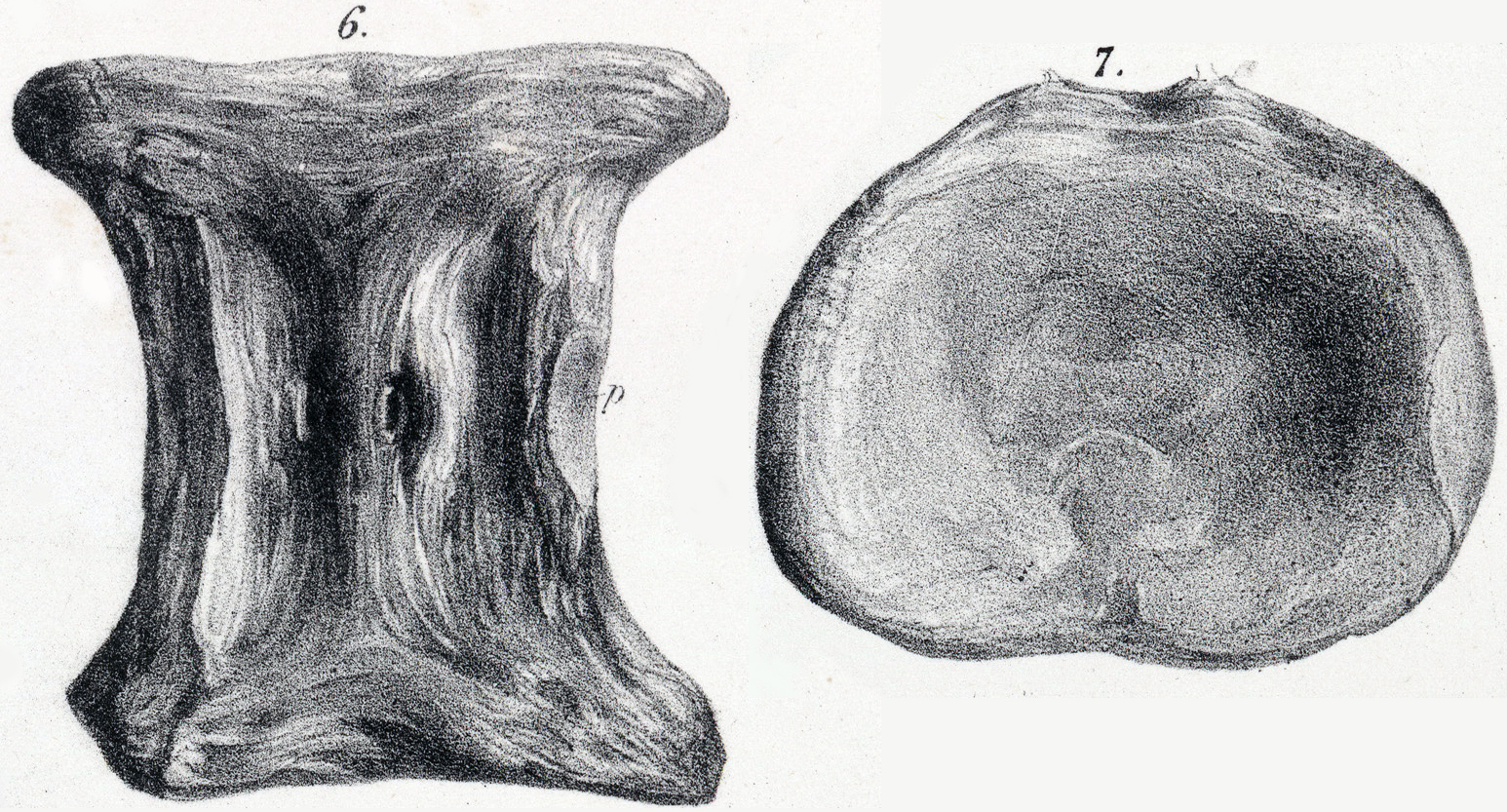
Vertebra of Plesiosaurus constrictus, which Cope assigned to Elasmosaurus

In the same 1869 publication wherein he named E. platyurus and E. orientalis, Cope assigned an additional species, E. constrictus, based on a partial centrum from a neck vertebra found in the Turonian-aged clay deposits at Steyning, Sussex, in the United Kingdom. It was described by the British paleontologist Richard Owen as Plesiosaurus constrictus in 1850; Owen named the species after the extremely narrow breadth of the vertebra between the pleurapophyses, or the processes that articulate between the ribs. He considered this to be partially an artifact of preservation, but could not understand how the compression affected only the central portion and not the articular ends of the centrum. Cope recognized this as a natural condition, and considered constrictus to be "a species of Elasmosaurus or an ally". In 1962 Welles considered P. constrictus to be a nomen dubium, given its fragmentary nature. Per Ove Persson retained it as valid in 1963, noting the longitudinal ridge on the sides of the centra as an elasmosaurid trait. In 1995 Nathalie Bardet and Pascal Godefroit also recognized it as an elasmosaurid, albeit indeterminate.

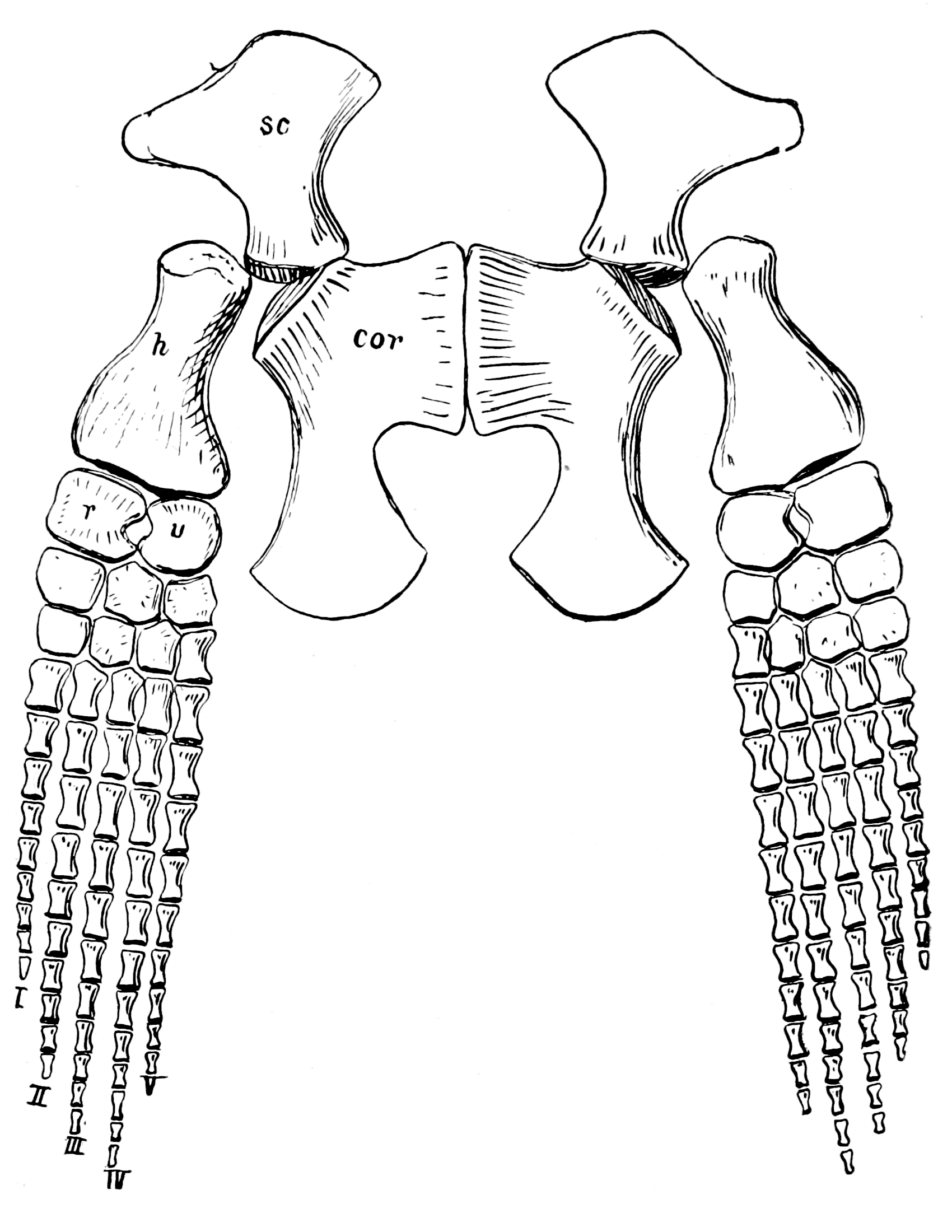
Pectoral girdle and front paddles of a juvenile elasmosaurid originally assigned to E. serpentinus

Cope discovered another elasmosaurid skeleton in 1876. He named it as a new species, E. serpentinus, in 1877, and differentiated it by the lack of compression in the rear neck vertebrae, the presence of few sessile ribs among the first few dorsals, and the presence of "weak angles" below the front tail vertebrae. Cope had also discovered another large skeleton that bore great resemblance to the known remains of E. orientalis from the black shale of the "Cretaceous bed No. 4"; he excavated it with the help of George B. Cledenning and Capt. Nicholas Buesen. In 1943 Welles removed E. serpentinus from Elasmosaurus, and placed it in a new genus, Hydralmosaurus. Subsequently, all Hydralmosaurus specimens were moved to Styxosaurus in 2016, rendering the former a nomen dubium. Williston published a figure of another E. serpentinus specimen in 1914; Elmer Riggs formally described it in 1939. Welles moved this specimen to the new genus and species Alzadasaurus riggsi in 1943. Kenneth Carpenter reassigned it to Thalassomedon haningtoni in 1999; Sachs, Johan Lindgren, and Benjamin Kear noted that the remains represented a juvenile and were significantly distorted, and preferred to retain it as a nomen dubium in 2016.

Subsequently, a series of 19 neck and back vertebrae from the Big Bend region of the Missouri – part of the Pierre Shale formation – were found by John H. Charles. Cope, upon receiving the bones at the Academy of Natural Sciences, considered them yet another species of Elasmosaurus. The vertebrae were, according to Cope, the shortest among members of the genus (approaching Cimoliasaurus in this condition), but he still considered them as belonging to Elasmosaurus due to their compressed form. He named it E. intermedius in 1894. However, in his 1906 revision of North American plesiosaurs, Williston regarded the vertebrae as "all more or less mutilated", and found no distinct differences between the remains of E. intermedius and E. platyurus. In 1952 Welles opined that, if E. intermedius was valid, "it must be referred to a pliosaurian genus"; however, he proceeded to label it a nomen dubium in 1962. Three shorter vertebrae found alongside E. intermedius, assigned by Cope to the new genus and species Embaphias circulosus, were also considered by Welles to be a nomen dubium in 1962.

Williston named a number of other new Elasmosaurus species in his 1906 revision. In 1874 he and Mudge discovered a specimen in Plum Creek, Kansas. While he initially assigned it in 1890 to a new species of Cimoliasaurus, C. snowii, he subsequently recognized the elasmosaurid nature of its humerus and coracoids. Thus, he renamed the species E. snowii. A second specimen, discovered by Elias West in 1890, was also assigned by him to E. snowii. In 1943 Welles moved E. snowii to its own genus, Styxosaurus, where the species has remained. However, the West specimen was assigned to Thalassiosaurus ischiadicus (see below) by Welles in 1952; Carpenter returned it to S. snowii in 1999. Williston also reassigned the species E. ischiadicus from the genus Polycotylus, where he had initially placed it when he named it in 1903. The type remains were discovered by him in the same 1874 expedition with Mudge. Williston assigned another specimen discovered by Mudge and H. A. Brous in 1876. In 1943 both specimens were assigned to the new genus Thalassiosaurus by Welles, who then assigned the latter to the new genus and species Alzadasaurus kansasensis in 1952. Glenn Storrs considered both to be indeterminate elasmosaurids in 1999; in the same year, Carpenter assigned both to Styxosaurus snowii.

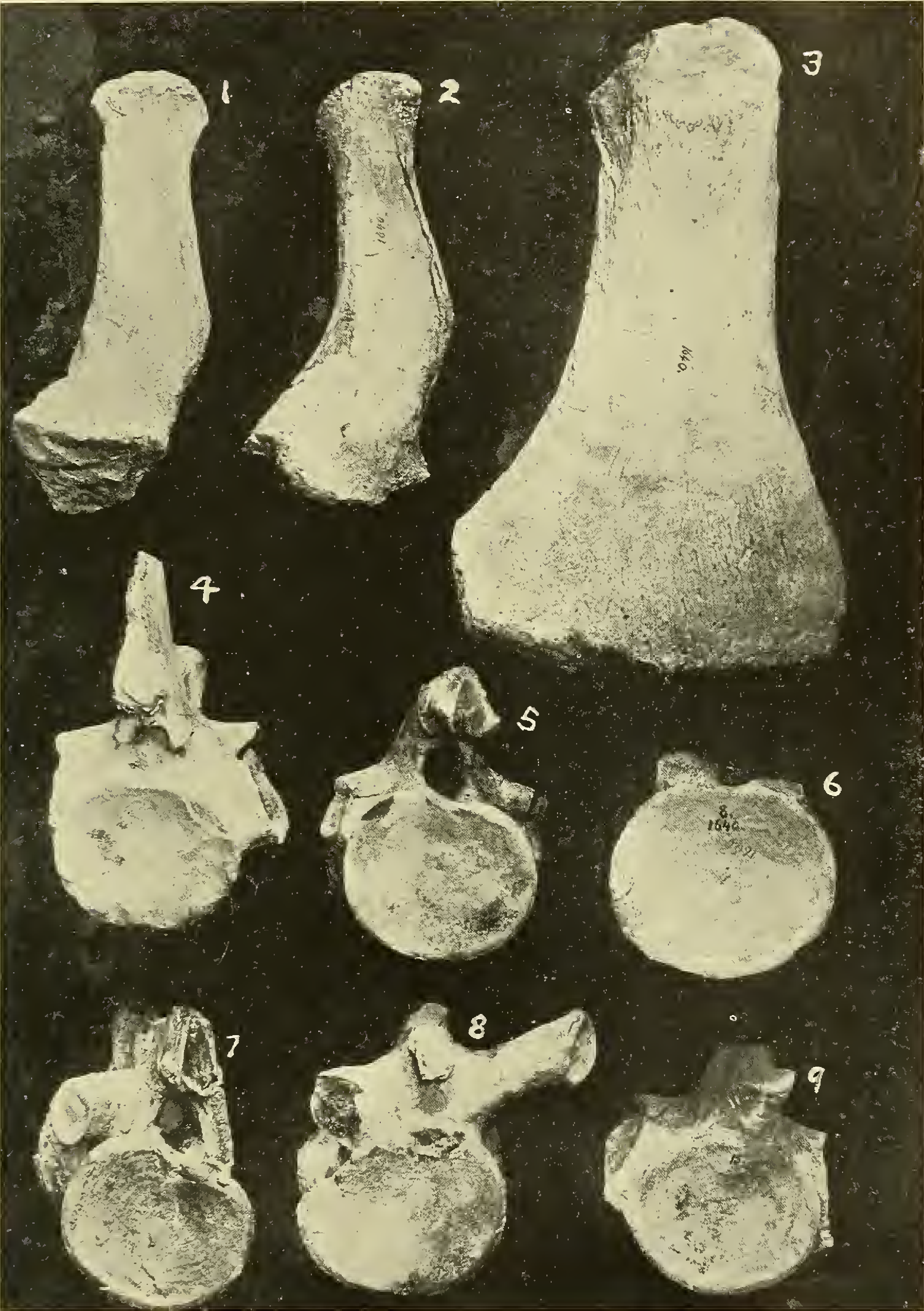
Remains of E. nobilis (now Styxosaurus snowii)

An elasmosaurid specimen was found by Handel Martin in Logan County, Kansas in 1889. Williston named this as a new species, E. (?) marshii. He bore reservations about its referral to the genus, and he recognized that it possibly pertained to another genus. In 1943 Welles moved E. (?) marshii to a genus of its own, Thalassonomosaurus; however, Carpenter sunk T. marshii into Styxosaurus snowii in 1999. Another species, E. nobilis, was named by Williston from very large remains discovered by Mudge in 1874 in Jewell County, Kansas. Welles named E. nobilis as a species of Thalassonomosaurus, T. nobilis, in 1943, but it too was considered to be part of S. snowii by Carpenter. Finally, two exceptionally large dorsal vertebrae collected by Charles Sternberg in 1895 were named E. sternbergii by Williston, but were considered indeterminate by Storrs. Williston mentioned three additional Elasmosaurus species, which he would figure and describe at a later date. He again made reference to a new species of Elasmosaurus, from Kansas, in 1908.

Several Russian species, based on poorly preserved vertebral remains, were assigned to Elasmosaurus by Nikolay N. Bogolubov in 1911. One was E. helmerseni, which was first described by W. Kiprijanoff in 1882 from Maloje Serdoba, Saratov, as Plesiosaurus helmerseni. Some material from Scania, Sweden, was assigned to P. helmerseni in 1885 by H. Schröder. Vertebral and limb remains from Kursk initially assigned by Kiprijanoff to P. helmerseni were also moved by Bogolubov to the new species E. kurskensis, which he considered to be "identical with Elasmosaurus or related to it". He also named E. orskensis, based on "very large" neck and tail vertebra remains from Konopljanka, Orenburg; and E. serdobensis, based on a single neck vertebra from Maloje Serdoba. However, the validity of all these species has been questioned. Welles considered E. kurskensis as an indeterminate plesiosaur in 1962. Persson noted in a 1959 review of the Swedish "E." helmerseni material that, while the species was probably closely related to Elasmosaurus proper, it was too fragmentary for this hypothesis to be assessed; he later remarked in 1963 that, regarding the latter three species, "their generic and specific definition is questionable", although he declined to specifically label them as invalid on account of not having seen the fossil material. Similarly, in 1999, Evgeniy Pervushov, Maxim Arkhangelsky, and Alexander Ivanov considered E. helmerseni to be an indeterminate elasmosaurid. In 2000 Storrs, Archangelsky, and Vladimir Efimov concurred with Welles on E. kurskensis, and labelled E. orskensis and E. serdobensis as indeterminate elasmosaurids.

Two additional Russian species were described by subsequent authors. Anatoly Riabinin described a single phalanx from a flipper in 1915 as E. (?) sachalinensis; the species was named after the island of Sakhalin, where N. N. Tikhonovich found it in 1909. However, this specimen cannot be identified more specifically than an indeterminate elasmosaurid, which was followed by Persson and Pervushov and colleagues. Storrs, Arkhangelsky, and Efimov were less specific, labelling it as an indeterminate plesiosaur; this classification was followed by Alexander Averianov and Vasilii Popov in 2005. Then, in 1916, Pavel A. Pravoslavlev named E. amalitskii from the Don River region, based on a specimen containing vertebrae, limb girdles, and limb bones. Persson considered it a valid species, and a relatively large member of the elasmosaurids; however, like E. (?) sachalinensis, Pervushov and colleagues considered E. amalitskii an indeterminate elasmosaurid.

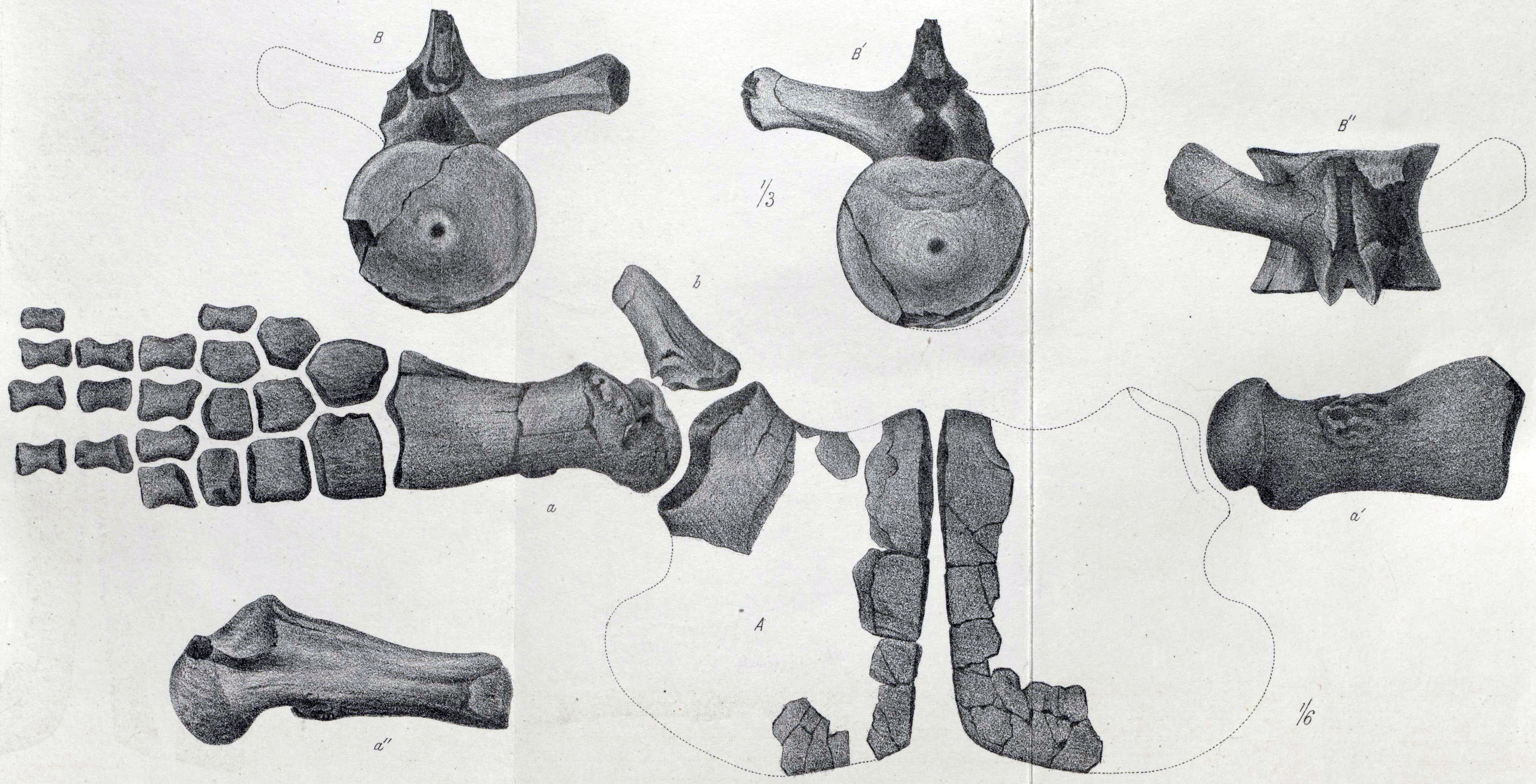
Remains of E. haasti (now Mauisaurus haasti)

In a 1918 review of the geographic distribution and evolution of Elasmosaurus, Pravoslavlev provisionally assigned three other previously named species to Elasmosaurus; his taxonomic opinions have not been widely followed. One of these was E. chilensis, based on the Chilean Plesiosaurus chilensis named from a single tail vertebra by Claude Gay in 1848. In a work published in 1889, Richard Lydekker assigned this species to Cimoliasaurus. Wilhelm Deecke moved chilensis to Pliosaurus in 1895, a classification which was acknowledged by Pravoslavlev. Edwin Colbert later assigned the type vertebra in 1949 to a pliosauroid, and also assigned other assigned remains to indeterminate elasmosauroids; the type vertebra was recognized as potentially belonging to Aristonectes parvidens by O'Gorman and colleagues in 2013. Another was E. haasti, originally Mauisaurus haasti, named by James Hector in 1874 based on remains found in New Zealand. Although its validity was supported for a considerable time, M. haasti is regarded as a nomen dubium as of 2017. Pravoslavlev recognized another species from New Zealand, E. hoodii, named by Owen in 1870 as Plesiosaurus hoodii based on a neck vertebra. Welles recognized it as a nomen dubium in 1962; Joan Wiffen and William Moisley concurred in a 1986 review of New Zealand plesiosaurs.

In 1949 Welles named a new species of Elasmosaurus, E. morgani. It was named from a well-preserved skeleton found in Dallas County, Texas. However, part of the specimen was accidentally thrown out during the relocation of the Southern Methodist University's paleontological collections. Welles recognized E. morgani's similarity to E. platyurus in its shoulder girdle, but maintained it as a separate species due to its shorter neck and more robust rear neck vertebrae. In 1997 Carpenter reconsidered the differences between the two species, and found them sufficient to place E. morgani in its own genus, which he named Libonectes. Despite its reassignment and the loss of its material, L. morgani is often considered an archetypal elasmosaurid. Data based on these lost elements were unquestionably accepted in subsequent phylogenetic analyses, until a redescription of the surviving elements was published by Sachs and Benjamin Kear in 2015.

Persson assigned another species to Elasmosaurus alongside his 1959 description of "E." helmerseni remains from Sweden, namely E. (?) gigas. It was based on Schröder's Pliosaurus (?) gigas, named in 1885 from two dorsals; one was found in Prussia, the other in Scania. While they were incomplete, Persson recognized that their proportions and the shape of their articular ends differed greatly from pliosauroids, and instead agreed well with elasmosaurids. Given that, at the time of Persson's writing, "there [was] nothing to contradict that they are nearest akin to Elasmosaurus", he assigned them to Elasmosaurus "with hesitation". Theodor Wagner had previously assigned gigas to Plesiosaurus in 1914. As of 2013, this questionable attribution remains unchanged. Another species from Russia, E. antiquus, was named by Dubeikovskii and Ochev in 1967 from the Kamsko-Vyatsky phosphorite quarry, but Pervushov and colleagues in 1999, followed by Storrs and colleagues in 2000, reinterpreted it as an indeterminate elasmosaurid.

== Classification ==
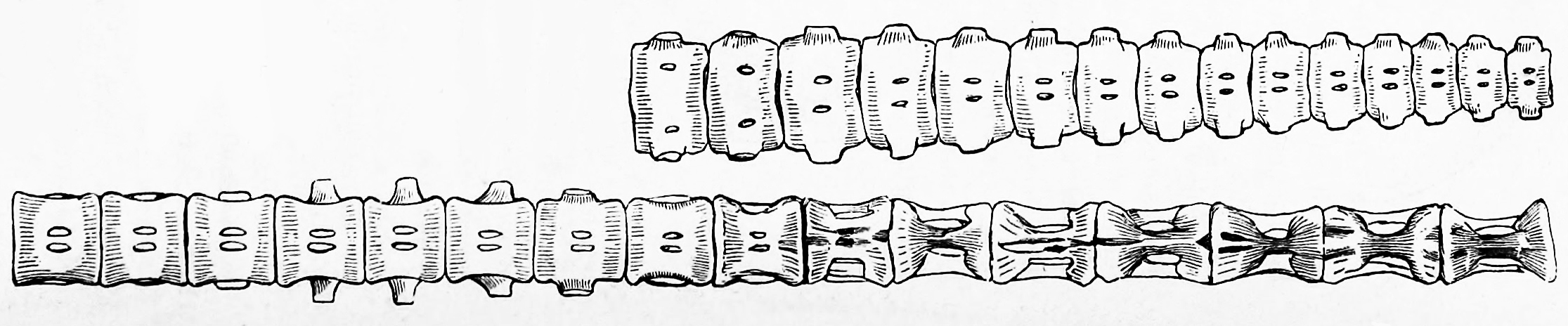
Neck and back vertebrae of Cimoliasaurus, above, and Elasmosaurus, figured by Cope, 1869

Though Cope had originally recognized Elasmosaurus as a plesiosaur, in an 1869 paper he placed it, with Cimoliasaurus and Crymocetus, in a new order of sauropterygian reptiles. He named the group Streptosauria, or "reversed lizards", due to the orientation of their individual vertebrae supposedly being reversed compared to what is seen in other vertebrate animals. He subsequently abandoned this idea in his 1869 description of Elasmosaurus, where he stated he had based it on Leidy's erroneous interpretation of Cimoliasaurus. In this paper, he also named the new family Elasmosauridae, containing Elasmosaurus and Cimoliasaurus, without comment. Within this family, he considered the former to be distinguished by a longer neck with compressed vertebrae, and the latter by a shorter neck with square, depressed vertebrae.

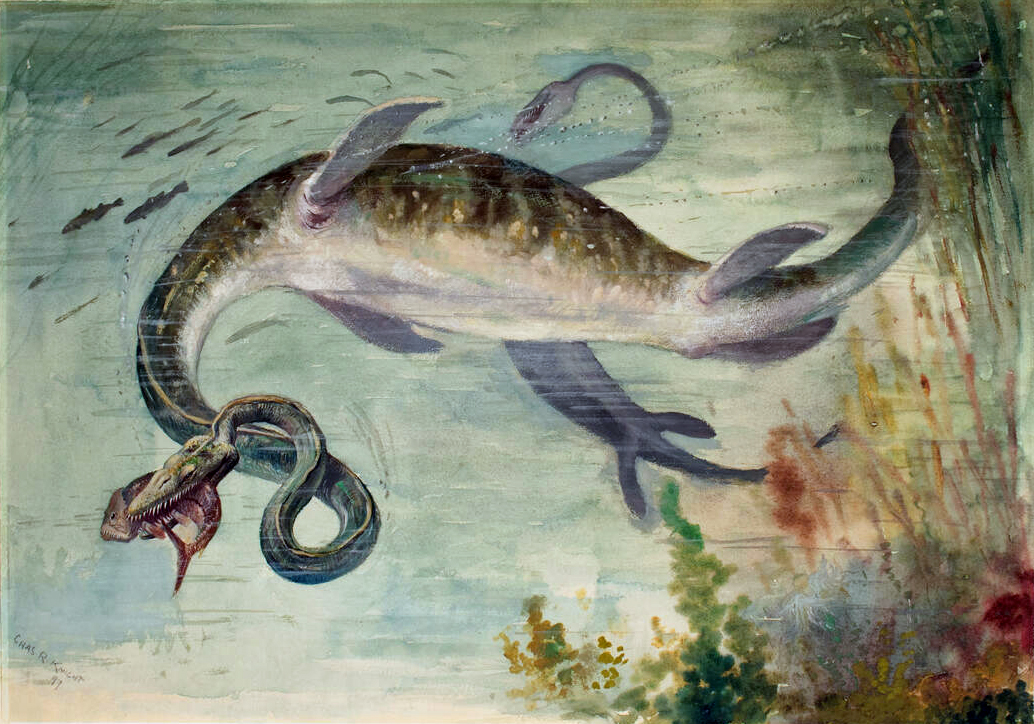
Outdated life restoration of two individuals with curled, snake-like necks, by Charles R. Knight, 1897

In subsequent years, Elasmosauridae came to be one of three groups in which plesiosaurs were classified, the others being the Pliosauridae and Plesiosauridae (sometimes merged into one group). Charles Andrews elaborated on differences between elasmosaurids and pliosaurids in 1910 and 1913. He characterized elasmosaurids by their long necks and small heads, as well as by their rigid and well-developed scapulae (but atrophied or absent clavicles and interclavicles) for forelimb-driven locomotion. Meanwhile, pliosaurids had short necks but large heads, and used hindlimb-driven locomotion. Although the placement of Elasmosaurus in the Elasmosauridae remained uncontroversial, opinions on the relationships of the family became variable over subsequent decades. Williston created a revised taxonomy of plesiosaurs in 1925.

In 1940 Theodore White published a hypothesis on the interrelationships between different plesiosaurian families. He considered Elasmosauridae to be closest to the Pliosauridae, noting their relatively narrow coracoids as well as their lack of interclavicles or clavicles. His diagnosis of the Elasmosauridae also noted the moderate length of the skull (i.e., a mesocephalic skull); the neck ribs having one or two heads; the scapula and coracoid contacting at the midline; the blunted rear outer angle of the coracoid; and the pair of openings (fenestrae) in the scapula–coracoid complex being separated by a narrower bar of bone compared to pliosaurids. The cited variability in the number of heads on the neck ribs arises from his inclusion of Simolestes to the Elasmosauridae, since the characteristics of "both the skull and shoulder girdle compare more favorably with Elasmosaurus than with Pliosaurus or Peloneustes." He considered Simolestes a possible ancestor of Elasmosaurus. Oskar Kuhn adopted a similar classification in 1961.

Modern life restoration

Welles took issue with White's classification in his 1943 revision of plesiosaurs, noting that White's characteristics are influenced by both preservation and ontogeny. He divided plesiosaurs into two superfamilies, the Plesiosauroidea and Pliosauroidea, based on neck length, head size, ischium length, and the slenderness of the humerus and femur (the propodialia). Each superfamily was further subdivided by the number of heads on the ribs, and the proportions of the epipodialia. Thus, elasmosaurids had long necks, small heads, short ischia, stocky propodialia, single-headed ribs, and short epipodialia. Pierre de Saint-Seine in 1955 and Alfred Romer in 1956 both adopted Welles' classification. In 1962 Welles further subdivided elasmosaurids based on whether they possessed pelvic bars formed from the fusion of the ischia, with Elasmosaurus and Brancasaurus being united in the subfamily Elasmosaurinae by their sharing of completely closed pelvic bars.

Carpenter's 1997 phylogenetic analysis of plesiosaurs challenged the traditional subdivision of plesiosaurs based on neck length. While polycotylids had previously been part of the Pliosauroidea, Carpenter moved polycotylids to become the sister group of the elasmosaurids based on cranial similarities, thus implying that polycotylids and pliosauroids evolved their short necks independently. The content of Elasmosauridae also received greater scrutiny. Since its initial assignment to the Elasmosauridae, the relationships of Brancasaurus had been considered well supported, and an elasmosaurid position was recovered by O'Keefe's 2004 analysis and Franziska Großmann's 2007 analysis. However, Ketchum and Benson's analysis instead included it in the Leptocleidia, and its inclusion in that group has remained consistent in subsequent analyses. Their analysis also moved Muraenosaurus to the Cryptoclididae, and Microcleidus and Occitanosaurus to the Plesiosauridae; Benson and Druckenmiller isolated the latter two in the group Microcleididae in 2014, and considered Occitanosaurus a species of Microcleidus. These genera had all previously been considered to be elasmosaurids by Carpenter, Großmann, and other researchers.

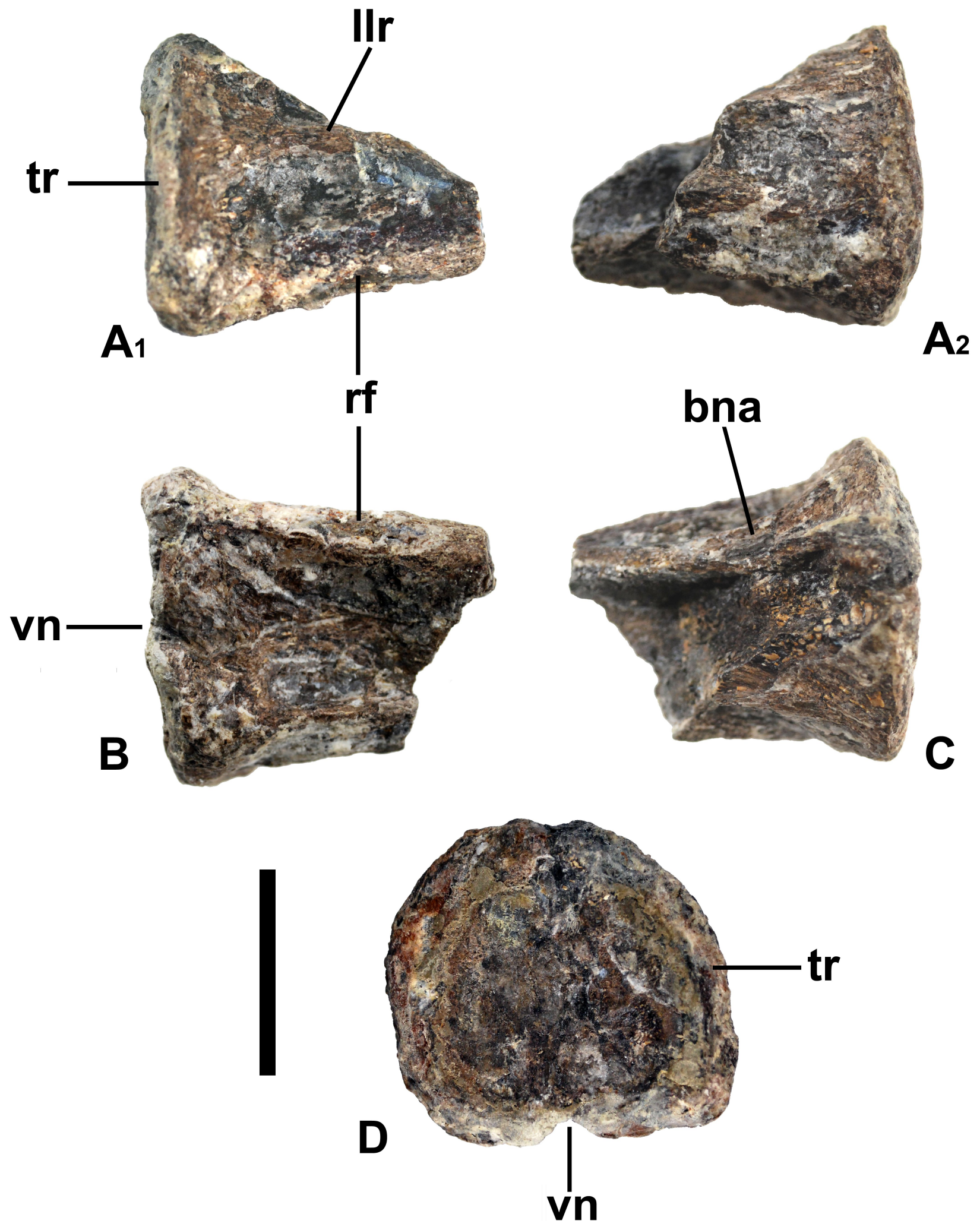
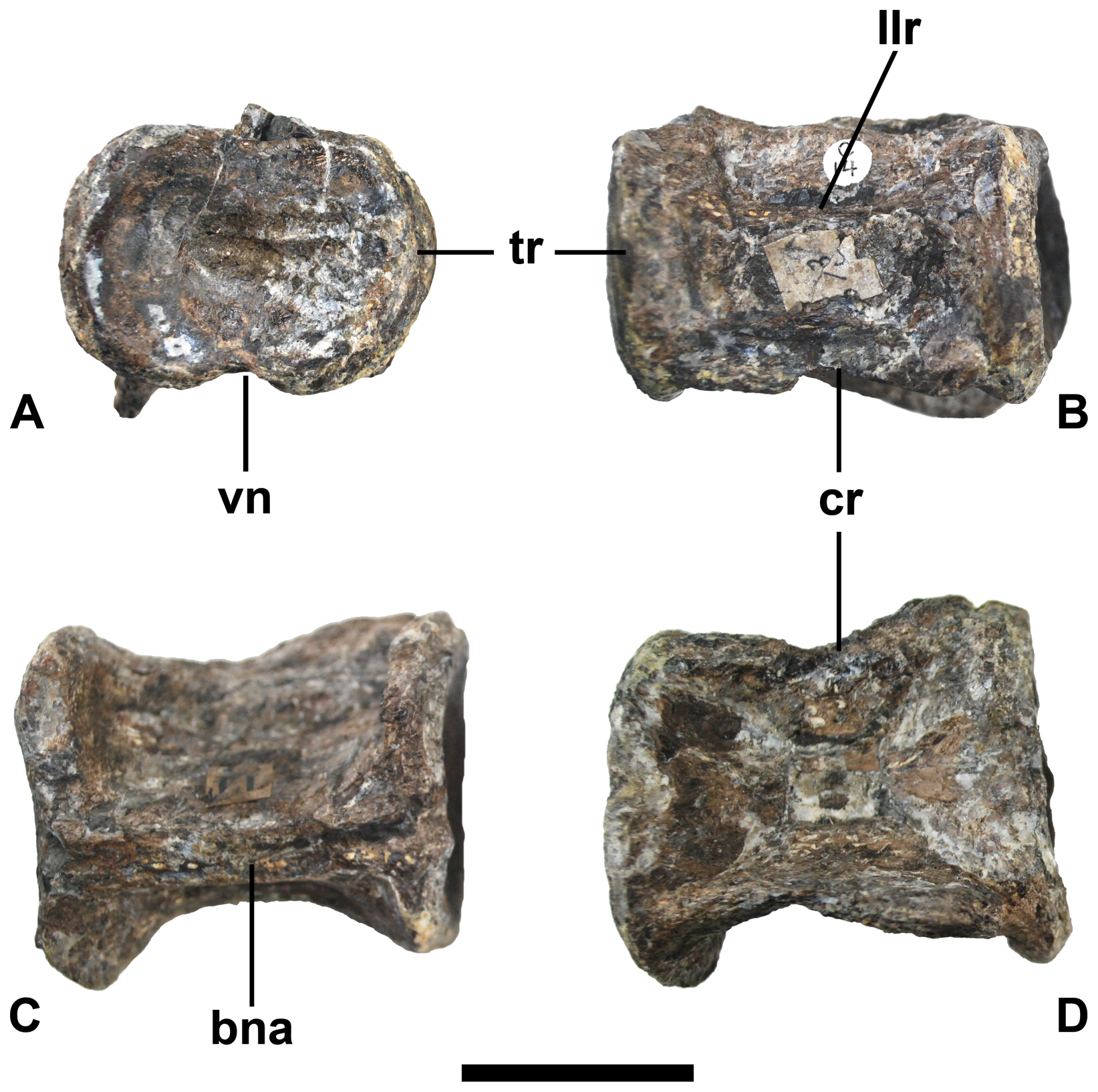
"Lost" incomplete vertebra, which, when it was rediscovered in 2013, increased the neck vertebra count to 72, a distinct feature of this genus (left), and a vertebra from the front of the neck, both in multiple views

Within the Elasmosauridae, Elasmosaurus itself has been considered a "wildcard taxon" with highly variable relationships. Carpenter's 1999 analysis suggested that Elasmosaurus was more basal (i.e. less specialized) than other elasmosaurids with the exception of Libonectes. In 2005 Sachs suggested that Elasmosaurus was closely related to Styxosaurus, and in 2008 Druckenmiller and Russell placed it as part of a polytomy with two groups, one containing Libonectes and Terminonatator, the other containing Callawayasaurus and Hydrotherosaurus. Ketchum and Benson's 2010 analysis included Elasmosaurus in the former group.

Benson and Druckenmiller's 2013 analysis (below, left) further removed Terminonatator from this group and placed it as one step more derived. In Rodrigo Otero's 2016 analysis based on a modification of the same dataset (below, right), Elamosaurus was the closest relative of Albertonectes, forming the Styxosaurinae with Styxosaurus and Terminonatator. Danielle Serratos, Druckenmiller, and Benson could not resolve the position of Elasmosaurus in 2017, but they noted that Styxosaurinae would be a synonym of Elasmosaurinae if Elasmosaurus did fall within the group. In 2020, O'Gorman formally synonymized Styxosaurinae with Elasmosaurinae based on the inclusion of Elasmosaurus within the group, and also provided a list of diagnostic characteristics for the clade.

Topology A: Benson et al. (2013)

- - - Cryptoclididae
    - Leptocleidia
      - Leptocleididae
      - Polycotylidae
  - Elasmosauridae
    - Thalassomedon
    - - - Libonectes
        - Elasmosaurus
      - - Terminonatator
        - - - Styxosaurus
            - Hydrotherosaurus
          - - Callawayasaurus
            - - Eromangasaurus
              - - Kaiwhekea
                - Aristonectes

Topology B: Otero (2016), with clade names following O'Gorman (2020)

- Cryptoclidia
  - Cryptoclididae
  - Xenopsaria
    - Leptocleidia
      - Leptocleididae
      - Polycotylidae
    - Elasmosauridae
      - Eromangasaurus
      - - Callawayasaurus
        - - Libonectes
          - - - Tuarangisaurus
              - Thalassomedon
            - - Specimen CM Zfr 115
              - - Hydrotherosaurus
                - Futabasaurus
            - - Aristonectinae
                - Kaiwhekea
                - - Alexandronectes
                  - - Morturneria
                    - Aristonectes
              - Elasmosaurinae
                - Terminonatator
                - - - Elasmosaurus
                    - Albertonectes
                  - Styxosaurus

== Paleobiology ==
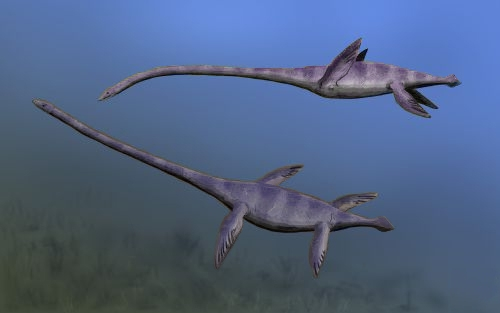
Restoration showing two individuals swimming with straight necks

Elasmosaurids were fully adapted to life in the ocean, with streamlined bodies and long paddles that indicate they were active swimmers. The unusual body structure of elasmosaurids would have limited the speed at which they could swim, and their paddles may have moved in a manner similar to the movement of oars rowing, and due to this, could not twist and were thus held rigidly. Plesiosaurs were even believed to have been able to maintain a constant and high body temperature (homeothermy), allowing for sustained swimming.

A 2015 study concluded that locomotion was mostly done by the fore-flippers while the hind-flippers functioned in maneuverability and stability; a 2017 study concluded that the hind-flippers of plesiosaurs produced 60% more thrust and had 40% more efficiency when moving in harmony with the fore-flippers. The paddles of plesiosaurs were so rigid and specialized for swimming that they could not have come on land to lay eggs like sea turtles. Therefore, they probably gave live-birth (viviparity) to their young like some species of sea snakes. Evidence for live-birth in plesiosaurs is provided by the fossil of an adult Polycotylus with a single fetus inside.

Elasmosaurid remains provide some evidence they were preyed upon. A humerus of an unidentified subadult elasmosaurid was found with bite marks matching the teeth of the shark Cretoxyrhina, while a crushed Eromangasaurus skull has tooth-marks matched to the pliosaur Kronosaurus.

=== Neck movement and function ===
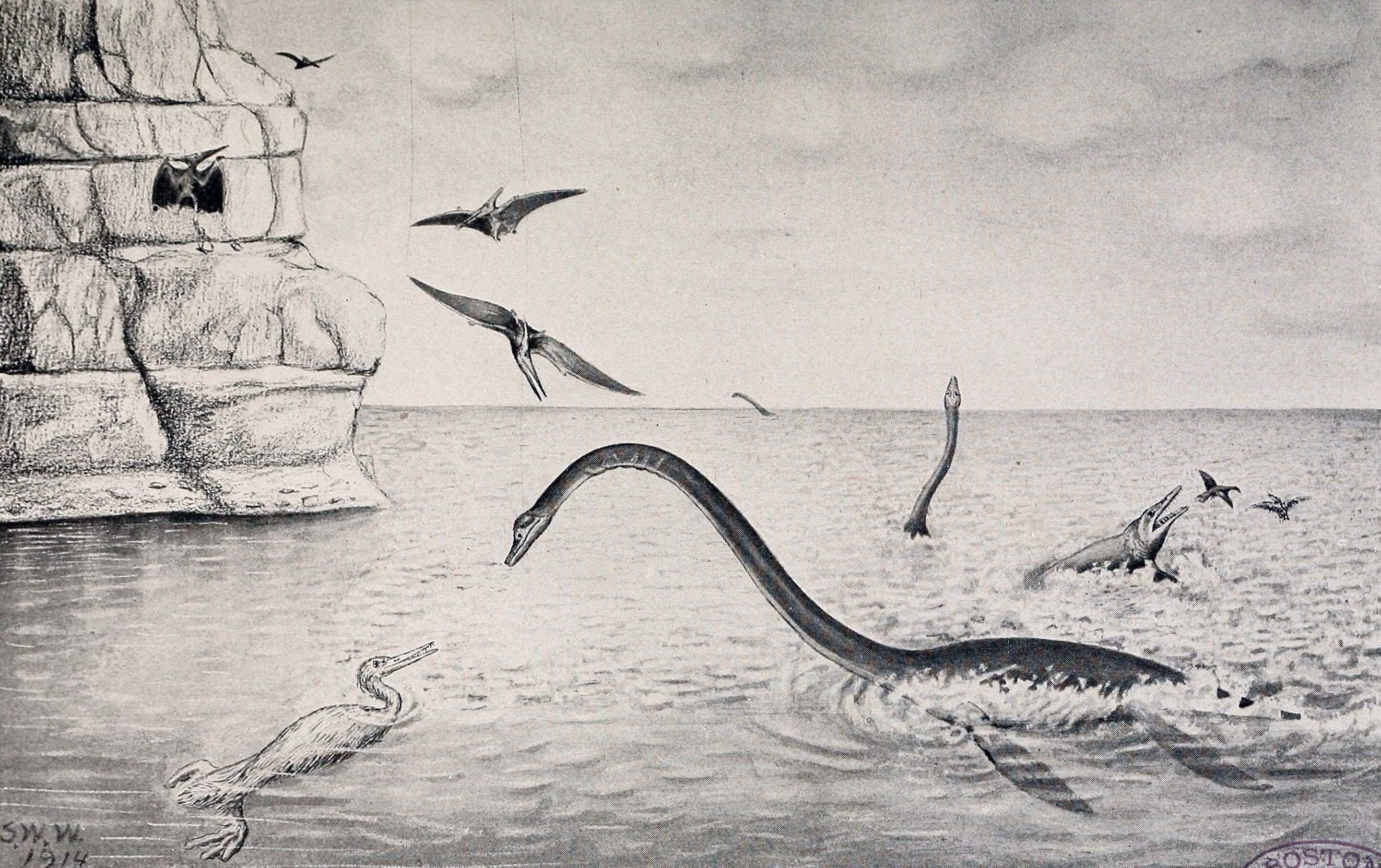
Outdated restoration of Elasmosaurus showing its neck raised above water, by Samuel Wendell Williston, 1914

Cope, in 1869, compared the build and habits of Elasmosaurus with those of a snake. Although he suggested that the vertebral column of the trunk did not allow for much vertical movement due to the elongated neural spines which nearly form a continuous line with little space between adjacent vertebrae, he envisaged the neck and tail to have been much more flexible: "The snake-like head was raised high in the air, or depressed at the will of the animal, now arched swan-like preparatory to a plunge after a fish, now stretched in repose on the water or deflexed in exploring the depths below".

Although followed by many common media depictions, more recent research showed that Elasmosaurus was incapable of raising anything more than its head above the water. The weight of its long neck placed the center of gravity behind the front flippers. Thus, Elasmosaurus could have raised its head and neck above the water only when in shallow water, where it could rest its body on the bottom. Also, the weight of the neck, the limited musculature, and the limited movement between the vertebrae would have prevented Elasmosaurus from raising its head and neck very high. The head and shoulders of the Elasmosaurus probably acted as a rudder. If the animal moved the anterior part of the body in a certain direction, it would cause the rest of the body to move in that direction. Thus, Elasmosaurus would have been unable to swim in one direction while moving its head and neck either horizontally or vertically in a different direction.

Chart showing several hypotheses on the neck flexibility of elasmosaurids, using Elasmosaurus as a model. A – Swan-like neck held upright, B – Ramrod straight neck held out directly in front, C – Downward curve for feeding on benthic prey items, D – Wide horizontal curve, E – Serpentine undulating position. Neck positions B–E would have been within the estimated neck flexibility ranges.

One study found that the necks of elasmosaurids were capable of 75–177˚ of ventral movement, 87–155° of dorsal movement, and 94–176° of lateral movement, depending on the amount of tissue between the vertebrae, which probably increased in rigidness towards the back of the neck. The researchers concluded that lateral and vertical arches and shallow S-shaped curves were feasible in contrast to the "swan-like" S-shape neck postures that required more than 360° of vertical flexion.

The exact function of the neck of elasmosaurids is unknown, though it may have been important for hunting. It has also been suggested that the long necks of plesiosaurs served as a snorkel and allowed them to breathe air while the body remained underwater. This is disputed as there would be large hydrostatic pressure differences, particularly for the extremely long-necked elasmosaurids. The neck anatomy of elasmosaurids was capable of making a gentle slope to allow them to breathe at the surface but would have required them to engage in energy-expensive swimming at the sub-surface. In addition, the longer neck would also have increased dead space, and the animals may have required larger lungs. The neck could have had other vulnerabilities, for example being a target for predators.

Simulation of water flow on 3D models showed that more elongated necks, such as those of elasmosaurids, did not increase drag force while swimming compared to shorter necked plesiosaurs. On the other hand, bending the neck sideways did increase drag force, more so in forms with very long necks. Another study found the long necks of elasmosaurs would normally increase drag during forward swimming but this was cancelled out by their large torsos, and hence large body sizes may have facilitated the evolution of longer necks.

=== Feeding ===
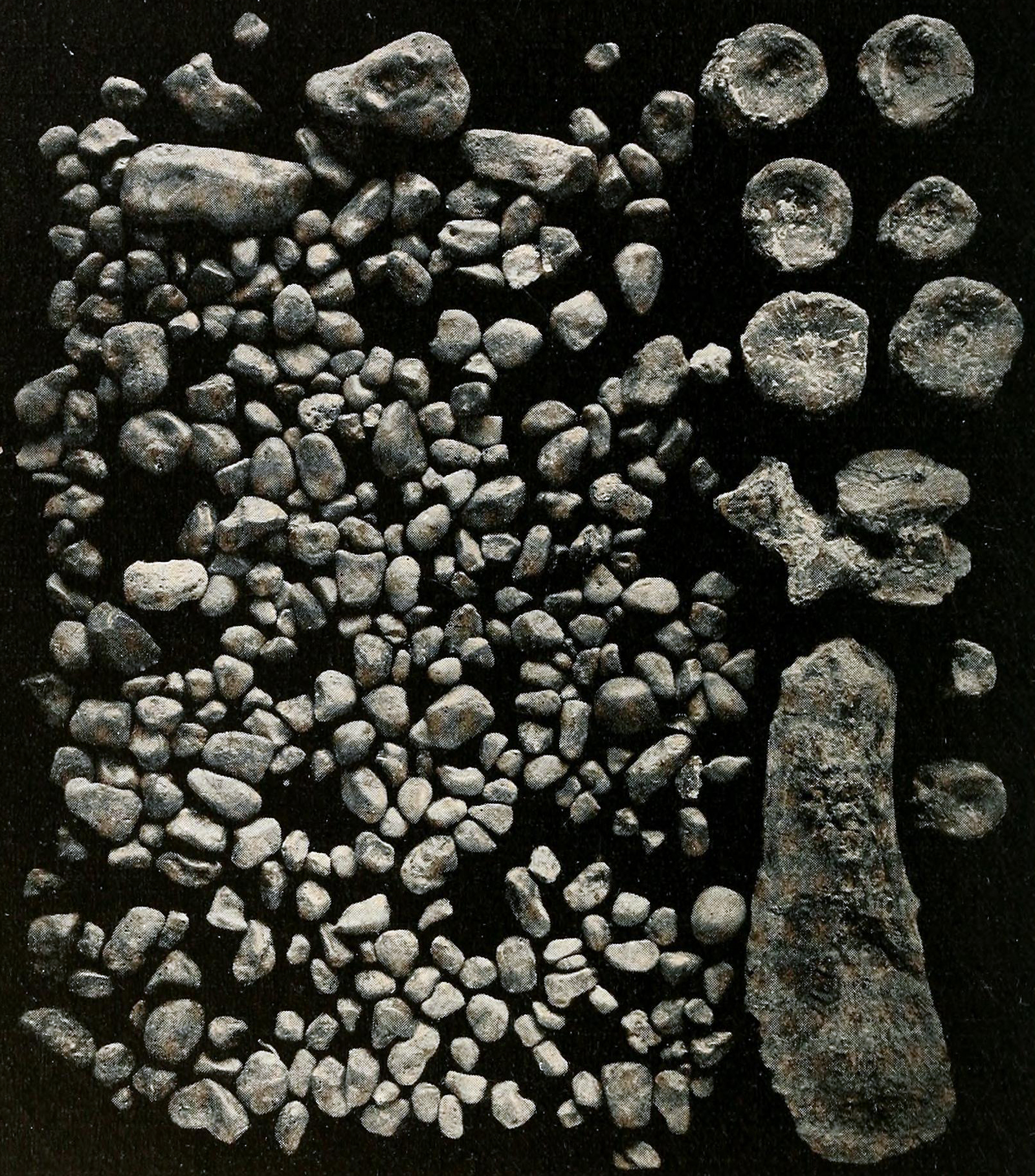
Gastroliths and bones (right) of an undetermined plesiosaur from Kansas

In 1869 Cope noted that scales and teeth of six species of fish had been discovered directly beneath the vertebrae of the Elasmosaurus holotype, and theorized that these fish would have had formed the diet of the animal. From these remains, Cope named a new species of barracuda, Sphyraena carinata.

The flexion ranges of Elasmosaurus necks would have allowed the animal to employ a number of hunting methods including "benthic grazing", which would have involved swimming close to the bottom and using the head and neck to dig for prey on the sea floor. Elasmosaurids may also have been active hunters in the pelagic zone, retracting their necks to launch a strike or using side-swipe motions to stun or kill prey with their laterally projected teeth (like sawsharks). It has also been suggested that the predatory abilities of elasmosaurids have been underestimated; their large skulls, big jaw-muscles, strong jaws, and long teeth indicate they could prey on animals between 30 centimeters (12 in) and 2 meters (6.6 ft) long, as indicated by stomach contents including those of sharks, fish, mosasaurs, and cephalopods.

It is possible that Elasmosaurus and its kin stalked schools of fish, concealing themselves below and moving the head slowly up as they approached. The eyes of the animal were at the top of the head and allowed them to see directly upward. This stereoscopic vision would have helped it to find small prey. Hunting from below would also have been possible, with prey silhouetted in the sunlight while concealed in the dark waters below. Elasmosaurids probably ate small bony fish and Cephalopods, as their small, non-kinetic skulls would have limited the size of the prey they could eat. Also, with their long, slender teeth adapted for seizing prey and not tearing, elasmosaurids most certainly swallowed their prey whole.

Although elasmosaurids are commonly found with several gastroliths, Elamosaurus has only been found uncontroversially with a pebble lodged in the neural arch of one of its hindmost tail-vertebrae. A specimen of the closely related Styxosaurus contained fragmented fish bones and stones in the abdominal region behind the pectoral girdle. The fish remains were identified as Enchodus and other clupeomorph fish. The stones match rock from 600 kilometers (370 mi) away from where the specimen was found. Several different functions have been proposed for gastroliths, including aiding in digestion, mixing food content, mineral supplementation, and storage and buoyancy control.

== Paleoecology ==
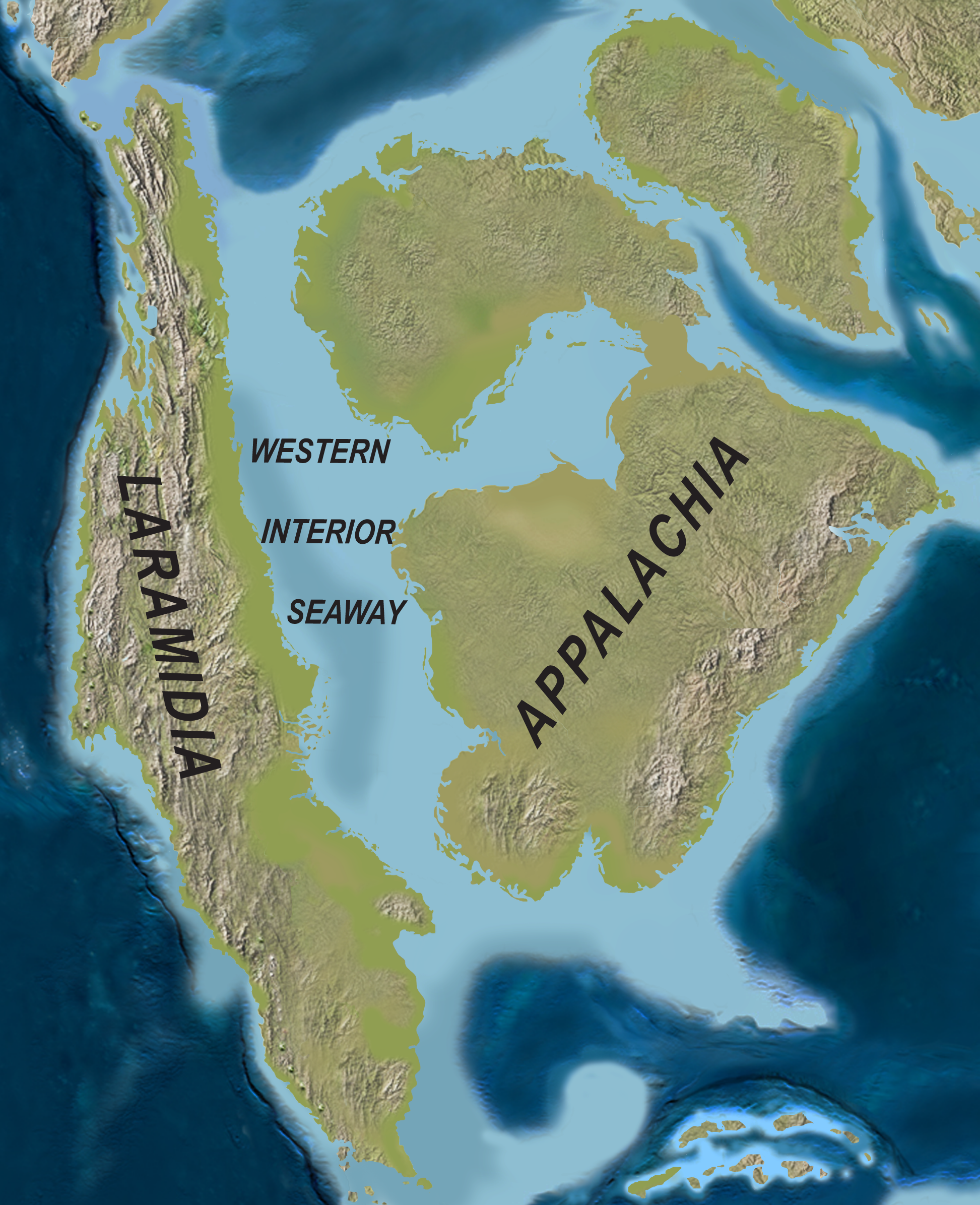
Map of the Western Interior Seaway during the Late Cretaceous about 80 million years ago

Elasmosaurus is known from the Sharon Springs Member of the Campanian-age Upper Cretaceous Pierre Shale formation of western Kansas, which dates to about 80.64 to 77 million years ago in this region. The Pierre Shale represents a period of marine deposition from the Western Interior Seaway, a shallow continental sea that submerged much of central North America during the Cretaceous. At its largest, the Western Interior Seaway stretched from the Rockies east to the Appalachians, some 1,000 kilometers (620 mi) wide. At its deepest, it may have been only 800 or 900 meters (2,600 or 3,000 ft) deep. Two great continental watersheds drained into it from east and west, diluting its waters and bringing resources in eroded silt that formed shifting river delta systems along its low-lying coasts. There was little sedimentation on the eastern margin of the Seaway; the western margin accumulated a thick pile of sediments eroded from the western land mass. The western shore was thus highly variable, depending on variations in sea level and sediment supply.

The soft, muddy sea floor probably received very little sunlight, but it teemed with life due to steady rains of organic debris from plankton and other organisms farther up the water column. The bottom was dominated by large Inoceramus clams, which were covered with oysters; there was little biodiversity. Clam shells would have accumulated over the centuries in layers under the sea floor's surface, and would have provided shelter for small fish. Other invertebrates known to have lived in this sea include various species of rudists, crinoids and cephalopods (including squids and ammonites).

Large fish known to have inhabited the sea include the bony fishes Pachyrhizodus, Enchodus, Cimolichthys, Saurocephalus, Saurodon, Gillicus, Ichthyodectes, Xiphactinus, Protosphyraena and Martinichthys; and the sharks Cretoxyrhina, Cretolamna, Scapanorhynchus, Pseudocorax and Squalicorax. In addition to Elasmosaurus, other marine reptiles present include fellow plesiosaurs Libonectes, Styxosaurus, Thalassomedon, Terminonatator, Polycotylus, Brachauchenius, Dolichorhynchops and Trinacromerum; the mosasaurs Mosasaurus, Halisaurus, Prognathodon, Tylosaurus, Ectenosaurus, Globidens, Clidastes, Platecarpus and Plioplatecarpus; and the sea turtles Archelon, Protostega, Porthochelys and Toxochelys. The flightless aquatic bird Hesperornis also made its home there. The pterosaurs Pteranodon and Nyctosaurus, and the bird Ichthyornis, are also known far from land.

== See also ==
- List of plesiosaur genera
- Timeline of plesiosaur research
