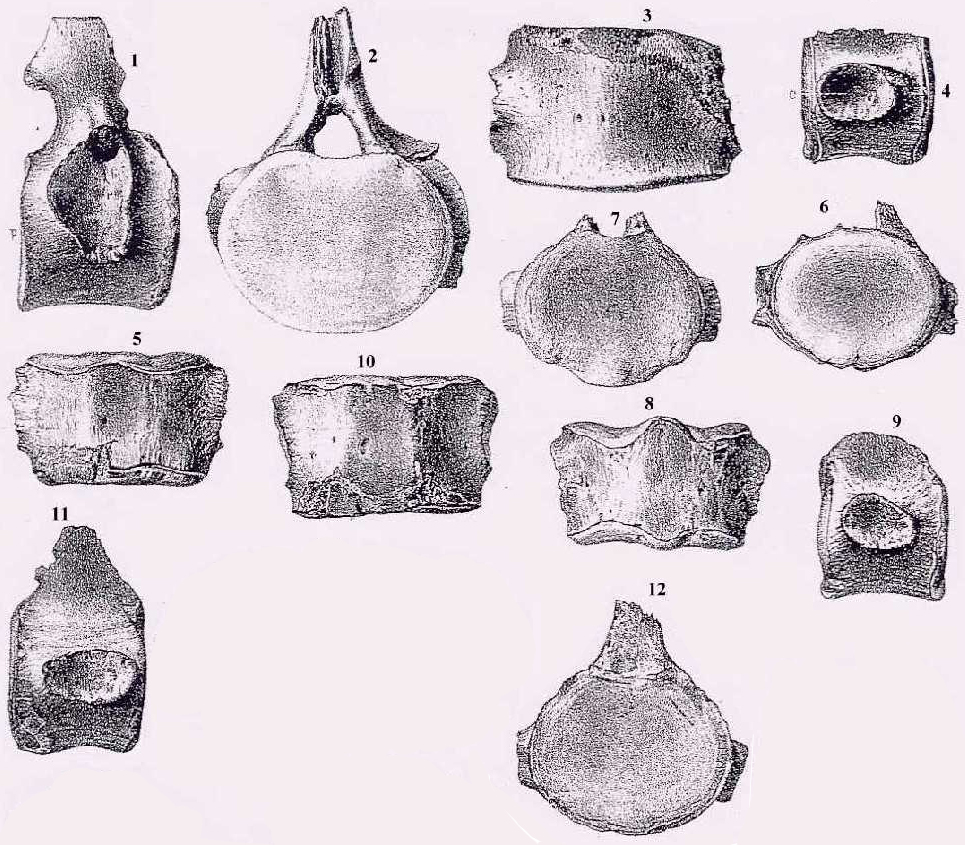
- Holotype vertebrae of D. vestutus

Scientific classification
- Kingdom: Animalia
- Phylum: Chordata
- Class: Reptilia
- Superorder: †Sauropterygia
- Order: †Plesiosauria
- Suborder: †Pliosauroidea
- Family: †Pliosauridae
- Subfamily: †Brachaucheninae
- Genus: †Discosaurus; Leidy, 1851

Type species
- †Discosaurus vestutus Leidy, 1851

= Discosaurus =

Discosaurus Temporal range: Late Cretaceous, Santonian

Extinct genus of reptiles

Discosaurus is an extinct genus of plesiosaur from the Santonian of Alabama and Mississippi. One species is known, which is D. vestutus.

== Discovery and naming ==
The holotype, eleven vertebrae, was discovered by Joseph Jones in Alabama and Mississippi, and was named and described as Discosaurus vestutus by Leidy (1851). Two more specimens from New Jersey were described and were later re-classified as belonging to Cimoliasaurus magnus by Leidy (1870b).

Leidy (1870b) later argued that Discosaurus was the same animal as Elasmosaurus.

== See also ==
- Timeline of plesiosaur research
- List of plesiosaurs
