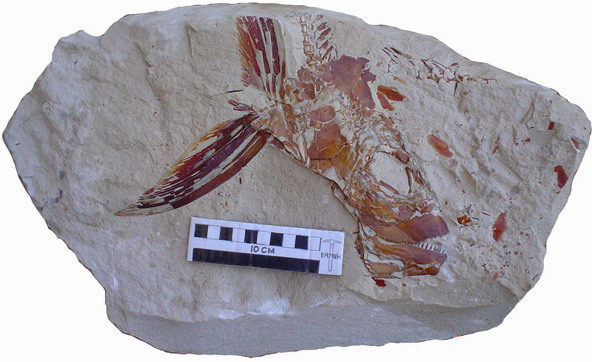
- Holotype of P. harranaensis

Scientific classification
- Domain: Eukaryota
- Kingdom: Animalia
- Phylum: Chordata
- Class: Actinopterygii
- Order: †Ichthyodectiformes
- Family: †Ichthyodectidae
- Genus: †Postredectes; Kaddumi, 2009

Type species
- †Postredectes harranaensis Kaddumi, 2009

= Postredectes =

Postredectes Temporal range: Maastrichtian ~66.5–66.1 Ma

Extinct genus of ray-finned fishes

Postredectes (meaning "last ichthyodectid") is an extinct genus of ichthyodectid ray-finned fish from the Late Cretaceous Muwaqqar Chalk-Marl Formation of Jordan. The type species is P. harranaensis.

== Discovery and naming ==
The holotype, consisting of the skull, pectoral fins, five cervical vertebrae and several scales, was mined from the chalk deposits at Wadi Harrana, Jordan where a lagerstätte known as the Muwaqqar Chalk-Marl Formation is present.

The specimen was studied by Jordanian palaeontologist Hani Faig Kaddumi, who created the species Postredectes harranaensis for the specimen in 2009.

== Description ==
The skull of Postredectes was around 17 centimetres (6.7 in) long, suggesting the entire animal reached around 1.5 metres (4.9 ft) long.

Postredectes is characterized by the absence of large premaxillary tusks, and the premaxillary, maxillary and mandibular teeth were sharp and equipped with two keels, and occupied sockets in both the premaxilla and the maxilla. The mandibular teeth were also three times longer than those present in the premaxilla and maxilla.
