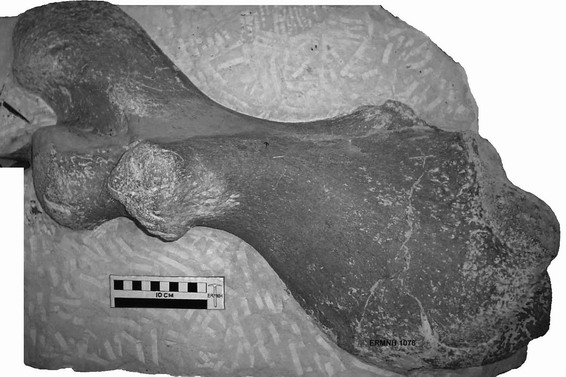
- Fossil humerus

Scientific classification
- Domain: Eukaryota
- Kingdom: Animalia
- Phylum: Chordata
- Class: Reptilia
- Order: Testudines
- Suborder: Cryptodira
- Superfamily: Chelonioidea
- Family: Cheloniidae
- Genus: †Gigantatypus; Kaddumi, 2006
- Species: †G. salahi

Binomial name
- †Gigantatypus salahi Kaddumi, 2006

= Gigantatypus =

Gigantatypus Temporal range: Late Maastrichtian

Extinct genus of turtles

Gigantatypus is an extinct late Maastrichtian sea turtle that lived in the southern regions of the Tethys Ocean about 100–120 kilometres (62–75 mi) off the north eastern margins of Cretaceous Africa immediately before the Cretaceous–Paleogene extinction events . Fossil remains of Gigantatypus are so far only represented in sediments from the Muwaqqar Chalk-Marl Formation of Jordan. Estimated at over 3.5 metres (11 ft) in length, members of this genus reached remarkably large proportions equivalent to that of or possibly even exceeding Archelon Wieland, 1896, considered as the largest marine turtles to ever roam the oceans of the world. Although Gigantatypus apparently did not survive the K/T boundary, which also was the fate of other gigantic marine turtles such as protostegids, other genera of Cheloniidae, though significantly smaller, survived the mass extinction and continued on until the present day.
