= Rarosaurus =

Rarosaurus Temporal range: Late Maastrichtian, 66.5-66.1 Ma

Scientific classification
- Kingdom: Animalia
- Phylum: Chordata
- Class: Reptilia
- Genus: †Rarosaurus; Kaddumi, 2009
- Species: †R. singularis

Binomial name
- †Rarosaurus singularis Kaddumi, 2009

Extinct genus of reptiles

Rarosaurus is an extinct genus of marine reptile that lived during the Late Cretaceous. It contains one valid species, R. singularis, and it was found in the Muwaqqar Chalk Marl Formation of Jordan.

== Discovery and naming ==
The holotype, a partial rostrum with teeth, was discovered in the latest Maastrichtian-aged Muwaqqar Chalk Marl Formation of Jordan. Hani Faig Kaddumi first mentioned this specimen in 2006, and then named and described it in 2009. There is some controversy that suggests that R. singularis is be classified to be a crocodylomorph.

The generic name Rarosaurus, meaning "rare lizard", is attributed to the paucity of plesiosaur fossils where it was found, while the specific name singularis refers to the type specimen of Rarosaurus being possibly the only plesiosaur specimen found from the area.

== Description ==
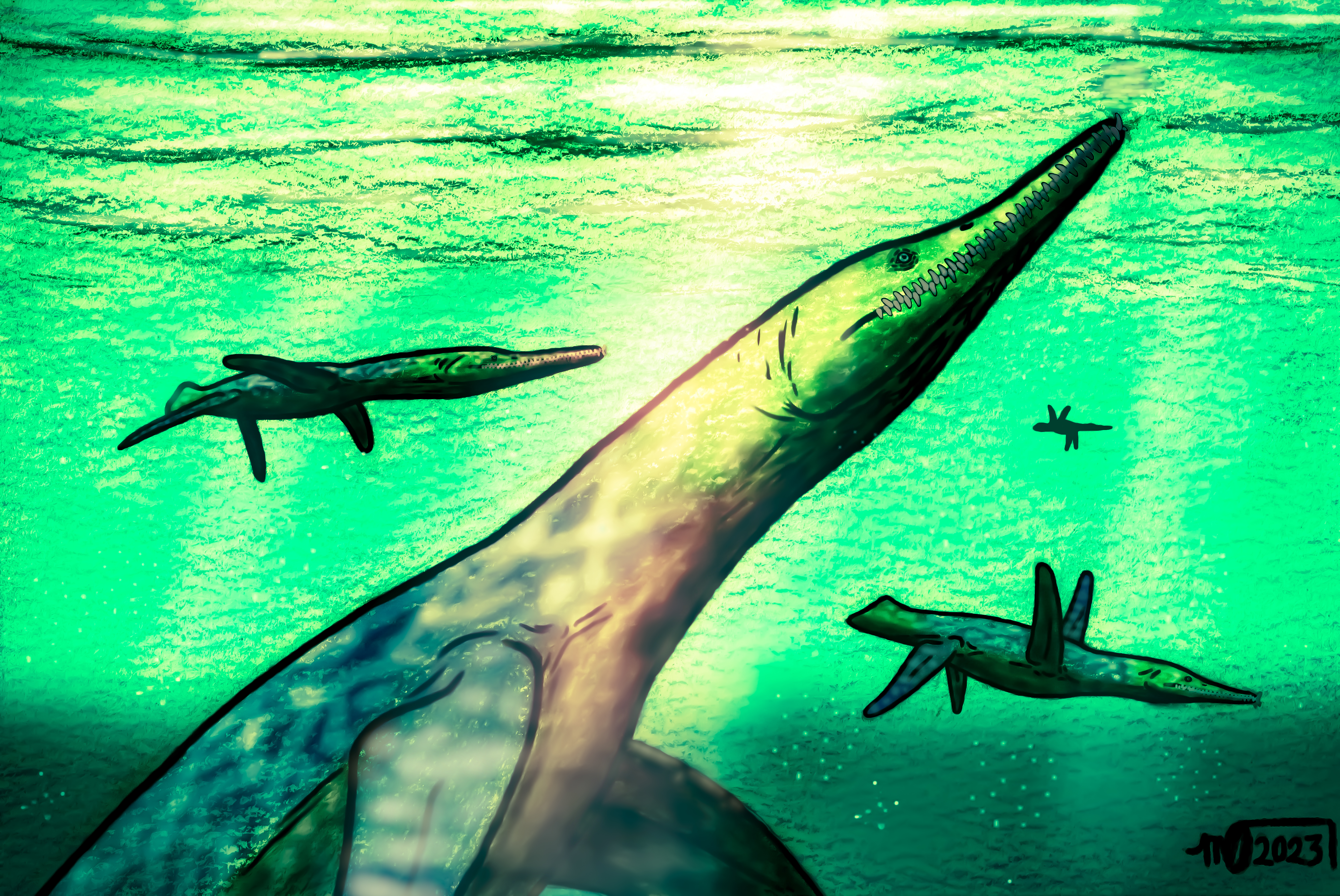
Reconstruction of Rarosaurus singularis as a polycotylid.

Rarosaurus is known from the rostral portion of a fossil skull, which is well preserved and bears teeth. The fossil is about twenty centimetres long and very elongate. The surface of the bone is rugose, marked by small holes and grooves. The teeth are relatively short and conical; the first tooth in the jaw protrudes far forward.

If the taxon is indeed a plesiosaur, it is notable for being the latest-surviving polycotylid and is currently the only one from the late Maastrichtian. However, Alhalabi and colleagues questioned its identity as a plesiosaur in 2024, since the known traits of Rarosaurus are actually typical of crocodylomorphs based on its "external bone ornamentation, tooth arrangement and implantation".
