= Muwaqqar Chalk-Marl Formation =

Geologic formation in Jordan

- Stratigraphic range: Maastrichtian to late Paleocene
- Type: Geological formation
- Underlies: Um Al'Rijam Chert-Limestone Formation
- Overlies: Alhisa Phosphorite Formation

Lithology
- Primary: Chalk, marl
- Other: Oil shales

Location
- Coordinates: 31.7°N 36.5°E
- Approximate paleocoordinates: 14.9°N 29.8°E
- Country: Jordan

Type section
- Named for: Al-Muwaqqar
- Named by: M. Masri
- Year defined: 1963
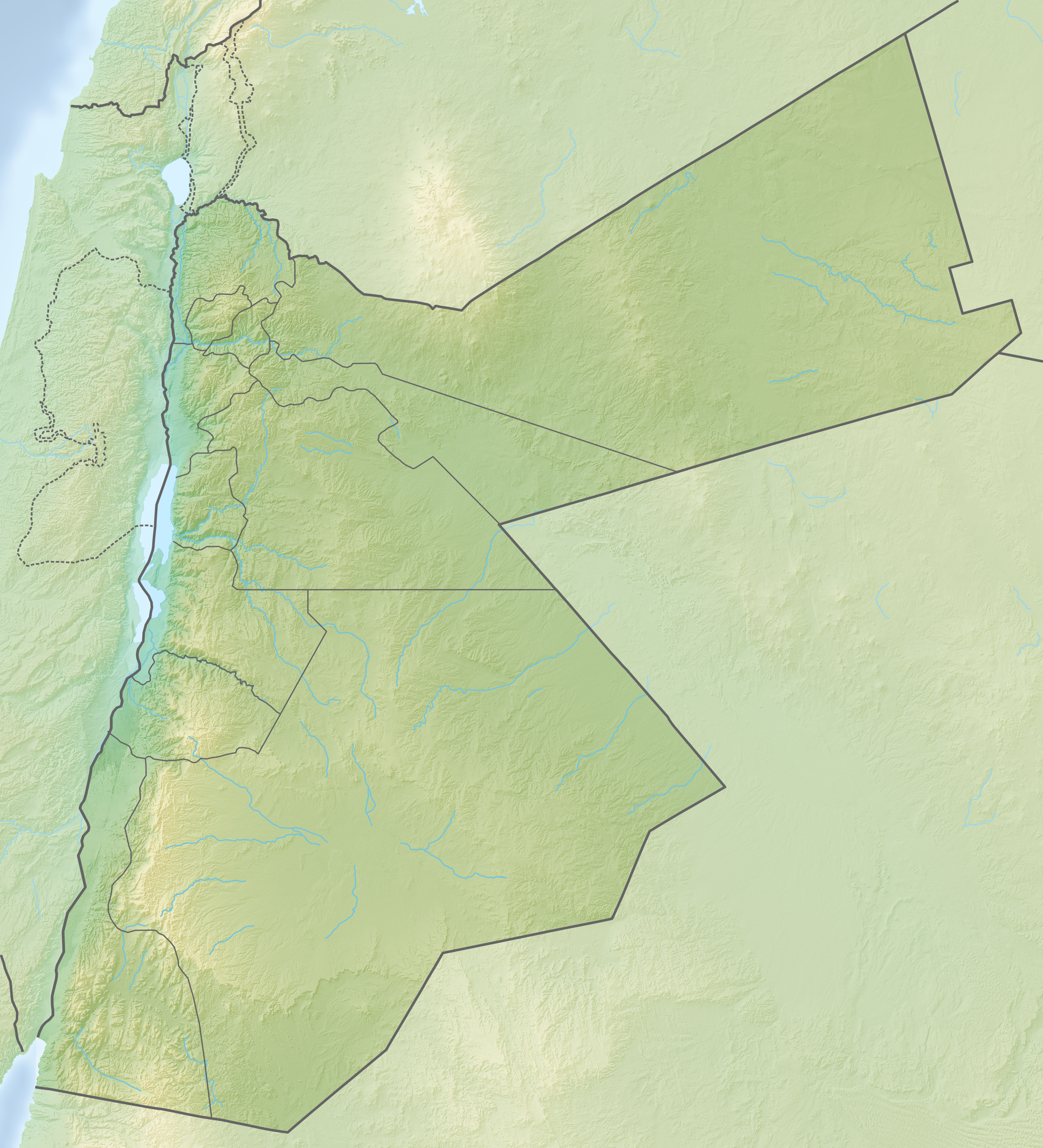
- Muwaqqar Chalk-Marl Formation (Jordan)

The Muwaqqar Chalk-Marl Formation or Muwaqqar Formation is a Late Cretaceous (Maastrichtian) and early Paleogene-aged geological formation in Jordan, cropping out across the Jordanian Highlands from north to south. It is the geological formation containing Jordan's famous oil shales, which are among the largest in the world. Some outcrops of the formation contain extremely well-preserved fossils, making it a lagerstätte.

== Environment ==
The formation appears to have been deposited in a pelagic subtropical environment on the outer continental shelf of the Afro-Arabian continent, with the Harrana locality being deposited no deeper than 100 metres (330 ft) below the surface, based on the occurrence of depth-limited fauna such as nurse sharks. The formation of this habitat likely originates from a major marine transgression of the Tethys Ocean at the same time as this depositional event, turning it into an open water ecosystem. The oil shales may have formed from cold upwelling currents from the Tethys that increased the region's planktonic productivity, with these fossilized plankton eventually turning into oil. The sites of excellent fossil preservation may have been formed by anoxic conditions on the seafloor hindering the decomposition of organic matter as well as rapid burial of fossils, although the presence of bottom-dwelling scavengers suggests that anoxic conditions must have been relatively moderate.

While the formation as a whole lasts from the early Maastrichtian to the end of the Paleocene based on foraminifera-based dating, a significant uncomformity exists in some localities at the Cretaceous-Paleogene boundary, which may be due to a drop in sea levels at the time, with deposition continuing following a second sea level rise in the Paleocene. In addition, the highly fossiliferous portion of the formation was only deposited in the span of a few hundred thousand years at the end of the Maastrichtian.

== Paleobiota ==
A locality in Harrana is a Konservat-Lagerstätte with extremely well-preserved fossils that were deposited during the latest Maastrichtian, around 66.5 to 66.1 million years ago, making it one of the last lagerstatten to be deposited before the Cretaceous-Paleogene extinction event. The preservation is akin to that of the older, more well-known Sannine Formation from Lebanon. Fossils are contained in concretions exposed by limestone mining, which started in the Harrana region around 1995. Notable fossils from this locality include articulated fish and mosasaur skeletons, mosasaur skin impressions, and evidence of mosasaur carcasses scavenged by nurse sharks & other fishes.

The fossil potential of the Harrana locality was documented by geologist Hani Kaddumi, who described most of the formation's taxa in a 2009 book. Many fossils from this locality are held in the Eternal River Museum of Natural History in Jordan.

The following list of biota is based primarily on Kaddumi (2009). Unless stated otherwise, a majority are from the Harrana locality:

=== Cartilaginous fish ===
Genus	Species	Material	Notes	Images
Batoidea indet.		Articulated pectoral wing	A gigantic ray of uncertain affinities.	
Cretalamna	C. biauriculata	Teeth	An otodontid shark.	
Ginglymostoma	G. sp.	Teeth	A nurse shark, teeth found embedded in a fossil mosasaur carcass.	
Harranahynchus	H. minutadens	3 articulated specimens, one nearly complete	A sawskate.	
Lamniformes indet.		Nearly complete specimen	A nearly complete mackerel shark.	
Myliobatidae indet.		Complete specimen	A complete, fully-preserved eagle ray.	
Schizorhiza	S. stromeri	Nearly complete rostrum	A sawskate.	
Squalicorax	S. pristodontus	Teeth	A crow shark.	

=== Bony fish ===
Genus	Species	Material	Notes	Images
'Beryciformes' indet.		Complete skeletons	A "beryciform" under the sensu lato interpretation, but potentially a veliferid.	
Cimolichthys sp.		Articulated skeleton	A cimolichthyid aulopiform.	
Dercetidae indet.		Complete skeleton	A dercetid aulopiform, similar to Dercetis triqueter and possibly a new species of Dercetis.	
Elopidae indet.		Complete skeleton	A relative of ladyfish.	
Enchodus	E. harranaensis	Articulated partial specimens, isolated teeth	An enchodontid aulopiform.	E. petrosus, a related species
Eurypholis	E. sp.	Articulated skeletons	An enchodontid aulopiform.	E. boissieri, a related species
Ichthyodectes	I. sp.	Articulated skull, rest of the skeleton most likely lost	An ichthyodectid ichthyodectiform.	
Ichthyodectidae indet.		Poorly-preserved articulated skull & vertebral column	An indeterminate ichthyodectid with very large teeth.	
Percomorpha indet.		Complete skeleton	A moonyfish-like percomorph (initially identified as a perciform).	
Postredectes	P. harranaensis	Articulated skull with associated remains	An ichthyodectid ichthyodectiform.	
Stratodus	S. apicalis	Four fully articulated skulls	A dercetid aulopiform.	
Saurocephalus	S. longicorpus	Six articulated specimens, the most complete known for the genus.	A saurodontid ichthyodectiform.	S. lanciformis, a related species
Teleostei indet.		Complete skeleton	A bizarre fish with a deeply forked tail and a stooped forehead akin to that of a dolphinfish. Taxonomic identity uncertain.	

=== Reptiles ===
Genus	Species	Material	Notes	Images
Rarosaurus	R. singularis	Rostrum with teeth	An indeterminate marine reptile, initially described as a late-surviving polycotylid plesiosaur, but more recently found to possibly be a marine crocodylomorph.	

==== Mosasaurs ====
Genus	Species	Material	Notes	Images
Carinodens	C. palistinicus	A complete skull, some vertebrae, and digits from front flippers.	A globidensine, the most completely known member of its genus. Likely adapted to a pelagic lifestyle.	C. belgicus, a related species
Harranasaurus	H. khuludae	Right dentary	A small durophagous globidensine. Remains very rare.	
Mosasauridae indet.		Articulated hind paddle	A mosasaur of uncertain affinities.	
Mosasaurus	M. hoffmani	Teeth	A mosasaurine.	
Mosasaurus	M. sevciki	Hindlimbs, sacral vertebrae, preserved scales	A mosasaurine.	
Mosasaurus	M. sp. 1	Front paddle, humerus	A mosasaurine.	
Mosasaurus	M. sp. 2	Vertebra	A mosasaurine.	
Plioplatecarpini indet.		Hind paddle	A plioplatecarpine.	
Prognathodon	P. hashimi (=Tenerasaurus)	Complete post-cranial skeleton missing skull.	A prognathodontine. P. primus has the first known complete mosasaur skull from the Middle East.	
Prognathodon	P. hudae	Left dentary.	A prognathodontine. P. primus has the first known complete mosasaur skull from the Middle East.	
Prognathodon	P. primus	Complete skull.	A prognathodontine. P. primus has the first known complete mosasaur skull from the Middle East.	
Prognathodon	P. sp. 1	Cranium with teeth	A prognathodontine. P. primus has the first known complete mosasaur skull from the Middle East.	
Prognathodon	P. sp. 2	Partial dentary with teeth	A prognathodontine. P. primus has the first known complete mosasaur skull from the Middle East.	
Prognathodon	P. sp. 3	Cranial elements including left maxilla with teeth.	A prognathodontine. P. primus has the first known complete mosasaur skull from the Middle East.	
Prognathodon	P. sp. 4	Lumbar vertebrae and pygal	A prognathodontine. P. primus has the first known complete mosasaur skull from the Middle East.	
Prognathodon	P. sp. 5	Two teeth	A prognathodontine. P. primus has the first known complete mosasaur skull from the Middle East.	
Tylosaurinae indet.		Front paddle.	A tylosaurine.	

==== Turtles ====
Genus	Species	Material	Notes	Images
Cheloniidae indet.		Articulated pectoral girdle.	A very large cheloniid sea turtle.	
Chelonioidea indet. 1		A right humerus	A very large sea turtle.	
Chelonioidea indet. 2.		Front paddle	A very large sea turtle.	
Gigantatypus	G. salahi	A right humerus.	A very large cheloniid sea turtle.	

==== Pterosaurs ====
Genus	Species	Material	Locality	Notes	Images
Inabtanin	I. alarabia	Jaws, vertebrae, and front limb bones.	Tal Inab 6	An azhdarchoid pterosaur, one of the most complete from the region.	
Nyctosauridae indet.		Wing bones.	Harrana	A nyctosaurid pterosaur.	

=== Mollusca ===
Based on Krewesh et al (2014) and Jagt et al (2017):

==== Cephalopoda ====
Genus	Species	Material	Notes	Images
Baculites	B. ovatus	Jebal Khuzaym, Harrana	A baculitid ammonite.	
Libycoceras	L. acutidorsatus	Harrana	A sphenodiscid ammonite.	
Libycoceras	L. cf. ismaeli	Jebal Khuzaym	A sphenodiscid ammonite.	
Menuites	M. fresvillensis	Harrana	A pachydiscid ammonite.	
Pachydiscus	P. dossantosi	Harrana	A pachydiscid ammonite.	
Sphenodiscus	S. lobatus	Jebal Khuzaym	A sphenodiscid ammonite.	

==== Bivalvia ====
Genus	Species	Material	Notes	Images
Lyropecten	L. mayereymari		A scallop.	
Tenuipteria	T. argentea		An inoceramid.	
