= Wadi Harrana =

Geographic region of eastern Jordan

Wadi Harrana is a seasonal stream (wadi) in the eastern Jordanian Badia, about sixty kilometers southeast of the city of Amman. It runs eastwards from the edge of the Jordanian Highlands to the Azraq oasis.

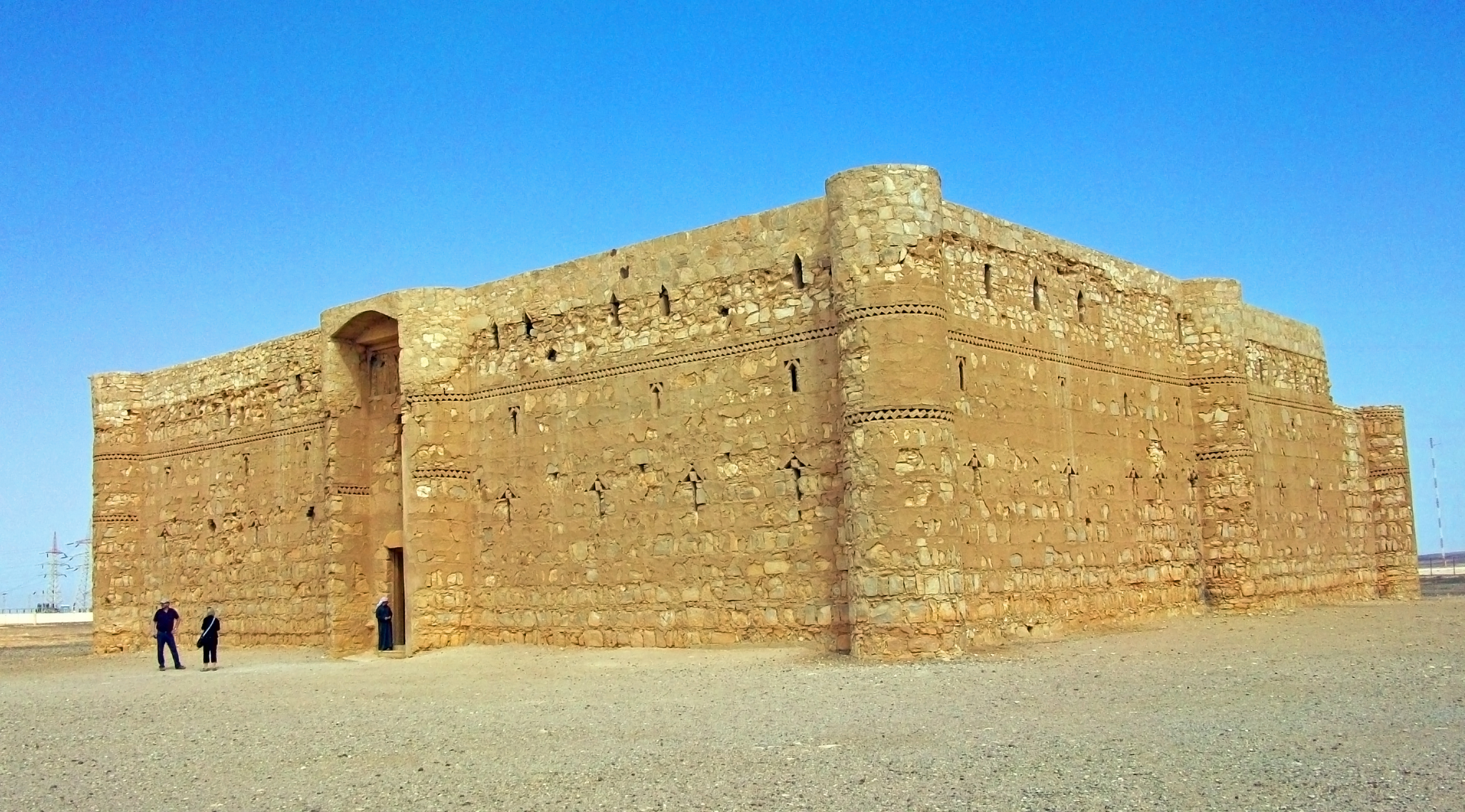
Qasr Kharana

== Flora and fauna ==
Harrana's climate, much like most of Jordan, is influenced by the moderate Mediterranean climate from the west, the very hot Sahara's climate from the east, and the cold European climate from the north.

Though arid, the area is rich in animal life. Birds, owls, rodents, rabbits, foxes, occasional wolves and hyenas, snakes, and lizards are some of the animals that take refuge in Harrana. A variety of flowering plants bloom during late winter and early spring months, including mustard plants, oriental poppies, and wild irises. Cistanche tubulosa, or the desert broomrape, is another resident in Harrana blooming towards the end of spring and beginning of summer.

== Palaeontology ==
Harrana is significant for its fossil deposits preserved in gigantic limestone concretions that date back to the latest Maastrichtian some 66–67 million years ago, a period notably close to the end-Cretaceous extinction events when many groups of animals such as dinosaurs and as much as 65–70% of all marine animal species became extinct. Mosasaur specimens along with their remarkably well preserved scale imprints have been discovered from late Maastrichtian deposits of the Muwaqqar Chalk Marl Formation of Harrana The best preserved and complete specimens of the extinct teleostean fish genus Saurocephalus and the most complete mosasaur Carinodens remains come from the latest Maastrichtian of Harrana.

== See also ==
- Qasr Kharana
- Kharaneh IV
