= List of Cretaceous lagerstätten =

The list of Cretaceous Lagerstätten is a documentation of Lagerstätte fossils sites around the world, dated to the Cretaceous period. These are characterized by exceptional preservation of fossil organisms, regularly including many well-preserved animals and their soft tissue remains. The extent of Lagerstätten deposits can range from a select site or stratigraphic layer to a whole formation or group. Some sites that one author calls a single Lagerstätte may be called multiple by another (such as the Jehol Biota and the Yixian/Jiufotang Formations). This list attempts to note this in the text and provide the formation or stratigraphic unit from which a site came.

== Criteria ==
Sites on the list must either:

1. Be referred to as a Lagerstätte within the main text of at least one scientific publication. Similar terms, such as 'exceptional preservation', do not qualify.
2. Have fossils that fulfill the criteria of Konservat-Lagerstätte as set within Kimmig & Schiffbauer (2024): Konservat-Lagerstätten are characterized by exceptional preservation, and at least 5% of the fossils recovered from a site must preserve either soft tissue remains or nearly complete individuals, preferably both.

Color key
| Konservat | Konzentrat | "Liberation" |

== Lagerstätten ==
| Site(s) | Age | Location | Significance | Notable fossils/organisms |
|---|---|---|---|---|
| Muzinho Shale | latest Jurassic/earliest Cretaceous | Parnaíba Basin, Brazil | A black shale deposit containing articulated, three-dimensionally preserved fish skeletons. | |
| Angeac-Charente bonebed | ~141 Ma | Charente, France | A Lagerstätte preserving both vertebrate and invertebrate fossils from the poorly represented Berriasian stage, known for its taphonomic and sedimentological 'frozen scenes'. | 'A sauropod limb from Angeac |
| El Montsec (La Pedrera de Rúbies Formation) | ~140-125 Ma | Catalonia, Spain | Known from exceptional preservation of biota such as plants, fish, insects, crustaceans, and even some tetrapods. | Montsecosuchus, atoposaurid crocodylomorph |
| Apple Bay Locality | ~136 Ma | Vancouver Island, British Colombia, Canada | A site that preserves an exceptional collection of plant and fungal specimens during the peak of pre-angiosperm plant diversity. Many specimens are preserved in three dimensions, with cell-level detail being observed within marine siderite concretions. | |
| Lebanese amber | ~130-125 Ma (Barremian) | Lebanon | Preserves a high diversity of insects from the Early Cretaceous, and is among the oldest known fossilized amber to contain a significant number of preserved organisms. Includes many of the oldest known members of modern insect groups, and many of the youngest known members for extinct insect groups. | Preserved larval lacewings (Tragichrysa ovoruptora) |
| Grès du Liban Dysodiles | lower Barremian | Lebanon | A terrestrial Lagerstätte that would have formed in a lake environment with nearby volcanic activity. Plant macrofossils, as well as pollen, fish, gastropods, turtles, insects, and coprilites have been found in exceptional detail. | |
| Cheiron Ravine | Lower Hauterivian | Alpes-de-Haute-Provence, Provence-Alpes-Côte d'Azur, France | A Konzentrat site that produces massive assemblages of ammonites. | |
| Dabeigou Formation | 132-130 Ma (Hauterivian) | Hebei, China | A part of the Jehol Biota Lagerstätten. Contains birds, amphibians, and insects. | The holotype of Jinguofortis, an avialan from the formation. |
| Tayasir Formation | 148-122 Ma (Hauterivian) | West Bank, Palestine, occupied by Israel | A lacustrine environment that preserves pipoid frogs in full ontogeny as well as fossil insects. | |
| Pilmatué Member Crinoid Bed | Valanginian | Neuquén & Mendoza, Argentina | A localized Lagerstätte for the crinoid genus Isocrinus. It was deposited in a mid-latitude back-arc basin. | |
| Tyndall Fossil Lagerstätte | Valanginian-Hauterivian | Torres del Paine National Park, Chile | A site that is host to an ichthyosaur graveyard that is both a konzentrat and konservat site. Belemnites, ammonites, and actinopterygian fishes are also known. | |
| Huajiying Formation | Valanginian-Hauterivian | Hebei, China | A part of the Jehol Biota Lagerstätten. Contains dinosaurs, pterosaurs, fish, and invertebrates. Like the rest of the biota, these animals would have lived in a lake near a volcano. | Holotype of Archaeornithura, a bird. |
| Las Hoyas | ~125 Ma (Barremian) | Cuenca, Spain | The site is mostly known for its exquisitely preserved dinosaurs, especially enantiornitheans. The lithology of the formation mostly consists of lacustrine limestone deposited in a freshwater wetland environment. | Concornis, an early enantiornithean |
| Cornappo Torrent | Barremian | Friuli-Venezia Giulia, Italy | Pycnodonts have been recovered from this locality. | |
| Turga Lagerstätte | Barremian-Aptian | Transbaikalia, Russia | Fish, bivalves, mayflies, and pollen are known from the site. | |
| Yixian Formation | ~125–121 Ma (Barremian-Aptian) | Liaoning, China | The Yixian Formation is well known for its great diversity of well-preserved specimens and its feathered dinosaurs, such as the large tyrannosauroid Yutyrannus, the therizinosaur Beipiaosaurus, and various small birds, along with a selection of other dinosaurs, such as the iguanodontian Bolong, the sauropod Dongbeititan and the ceratopsian Psittacosaurus. | Sinosauropteryx, the first recognized non-avian dinosaur with evidence of feathers |
| Jiufotang Formation | ~122-119 Ma (Aptian) | Liaoning, China | This formation overlies the slightly older Yixian Formation and preserved very similar species, including a wide variety of dinosaurs such as the ceratopsian Psittacosaurus and the early bird Confuciusornis, both of which are also found in the Yixian Formation. Also notable are the abundant dromaeosaurid Microraptor specimens, known from up to 300 individuals and among the most common animals found here. | Fossil of Microraptor, a feathered non-avian dinosaur |
| Moqi Fossil Bed | ~120-118 Ma (Aptian) | Morin Dawa, Inner Mongolia, China | A freshwater site preserving amphibians, including frogs and salamanders, insects, conchostracans, turtles, and fish. | |
| Khasurty locality | ? (Aptian) | Buryatia, Russia | One of the largest fossil insect sites in northern Asia, with over 6000 fossilized insect specimens preserved in mudstones, representing over 16 orders and 130 families. Taxa have both Jurassic and Cretaceous affinities. Fossils of other invertebrates, such as arachnids & crustaceans, are also known, as are small plants and fragmentary vertebrate remains, such as fish scales and bird feathers. | |
| Baissa Lagerstätte | Aptian | Transbaikalia, Russia | A locality within the Zaza Formation deposited in a lake environment. plants, insects, ostracodes, tetrapods, and fish have been recovered from the deposit. | |
| Shengjinkou Formation | ~120 Ma | Xinjiang, China | Part of the finds from this site consisted of dense concentrations of pterosaur bones, associated with soft tissues and eggs. The site represented a nesting colony that storm floods had covered with mud. Dozens of individuals could be secured from a total that in 2014 was estimated to run into the many hundreds. | Hamititan, a large titanosaurian sauropod |
| Xiagou Formation | ~120–115? Ma | Gansu, China | This site preserves fossils of Gansus yumenensis, one of the earliest known true modern birds. | Gansus is among the earliest known modern birds |
| Paja Formation | 130-113 Ma | Colombia | This site is famous for its vertebrate fossils and is the richest Mesozoic fossiliferous formation of Colombia. Several marine reptile fossils of plesiosaurs, pliosaurs, ichthyosaurs, and turtles have been described from the formation, and it hosts the only dinosaur fossils described in the country to date; the titanosauriform sauropod Padillasaurus. | Desmatochelys, a protostegid turtle |
| Koonwarra Fossil Bed | around 118-115 Ma | Victoria, Australia | This site is composed of mudstone sediment thought to have been laid down in a freshwater lake. Arthropods, fish, and plant fossils are known from this site. | Tarwinia, a large sized stem-flea |
| El Espinal Lagerstätte | Late Aptian | Chiapas, Mexico | A lagoonal site documenting a diverse assemblage of fish, invertebrates, and plants. Belongs to the larger Sierra Madre Formation/Group. | |
| Nakagawa Amber | 116-114 Ma (Upper Aptian) | Northern Hokkaido,Japan | An amber Lagerstätte that preserves a diverse array of arthropods and floral and fungal tissue. | |
| Crato Formation | 113 Ma | northeast Brazil | The Crato Formation has yielded an exceedingly well-preserved and diverse fossil faunal assemblage. Some 25 species of fossil fishes are often found with stomach contents preserved, enabling paleontologists to study predator-prey relationships in this ecosystem. There are also examples of pterosaurs, reptiles and amphibians, invertebrates (particularly insects), and plants. Also known from this site is "Ubirajara", the first non-avian dinosaur from the southern hemisphere found with evidence of feathers. Additionally, the formation abounds with evidence of plant-insect interactions. | Tupandactylus navigans, a pterosaur with preserved soft tissues |
| Amargosa Bed (Marizal Formation) | ? (Aptian-Albian) | northeast Brazil | A fluvial site that preserved fish, crustacean, and plant fossils. | |
| Ariño Amber | Lower Albian | Teruel Province, Spain | A site from the middle member of the Escucha Formation deposited within a freshwater swamp environment. This site has numerous inclusions in amber, including a well-preserved mite. | |
| Álava amber | Upper Aptian–middle Albian | Sierra de Cantabria, Spain | Several sites that preserve a diverse arthropod fauna and represent one of the most significant amber deposits in the world for the Mesozoic. | |
| El Soplao amber | Albian | Cantabria, Spain | A Konservat-Lagerstätte within the Las Peñosas Formation preserving a diverse arthropod fauna within amber | Restoration of the aquatic invertebrates associated with the resiniferous forest (background) that produced the site's amber fossils |
| Loma del Pterodaustro | Albian | San Luis, Argentina | A site mainly known for preserving the filter-feeding pterosaur Pterodaustro. Plant remains, as well as fish and clam shrimp, have also been recovered from the site. This deposit was most likely a shallow lake within a semi-arid climate. is found within the Lagarcito Formation. | A restoration of Pterodaustro, a filter-feeding pterosaur, and the namesake for the site |
| Utrillas Group Oasis | Albian | Teruel, Spain | A site that preserves fossilized liverworts within a cyclic, oasis ecosystem within a desert. | |
| Pietraroja Plattenkalk | 113-110 Ma | Campania, Italy | A Konservat-Lagerstätte famous for its diverse and well-preserved fish and plant fossils. Also known from this formation is Scipionyx, one of Europe's most well-preserved dinosaurs. | Scipionyx, a small dinosaur with preserved internal organs |
| Jinju Formation | 112.4–106.5 Ma | South Korea | The Jinju Formation is notable for the post-Jehol Group insect assemblage, as well as other fauna such as isopods and fish. The site is also notable for its abundance and diversity of tetrapod trackways. | Coptoclavidae beetle larva preserved at this locality |
| Tlayúa Formation | 110 Ma | Puebla, Mexico | A marine lagerstätte preserving Albian actinopterygians, lepidosaurs, and a diverse assemblage of arthropods. | Cipactlichthys, an example of a fish from this site |
| Archingeay-Les Nouillers Lagerstätte | 113-93 Ma | Charente-Maritime, France | A site that preserves various plant remains, arthropods (mainly insects) and gastropods trapped in amber. | A 3D rendering of a flint containing the remains of four different plant species: Brachyphyllum, Frenelopsis, Geinitzia and Glenrosa. |
| Romualdo Formation | 108–92 Ma | northeast Brazil | The Romualdo Formation is a part of the Santana Group. It has provided a rich assemblage of fossils: flora, fish, arthropods, insects, turtles, snakes, dinosaurs such as Irritator, and pterosaurs such as Thalassodromeus. The stratigraphic units of the group contain several bird feathers, among them the first record of Mesozoic birds in Brazil. | Tapejara, a common pterosaur in Brazil during the Early Cretaceous |
| Les Faïsses Section | Upper Albian | Alpes de Haute-Provence, France | A Konzentrat site within the Marnes Bleues Formation deposited within a pelagic environment that preserves remains of plesiosaurs, ammonites, nannofossils, inoceramids, and shark teeth. | |
| Muhi Quarry (El Doctor Formation) | ? (Albian to Cenomanian, probably Late Albian) | Hidalgo, Mexico | While this site produced limestones for construction, rocks in that locality contain a diverse Cretaceous marine biota such as fish, ammonites, and crustaceans. | Motlayoichthys, a member of Pachyrhizodontidae |
| Puy-Puy Lagerstätte | 100.5 Ma | France | A paralic site preserving a variety of ichnofossils, along with some vertebrate remains. The site preserves evidence of plant-insect interaction. | |
| Burmese amber | 101-99 Ma (latest Albian/earliest Cenomanian) | Myanmar | More than 1,000 species have been described from amber of Hukawng Valley. While it is important for understanding the evolution of organisms, particularly insects, during the Cretaceous period, it is also highly controversial due to ethical issues stemming from parachute science and the site's association with conflicts and poor labor conditions. | Oculudentavis, small lizard |
| Les Renardières | Uppermost Albian-Lower Cenomanian | Charente-Maritime, France | This site preserves plant fossils, amber deposits, and vertebrate microremains such as fishes, crocodilians, turtles, snakes, dinosaur teeth, and mammals. | |
| El Chango Lagerstätte | Earliest Cenomanian | Chiapas, Mexico | A site from the beginning of the Angiosperm Terrestrial Revolution containing early evidence of insect predation on angiosperms. Belongs to the larger Sierra Madre Formation/Group. | |
| Cambridge Greensand | Early Cenomanian | Hertfordshire and Cambridgeshire, England, UK | A Konzentrat-Lagerstätte from a nearshore deposit. pterosaurs, dinosaurs, and ichthyosaurs have been recovered from the site. | |
| Jaunay-Clan Lagerstätte | Early Cenomanian | Vienne, Nouvelle-Aquitaine, France | A site that preserves plant fossils, beetles, and feathers | |
| Jbel Oum Tkout Lagerstätte (OT1) | Early Cenomanian | South-eastern Morocco | A site within the Kem Kem Group that preserves fish fossils, including hard-to-preserve soft organs like the intestines. Other fossils found within the site include plants, bivalves, and crustaceans. The site was most likely formed within a seasonal lake deposit. | |
| Magliano Vetere Lagertätte | Middle Cenomanian | Campania, Italy | A site mostly known for its terrestrial plant macrofossils. Fish, coprolites, and shallow water microfossils have also been recovered | |
| Boyacá Lagerstätte (Churuvita and San Rafael Formations) | 95-90 Ma | Boyacá, Colombia | A site that preserves articulated crustacean fossils. | |
| Floresta locality | Upper Cenomanian | Sicily, Italy | A marine site that produces fossil cephalopod gladii with preserved soft tissue. | |
| English Chalk | 100-90 Ma (Cenomanian to Turonian) | UK | Two subsections of England's famous chalk formation, the Grey Chalk Subgroup and the lower sections of the White Chalk Subgroup, yield three-dimensionally preserved fossils of marine fishes. This exquisite level of preservation is unlike that of fish fossils from other deposits of the same age, which are preserved only as two-dimensional compression fossils. | Fossil of the fish Aulolepis typus |
| Sannine Formation (Haqel, Hjoula, and al-Nammoura lagerstätten) | 95-94 Ma | Lebanon | Lebanese Konservat-Lagerstätten of the Late Cretaceous (middle to late Cenomanian) age, which contains a well-preserved variety of different fossils. Small animals such as shrimp, octopuses, stingrays, and bony fish are common finds at these sites. Some of the rarest fossils from this locality include those of octopuses. | Ichthyoceros, a pycnodont actinopterygian |
| Ein Yabrud (Amminadav Formation or Bet-Meir Formation) | Cenomanian | West Bank,Palestine occupied by Israel | The marine fossil site with well-preserved marine vertebrate fossils, especially fossils of early legged snakes like Haasiophis and Pachyrhachis has quality of preservation rivals that of other famous Lagerstätte. | Scalacurvichthys, a pycnodont actinopterygian |
| Komen Limestone | 95-94 Ma | Komen, Slovenia | A Late Cenomanian locality in the Karst of Slovenia with a high diversity of articulated fossil fish, in addition to small reptiles and invertebrates. | The marine lizard Carsosaurus |
| Hesseltal Formation | 94–93 Ma | Saxony & North Rhine-Westphalia, Germany | Deposited during the anoxic conditions of the Cenomanian-Turonian boundary event, this formation has a high number of well-preserved, articulated fish skeletons, in addition to exceptionally preserved ammonites with soft parts. | The billfish-like Rhamphoichthys |
| Tamagawa Formation | 93-85.2 Ma | Iwate, Japan | A site that produces plant fossils, as well as vertebrates, such as crocodilians and choristoderes. | Adocus kohaku, an adocid turtle |
| Vallecillo (Agua Nueva Formation) | 94–92 Ma | Nuevo León, Mexico | The site is noted for its qualities as a konservat-lagerstätte, with notable finds including the plesiosaur Mauriciosaurus and the possible shark Aquilolamna. | Mauriciosaurus, a short-necked plesiosaur |
| Conulus Bed | Turonian | Poland | A crinoid konzentrat-lagerstätte. | |
| Akrabou Formation (Gara Sbaa/Agoult & Goulmima) | ? (Turonian) | Asfla, Morocco | Marine site known for exceptionally preserved, three-dimensional fish fossils. | Grandemarinus, an early gar |
| Orapa diamond mine | Turonian | Botswana | An insect lagerstätte known for being one of the few entomofaunas from southern Africa, containing a variety of insects, particularly beetles. | |
| New Jersey amber | 91-89 Ma | New Jersey, US | Turonian-aged amber from the Raritan & Magothy Formations of New Jersey, with a high diversity of well-preserved insects, plants, and fungi. | Sphecomyrma, an early ant |
| Múzquiz Lagerstätte | Late Turonian to Early Coniacian | Coahuila, Mexico | A site known for the pterosaur Muzquizopteryx and fish remains. | Muzquizopteryx, a pterosaur from the site preserving soft tissue |
| Lower Idzików beds | 87-86 Ma (Coniacian) | Lower Silesian Voivodeship, Poland | An exposure of these beds near Stary Waliszów contains a Konzentrat-Lagerstätte of numerous Cretaceous marine invertebrates in concretions, including decapods, molluscs, and echinoderms, as well as well-preserved plant fossils that indicate a nearshore environment. Very well-preserved phosphatized decapod remains are known. | |
| Smoky Hill Chalk | 87–82 Ma | Kansas and Nebraska, US | A Cretaceous Konservat-Lagerstätte known primarily for its exceptionally well-preserved marine reptiles. Also known from this site are fossils of large bony fish such as Xiphactinus, mosasaurs, flying reptiles or pterosaurs (namely Pteranodon), flightless marine birds such as Hesperornis, and turtles. | Xiphactinus is famous for being found with another fish (Gillicus) preserved in its stomach. |
| Yantardakh Lagerstätte | Santonian | Taimyr Peninsula, Krasnoyarsk Krai, Russia | The site that produces Taimyr Amber. Many invertebrates, including beetles, ants, flies, wasps, and Hemipterans, have been found at the site. | A photograph of the holotype of Baikuris mandibularis, an ant found within Taimyr Amber |
| Ingersoll Shale | 85 Ma | Alabama, US | A Late Cretaceous (Santonian) informal geological unit in eastern Alabama. Fourteen theropod feathers assigned to birds and possibly dromaeosaurids have been recovered from the unit. | |
| Tuscaloosa Formation | Late Cenomanian | Alabama, US | An ichnofossil Konzentrat-Lagerstätte. | |
| Polazzo lagerstätte | ~85 Ma | Italy | A carbonate platform that preserves fish, alongside rudists. The genus Polazzodus is named after the site. | |
| Sahel Alma | ~84 Ma | Lebanon | A Late Cretaceous (Santonian) Konservat-Lagerstätte with similar excellent preservation of marine organisms as the nearby, older Sannine Lagerstätte, but in a deep-water environment. Includes a high number of well-preserved shark body fossils, in addition to cephalopods and deepwater arthropods. | Propristiophorus, an early sawshark |
| Calcare di Aurisina | ~80-70.6 Ma | Italy & Slovenia | A late Cretaceous shallow marine series of carbonate platforms dominated by rudists, with fossils of invertebrates and vertebrates, especially fishes. Its best known outcrop is the Villaggio del Pescatore site, that yielded the holotype of Tethyshadros, as well other exceptionally preserved taxa like Acynodon adriaticus. | "Antonio" specimen of Tethyshadros |
| Tartaruguito Outcrop | Campanian-Maastrichtian | São Paulo, Brazil | A site known mainly for its high number and quality preservation of turtles. Crocodilians have also been recovered. | |
| Auca Mahuevo | 80 Ma | Patagonia, Argentina | A Cretaceous Lagerstätte in the eroded badlands of the Patagonian province of Neuquén, Argentina. The sedimentary layers of the Anacleto Formation at Auca Mahuevo were deposited between 83.5 and 79.5 million years ago and offer a view of a fossilized titanosaurid nesting site. | An egg from a titanosaurian sauropod |
| Tzimol | Campanian | Ochuxhob, Chiapas, Mexico | A quarry within the Angostura Formation that was deposited within shallow marine limestone deposits. Rudists, corals, forams, algae, echinoderms, fish, and plants have been recovered from the site. | |
| Stompoor Farm | Middle Campanian | Northern Cape, South Africa | A maar site known for its preservation of anurans. Other fossils found at the site include fish, birds, bivalves, gastropods, insects, and plants. | |
| Ellisdale Fossil Site | 79-76 Ma | New Jersey, US | A middle Campanian Konzentrat-Lagerstätte from the Marshalltown Formation with one of the most diverse Mesozoic vertebrate faunas of eastern North America, likely originating from a flood event. Many disarticulated bones of dinosaurs, fish, reptiles, amphibians, and small mammals is known, most of which are microfossils. | |
| Coon Creek Formation | 76.8-76.0 Ma | Tennessee and Mississippi, US | This late Campanian formation has some of the world's best-preserved remains of Cretaceous marine invertebrates (primarily mollusks and decapod crustaceans), with many retaining their original aragonitic shells and exoskeletons. | The fossil crab Avitelmessus grapsoides, which occurs in great numbers at Coon Creek |
| Baumberge Formation | ~75-72 Ma | North Rhine-Westphalia, Germany | A late Campanian formation in the Baumberge of Germany with a high number of articulated fossil fish remains, in addition to shark body fossils. | The paracanthopterygian fish Sphenocephalus |
| Coffee Sands | Campanian | Tennessee, Mississippi, US | A proposed "Liberation Lagerstätte".^{see notes} most likely represented a beach during the Cretaceous. preserves dinosaur remains, along with ammonites, gastropods, and brachiopods. | |
| Sanagasta paleohydrothermal field | Campanian | La Rioja, Argentina | A fossil site that preserves a community of extremophile microorganisms living within a geothermal field including cyanobacteria, bifidobacteria,, vibrios-like organisms and "protists". Fragments of arthropods have been found within the same deposit. A part of the greater Los Llanos Formation. | |
| Nardò (Calcari di Melissano) | ~72-70 Ma (upper Campanian-lower Maastrichtian) | Apulia, Italy | This site is especially famous for its limestone, containing abundant fossil fish remains. | Nardovelifer, an early lampriform |
| Ripley Formation | Campanian–Maastrichtian | Georgia, Alabama, Mississippi, Tennessee, US | A proposed "Liberation Lagerstätte".^{see notes} Ichnofossils and shelly animals like brachiopods, bivalves, ammonites, and foraminiferans, have been found at the formation. | |
| Rügen Chalk | Early Maastrichtian | Rügen, Mecklenburg-Vorpommern, Germany | A proposed "Liberation Lagerstätte".^{see notes} Belemnites, echinoids, hemichordates, bryozoans, and bivalves have been found at the site. | |
| Owl Creek Formation | Late Maastrichtian | Mississippi, US | A proposed "Liberation Lagerstätte".^{see notes} Ammonites, gastropods, bivalves, and shark remains have been found here. | |
| Amaral Site | Maastrichtian | Tornillo Flat, Texas, US | A monotypic Konzentrat Lagerstätte of pterosaur remains, belonging to Quetzalcoatlus lawsoni is present. The site was most likely deposited in alkaline lake water. | A skull restoration of Q. lawsoni, the pterosaur found at the site. |
| ENCI Nederland BV quarry (Maastricht Formation) | Late Maastrichtian | Netherlands | A crinoid Lagerstätte. | |
| Harrana (Muwaqqar Chalk Marl Formation) | 66.5-66.1 Ma (Late Maastrichtian) | Jordan | Phosphatic deposits formed in this site are known to preserve vertebrate fossils with soft tissue, such as mosasaurs, plesiosaurs, sharks, bony fish, turtles and crocodylians. | Postredectes, an example of fish fossil from this site |
| Rosario Formation | 66.12 Ma | Baja California, Mexico | A site that preserves large petrified logs with attached bark and broken branches, within tuffaceous sediment. | |
| Tanis | 66.0 Ma | North Dakota, US | Tanis is part of the extensively studied Hell Creek Formation, a group of rocks spanning four states in North America, renowned for numerous significant fossil discoveries from the Upper Cretaceous and the lower Palaeocene. Tanis is a significant site because it appears to record the events from the first hours after the impact of the giant Chicxulub impactor in extreme detail. This impact, which struck the Gulf of Mexico 66.043 million years ago, resulted in the extinction of all non-avian dinosaurs and many other species (the so-called "K-Pg" or "K-T" extinction). | Fossil sturgeon from the Tanis site |
| Mohgaonkalan lagerstätte | Late Maastrichtian-Early Danian | Madhya Pradesh, India | A site that preserves fossilized fruits within the volcanic Intertrappean Beds of the Deccan Traps. | |
| "Locality 84" | Late Cretaceous - Paleocene | Friuli-Venezia Giulia, Italy | Several groups of fish, as well as plant leaf fossils, and one bivalve have been recovered from the site. | |
