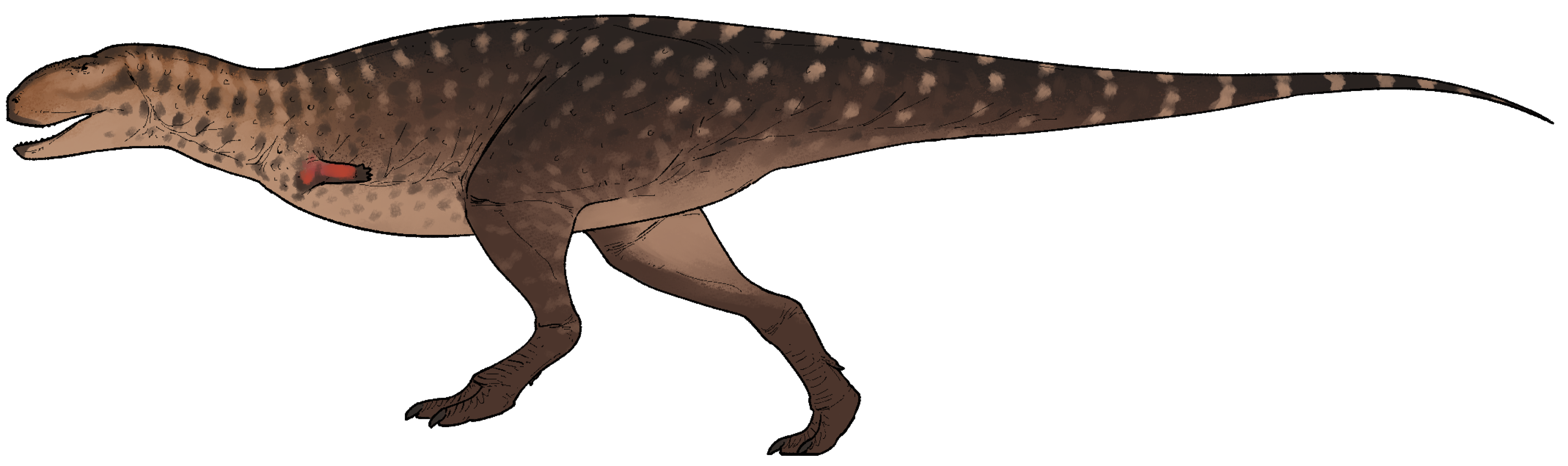
- Speculative life restoration

Scientific classification
- Kingdom: Animalia
- Phylum: Chordata
- Class: Reptilia
- Clade: Dinosauria
- Clade: Saurischia
- Clade: Theropoda
- Family: †Abelisauridae
- Genus: †Vitosaura; Jiménez Velandia et al., 2025
- Species: †V. colozacani

Binomial name
- †Vitosaura colozacani Jiménez Velandia et al., 2025

= Vitosaura =

Vitosaura Temporal range: Late Cretaceous, Campanian

Genus of abelisaurid dinosaurs

Vitosaura is an extinct genus of abelisaurid theropod dinosaurs known from the Late Cretaceous Los Llanos Formation of Argentina. The genus contains a single species, Vitosaura colozacani, known from a partial skeleton. Alongside Guemesia and the noasaurid Noasaurus, Vitosaura is one of the only Argentinian ceratosaurians found outside of Patagonia.

== Discovery and naming ==
During fieldwork in the Colozacán Valley conducted through 2009 and 2010, a partial theropod skeleton, found in association with various titanosaur sauropod remains, was collected from outcrops of the Los Llanos Formation. This site is located near Tama village in southeast La Rioja Province, Argentina. Following its excavation, the specimen was prepared at the La Rioja Regional Center for Scientific Research and Technology, where it is now permanently accessioned as CRILAR-Pv 506 in the vertebrate paleontology collections. The specimen consists of the centrum of the first dorsal (back) vertebra, a complete second dorsal vertebra, part of the sacrum, a partial left pelvis (ilium, pubis, and ischium), and other unidentified fragments.

In 2025, Harold Jiménez Velandia and colleagues described Vitosaura colozacani as a new genus and species of abelisaurid theropods, establishing CRILAR-Pv 506 as the holotype and only known specimen. The generic name, Vitosaura, honors 19th-century soldier Victoria 'Doña Vito' Romero, born in the Los Llanos region near the Vitosaura type locality. This is combined with 'saura', the feminine declension of the Ancient Greek σαῦρος (sauros), meaning 'lizard'. The specific name, colozacani, references the discovery of the specimen in the Colozacán Valley.

== Description ==
Measurements of the preserved material indicate Vitosaura was a medium-sized abelisaurid, with an estimated total length of between 4.5 and 5.5 meters (14.7 to 18 ft), comparable to the holotypes of Aucasaurus or Koleken. The level of co-ossification of the pelvic bones, as well as a histological analysis performed on the preserved pubis, indicate that the individual was almost or fully mature, with the count of lines of arrested growth providing an estimated age of 17 years.

== Classification ==
Phylogenetic analyses place Vitosaura as the sister taxon to the Cretaceous Indian abelisaurid Rahiolisaurus. However, further definition in the phylogenetic placement of Vitosaura difficult due to the incompleteness of the material, being recovered variously as a member of Majungasaurinae, Carnotaurini, as a non-brachyrostran furileusaurian, as the sister taxon of a clade formed by Rugops and more derived abelisaurids, or as a member of an early diverging clade with Eoabelisaurus and Xenotarsosaurus.

== Paleoecology ==
Vitosaura is recovered from the Campanian Los Llanos Formation. Its paleoenvironment has been characterized as semi-arid with a marked seasonality and yearly precipitation ranging from 23–45 cm (9.1–17.7 in), dominated by aeolian sedimentation. Other fossils known from this formation include the notosuchian Llanosuchus, indeterminate theropods, remains preliminary assigned to a second abelisaurid specimen, titanosaurs, and turtles.

The presence of Vitosaura in the Argentine northwest expands the known diversity of abelisaurids in the region, with Guemesia being the only previously known abelisaurid recovered, also implying that the abelisaurid assemblage in the region was composed of both early-diverging abelisaurids as well as deeply-nested abelisaurids, in a manner similar to that recovered for northern Patagonia. The recovery of Vitosaura as the sister taxon to the Indian Rahiolisaurus also has interesting biogeographic implications, indicating an affinity between South American and Indo-Malagasy species lasting until the Late Cretaceous, a result also found by Pol et al. with the Patagonian Abelisaurus being recovered as a potential —though weakly supported— member of Majungasaurinae. On the other hand, the recovery of Vitosaura as a brachyrostran would reinforce the similarity in the abelisaurid assemblage between the Argentine northwest and northern Patagonia, where Brachyrostra is the dominant clade of abelisaurids.
