= Los Llanos Formation =

Geological formation in Argentina

- Stratigraphic range: Campanian; ~84–70 Ma
- Type: Geological formation
- Underlies: exposed to surface
- Overlies: Unconformity with Early Permian Los Sauces & Patquía Formations or Ordovician granitic basement
- Thickness: Up to ~150 m (490 ft)

Lithology
- Primary: Sandstone, conglomerate
- Other: Paleosols

Location
- Coordinates: 30.6°S 66.6°W
- Approximate paleocoordinates: 33.8°S 39.5°W
- Region: La Rioja Province
- Country: Argentina
- Extent: Sanagasta geological park, Sierra de Los Llanos, Sierra de Chepes, Sierra Ulapes, Sierra de Velasco & Sierra Brava

Type section
- Named for: Sierra de Los Llanos
- Named by: Bodenbender
- Year defined: 1911
- Los Llanos Formation (Argentina)

Los Llanos Formation is a geological formation in the La Rioja Province, northwestern Argentina whose strata date back to the Campanian stage of the Late Cretaceous.

Los Llanos Formation over the years has been controversially described as ranging from Late Cretaceous to Miocene, but the Miocene succession was assigned to Las Mulitas Formation in 2019. The formation rests on top of the Early Permian Los Sauces and Patquía Formations and in parts on Ordovician crystalline basement. The maximum thickness is estimated at 150 metres (490 ft).

The sandstones and conglomerates of the formation were deposited ij a fluvial environment. The formation crops out in the Sanagasta geological park, where more than 90 titanosaurid nesting sites were discovered in Los Llanos Formation. The sites were encountered on top of areas characterized by hydrothermal activity as geysers and other vents, suggesting a preferred location for the incubation of the dinosaur eggs. Apart from fossil eggs, the formation has provided fossil flora and ostracods. The crocodyliform Llanosuchus, described in 2016 from the formation, was named after Los Llanos Formation.

== Description ==
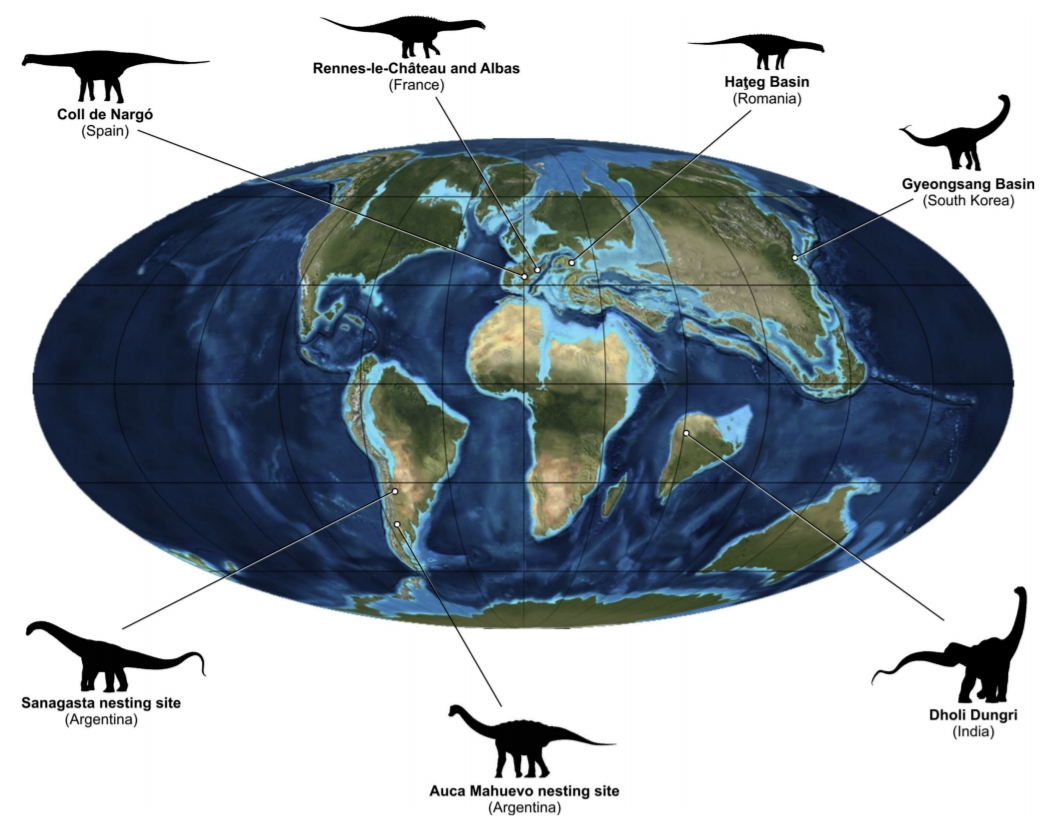
Paleogeography of the Late Cretaceous with distribution of titanosaur nesting sites

The Los Llanos Formation was first formally described by Bodenbender in 1911. The formation crops out in very localized patches in the south of La Rioja Province. Los Llanos Formation is found on the western and eastern slopes of the eponymous Sierra de Los Llanos, in the Sierra de Chepes, Sierra Ulapes, Sierra de Velasco and Sierra Brava.

Between the original definition of "Los Estratos de Los Llanos" (Los Llanos Beds) by Bodenbender and later analysis during the twentieth century, a number of controversies arose. Rusconi (1936), Bordas (1941), Pascual (1954), Guiñazú (1962) and Zuzek (1978) assigned a Miocene age to the formation, based on mammal fossils found in the strata. This unit is presently known as the Las Mulitas Formation. The occurrence of typical Cretaceous charophytes confirms the assigned age for Los Llanos Formation.

Los Llanos Formation unconformably overlies the Permian Los Sauces Formation in the Sierra de Velasco and the Permian Patquía Formation or Ordovician granitic basement in other places. The maximum recorded thickness in the Sanagasta Geologic Park is 4 metres (13 ft), while in the region of Tama the formation reaches an estimated thickness of 150 metres (490 ft).

It comprises lightgrey and orange sandstones with basal conglomerate beds, deposited in a fluvial environment, which in the Sanagasta park is associated with hydrothermal activity. The more than 90 sauropod nests were found in direct association with these hydrothermal vents, suggesting a preferred incubation location of the mother dinosaurs.

== Paleontological significance ==
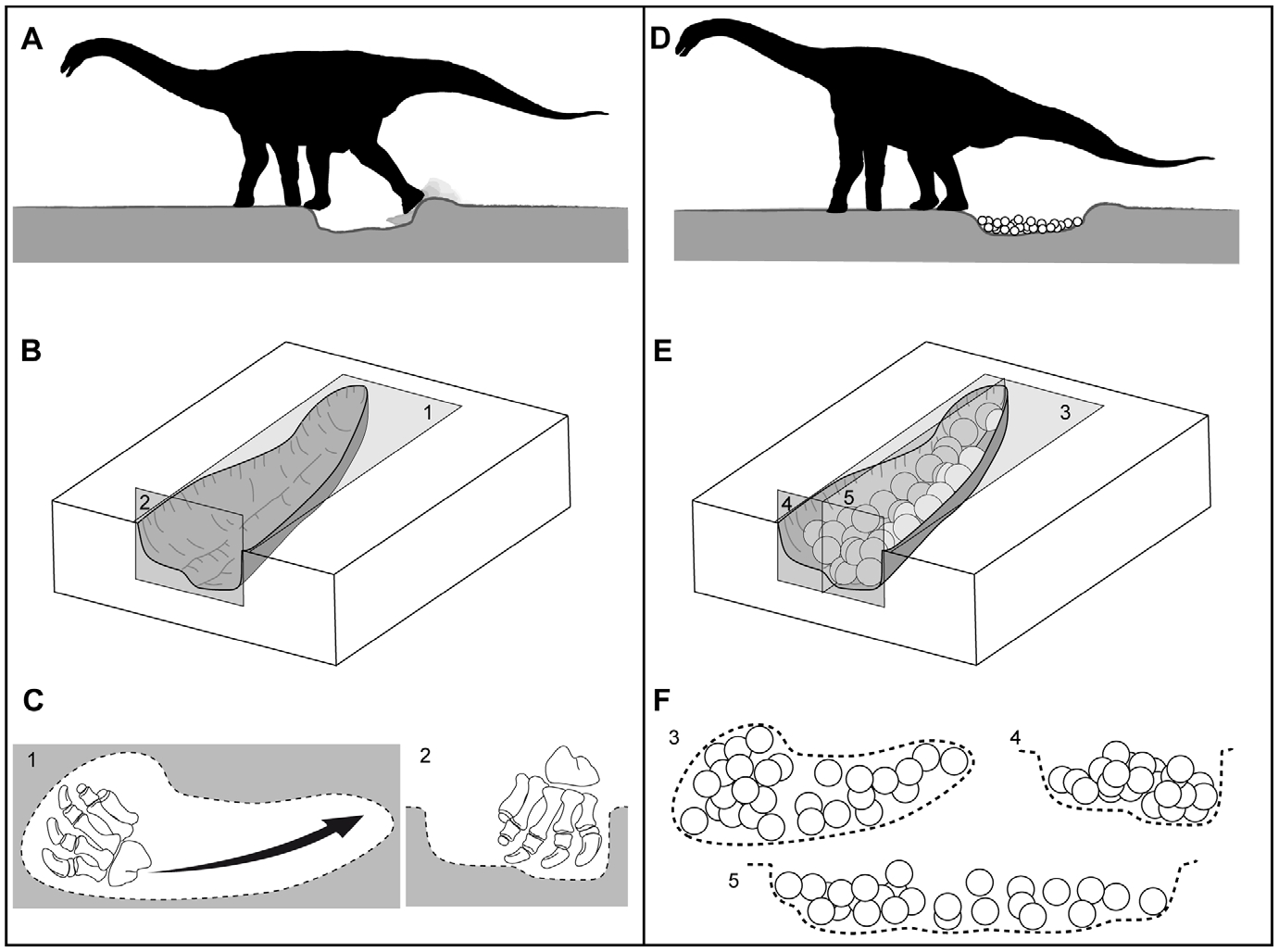
Interpretation of nest excavation and egg laying by a titanosaur

The formation has provided fossilized nesting sites attributed to a titanosaurid dinosaur. Research conducted in 2015 by Hechenleitner et al. include a comparison with the Cretaceous Sanpetru Formation of Hațeg paleo-island in Romania, the Tremp Formation of the Spanish Pre-Pyrenees and the Boseong Formation of the Gyeongsang Basin in South Korea.

=== Fossil content ===
The following fossils were reported from the formation:

==== Dinosaurs ====
Color key
| Taxon | Reclassified taxon | Taxon falsely reported as present | Dubious taxon or junior synonym | Ichnotaxon | Ootaxon | Morphotaxon |

Notes
Uncertain or tentative taxa are in small text; ~~crossed out~~ taxa are discredited.

Dinosaurs of the Los Llanos Formation
| Genus | Species | Locality | Material | Notes | Images |
|---|---|---|---|---|---|
| Aeolosaurini indet. | | | | | Vitosaura |
| Titanosauria indet. | | | | | Vitosaura |
| Abelisauridae indet. | | | | An abelisaur | Vitosaura |
| Vitosaura | V. colozacani | Tama village | A partial skeleton | An abelisaur | Vitosaura |

==== Crocodyliformes ====
Crocodyliforms of the Los Llanos Formation
| Genus | Species | Locality | Material | Notes | Images |
|---|---|---|---|---|---|
| Llanosuchus | L. tamaensis | | | | |
| Peirosauridae indet. | | | | | |

==== Oofossils ====
Egg fossils of the Los Llanos Formation
| Genus | Species | Locality | Material | Notes | Images |
|---|---|---|---|---|---|
| Faveoloolithidae | indet. | | Egg fossils | Dinosaur of uncertain affinities | |

==== Invertebrates ====
Crocodyliforms of the Los Llanos Formation
| Genus | Species | Locality | Material | Notes | Images |
|---|---|---|---|---|---|
| Ilyocypris | I. triebeli | | | An ostracod | |
| Wolburgiopsis | W. neocretacea | | | An ostracod | |

=== Flora ===
Flora of the Los Llanos Formation
| Genus | Species | Locality | Material | Notes | Images |
|---|---|---|---|---|---|
| Gobichara | G. (Pseudoharrisichara) groeberi | | | | |
| Lychnothamnus | L. (Pseudoharrisichara) tenuis | | | A stonewort | |
| Lychnothamnus | L. (Pseudoharrisichara) walpurgica | | | A stonewort | |

== See also ==
- List of dinosaur-bearing rock formations
- Allen Formation, Campanian to Maastrichtian fossiliferous formation of the Neuquén Basin
- Anacleto Formation, Campanian ooliferous formation of the Neuquén Basin
- Angostura Colorada Formation, Campanian to Maastrichtian fossiliferous formation of the North Patagonian Massif
- La Colonia Formation, Campanian to Maastrichtian formation of the Cañadón Asfalto Basin
- Colorado Formation, Campanian to Maastrichtian fossiliferous formation of the Colorado Basin
- Lago Colhué Huapí Formation, Campanian to Maastrichtian fossiliferous formation of the Golfo San Jorge Basin
