= Villaggio del Pescatore palaeontological locality =

Palaeontology

Villaggio del Pescatore
- Stratigraphic range: Campanian

Location
- Region: Friuli-Venezia Giulia
- Country: Italy

The Villaggio del Pescatore (VdP) quarry, near Duino‑Aurisina in the Trieste Karst of north‑eastern Italy, is one of the most important Upper Cretaceous fossil localities in Europe and the Mediterranean region. It is a rare Konservat‑Lagerstätte preserving a diverse vertebrate and arthropod fauna within shallow‑water carbonates of the Adriatic–Dinaric Carbonate Platform.

== Location and geological setting ==
Villaggio del Pescatore lies on the Trieste Karst plateau, within Upper Cretaceous limestones traditionally referred to the Liburnian Formation, part of the Adriatic–Dinaric Carbonate Platform system that fringed the Tethys Ocean. Foraminifera and lithostratigraphy place the fossil‑bearing interval in the early–lowermost middle Campanian, revising earlier interpretations that suggested a latest Cretaceous (Maastrichtian) age. Sedimentological and faunal evidence indicate a marginal, lagoonal to estuarine environment with brackish to freshwater influence, developed on a carbonate platform that was only intermittently emergent. Palaeogeographic reconstructions suggest that this platform was not a small, isolated "island", but part of more extensive emergent areas that intermittently connected the central Mediterranean region to Laurasia

=== Discovery and research history ===
The site was discovered in Upper Cretaceous–Palaeogene beds near Duino‑Aurisina about thirty years prior to its recent re‑evaluation, during quarrying activities that exposed fossil‑rich carbonate rhythmites. Early finds included fish, crustaceans, plant remains and, most famously, an articulated hadrosauroid dinosaur skeleton. The description of Tethyshadros insularis in 2009 from Villaggio del Pescatore marked the first nearly complete non‑hadrosaurid hadrosauroid known from Europe and brought the site to international prominence. Subsequent work added a small eusuchian crocodylomorph, Acynodon adriaticus, and other vertebrates to the fauna and stressed the site's global relevance. In the 2020s, detailed stratigraphic, taphonomic and osteohistological studies refined the age of the deposit, re‑interpreted the palaeoenvironment, and reassessed the supposed "island dwarf" status of some vertebrates. The Italian Geological Society now highlight Villaggio del Pescatore as the key dinosaur‑bearing locality of the Trieste Karst.

== Fossil fauna and flora ==
=== Dinosaurs ===
Villaggio del Pescatore's best‑known fossil is the hadrosauroid Tethyshadros insularis, represented by exceptionally complete, articulated skeletons. Initial interpretation suggested a small‑bodied, insular dwarf that evolved in isolation in the Tethys. New material and osteohistology, however, show that the holotype was a subadult, while a second, larger individual is somatically mature; both fall within the body‑size range of other non‑hadrosaurid Eurasian hadrosauroids, undermining the idea of strong miniaturisation in this lineage. The assemblage also provides rare data on hadrosauriform growth, biomechanics and evolution in peri‑Tethyan settings, contributing to debates about the "island rule" in Mesozoic dinosaurs. Recent discoveries in eastern Europe support the presence of an endemic clade including Telmatosaurus and Kryptohadros called Telmatosauridae, representing a radiation of Asian hadrosauroids in south-eastern Europe during Late Cretaceous

=== Crocodylomorphs ===
The site preserves multiple specimens of the hylaeochampsid eusuchian Acynodon adriaticus, a small crocodylomorph with a short, broad skull and heavily specialized durophagous dentition. Osteological and osteohistological study, integrated with the revised Campanian age of the site, places A. adriaticus in the same genus as the Spanish Acynodon iberoccitanus, refining early‑diverging eusuchian phylogeny. A 2025 study reported that the site also preserves fragmentary material of Doratodon carcharidens, an enigmatic terrestrial form with serrated teeth of uncertain collocation, considered either a notosuchian or a paralligatorid.

=== Pterosaurs ===
An incomplete pterodactyloid wing metacarpal from Villaggio del Pescatore constitutes the only known Cretaceous pterosaur remain from Italy and the sole pterosaur record from the Adriatic Carbonate Platform. With an estimated minimum length of 136 mm, it belonged to a relatively small pterodactyloid compared with typical latest Cretaceous forms. Morphology indicates it was not an azhdarchid, but instead shows a mixture of features seen in Pteranodon and more basal pterodactyloids. This find supports the view that non‑azhdarchid pterosaurs persisted into the upper Campanian–Maastrichtian worldwide, countering the idea that late Cretaceous pterosaur faunas were dominated exclusively by azhdarchids

=== Arthropods ===
These represent the first late Cretaceous records of such taxa in the peri‑Mediterranean region and suggest the presence of new, yet‑to‑be‑formally‑named species. The co‑occurrence of palaemonid shrimps and cirolanid isopods, both typical of estuarine and lagoonal habitats, reinforces the interpretation of Villaggio del Pescatore as a brackish to freshwater setting. Abundant small decapod exuviae indicate a nursery habitat, comparable to modern euryhaline or amphidromous palaemonids, while taphonomic evidence points to the role of microbial mats in stabilizing carcasses and enhancing exceptional preservation. Closely related arthropod taxa appear in other Cretaceous Lagerstätten such as Las Hoyas (Spain) and Jehol (China), implying peri‑Tethyan biogeographical links and faunal exchange between Eurasian landmasses

=== Other fossils ===
The broader fossil assemblage includes fishes, crustaceans, and land plants, many of which are on display at the Trieste Natural History Museum, which houses the principal collection of Late Cretaceous fossils from the Trieste Karst. The combination of marine, brackish and continental elements documents a complex coastal ecosystem at the north‑western margin of the Tethys.

=== Palaeoenvironment and palaeobiogeographical significance ===
Villaggio del Pescatore provides a high‑resolution snapshot of a Campanian coastal carbonate platform that hosted both marine and terrestrial biotas. Stratigraphic and palaeontological data show that the Adriatic–Dinaric Carbonate Platform comprised broad, intermittently emergent areas, challenging simplistic portrayals of the region as a chain of small, isolated islands. The vertebrate fauna, including hadrosauroids, crocodylomorphs and pterosaurs, together with invertebrates and plants, yields critical evidence for faunal dispersal routes between the central Mediterranean and Laurasia during the Late Cretaceous. The absence of pronounced dwarfism in Tethyshadros, the close affinities of Acynodon adriaticus with Spanish forms, and occurrence of Doratodon alongside coeval sites in Austria, Hungary and Romania underscore the connectivity of European landmasses across the peri‑Tethyan realm

== Scientific and heritage importance ==
Villaggio del Pescatore is widely recognized as:

- the most significant Upper Cretaceous palaeontological site in Italy and the Mediterranean region
- the first multi‑individual, dinosaur‑dominated Konservat‑Lagerstätte in Italy
- the only source of Cretaceous pterosaur material from the Adriatic Carbonate Platform
- key reference locality for Campanian vertebrate evolution, early‑diverging eusuchians, arthropod palaeoecology, and peri‑Tethyan biogeography

Recent authors emphasize the need for continued protection and promotion of Villaggio del Pescatore as a unique geosite of international value.
