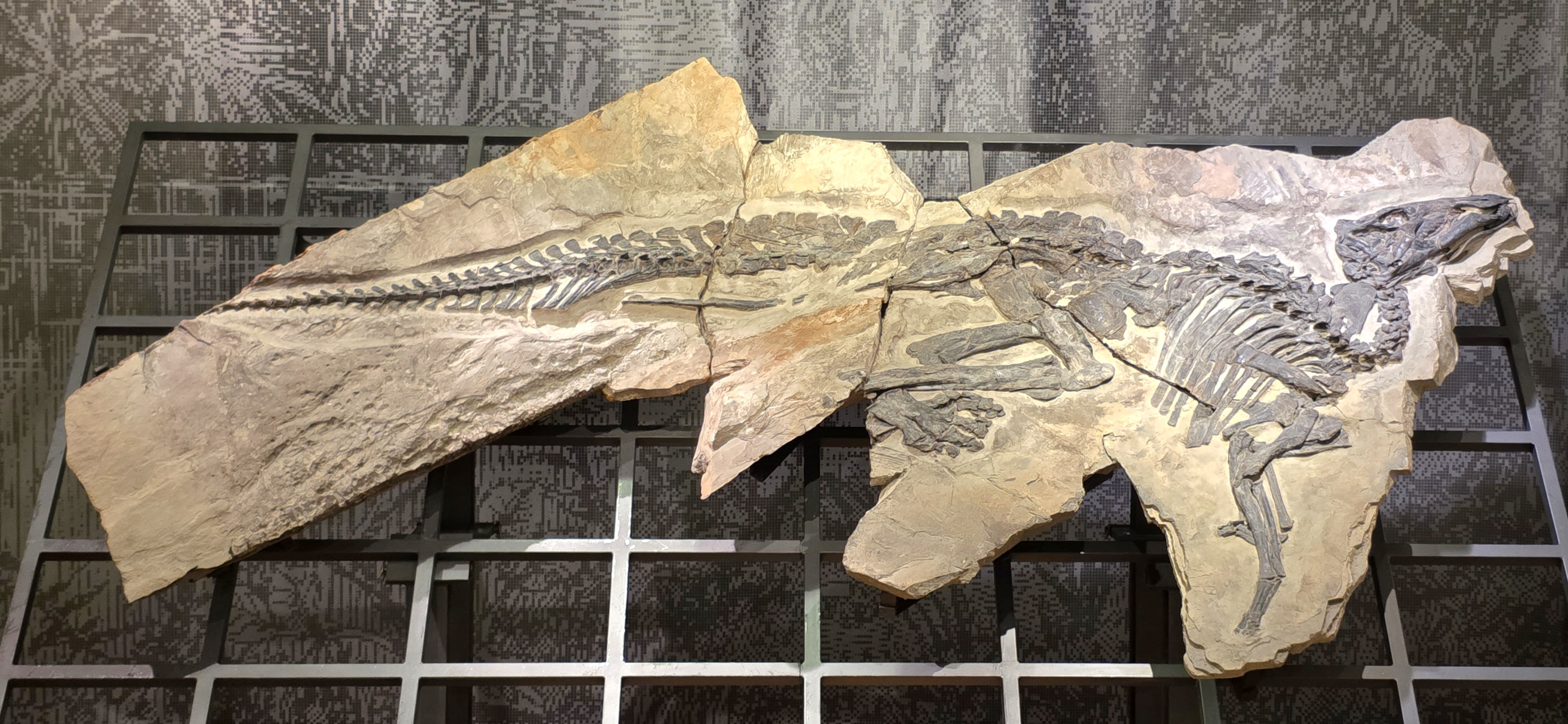
- Holotype skeleton in Natural History Museum of Trieste

Scientific classification
- Kingdom: Animalia
- Phylum: Chordata
- Class: Reptilia
- Clade: Dinosauria
- Clade: †Ornithischia
- Clade: †Ornithopoda
- Clade: †Hadrosauromorpha
- Genus: †Tethyshadros; Dalla Vecchia, 2009
- Species: †T. insularis

Binomial name
- †Tethyshadros insularis Dalla Vecchia, 2009

= Tethyshadros =

Tethyshadros Temporal range: Late Cretaceous (Campanian)81.5–80.5 Ma

Hadrosauroid dinosaur from Late Cretaceous Italy

Tethyshadros ("Tethyan hadrosauroid") is a genus of hadrosauroid dinosaur from the Late Cretaceous (Campanian) Lipica Formation (previously thought to come from the younger informal "Liburnia Formation") of Trieste, Italy. The type and only species is T. insularis.

== Discovery and naming ==
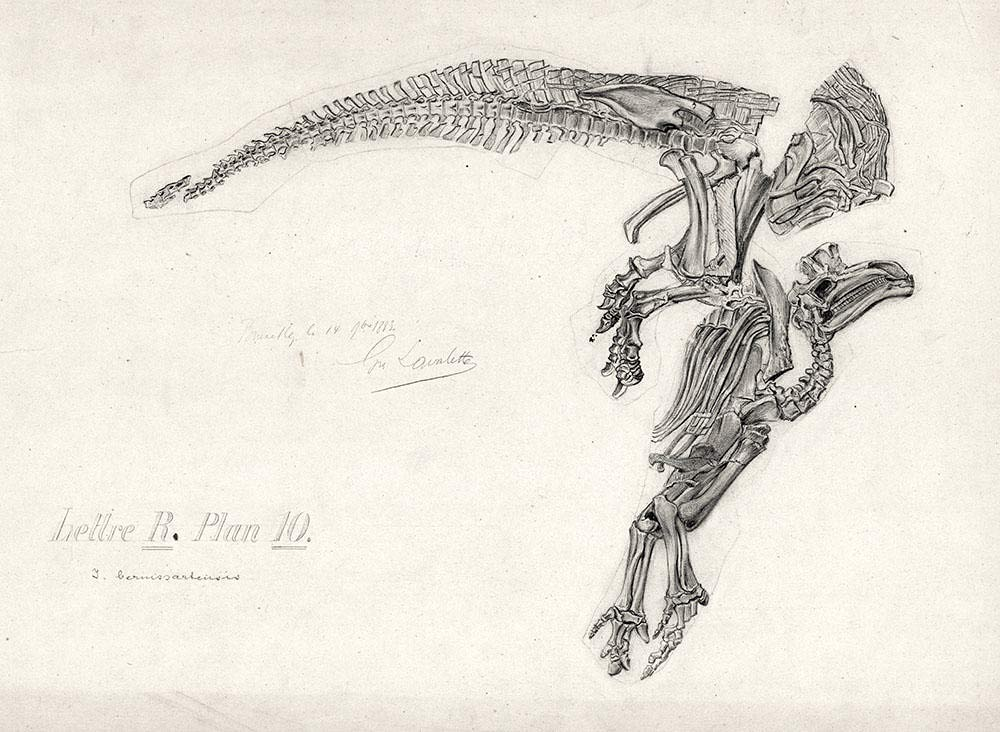
One of several Iguanodon bernissartensis skeletons discovered in 1882; the discovery of Tethyshadros was noted as the most complete large dinosaur skeleton discovered in Europe since this find (Museum of Natural Sciences, Brussels)

Sometime in the 1980s, Alceo Tarlao and Giorgio Rimoli reported finding fragments of dinosaur bone while prospecting for rare bones. The abandoned quarry these were found in was only 100m inland, at Villaggio del Pescatore, Trieste Province, Italy, in what is now known as the Villaggio del Pescatore palaeontological locality. It was from this quarry that a nearly complete hadrosaur skeleton was discovered in 1994. Lying on a vertical rockface, the specimen required a difficult excavation process, involving the removal of over 300 cubic metres of mineral and use of large equipment. Palaeontologist Fabio Della Vacchia among others served as scientific director for the excavation. Many other fossils, including various other hadrosaur specimens, were uncovered in the process. The main skeleton was not extracted until 1999. The significance of the find was immediately recognized, being the oldest hadrosaur known from the Europe and the most complete large dinosaur skeleton found on the continent since the 19th century discovery of Iguanodon remains at Bernissart, Belgium. The find was embedded in a fossil-bearing chalkstone lens, measuring ten metres thick and seventy metres in diameter. This lens were tougth to pertain to the Liburnia Formation. Based on the presence of foraminiferan Murciella cuvillieri and hylaeochampsid Acynodon, in addition to geologic data, the hadrosaur fossil dated to the Campanian-Maastrichtian boundary, around 70 million years ago., an age recently re-evaluated by more recent studies to 81.5-80.5 million years ago and to the Lipica Formation.

Upon the completion of excavation, the five tonne block containing the specimen proved too large for transportation. As such, it was separated into six separate blocks; these blocks were then further reduced in size by cutting off sections of rock containing none of the fossil. Once finally recovered, it was brought to the Museo Civico di Storia Naturale di Trieste (MCSNT) in the city of Trieste, though it was catalogued as property of the Italian State (SI) rather than under the museum. There, the specimen underwent 2800 hours of preparation (the process of removing the fossil from the rock matrix). This done was done through spraying diluted formic acid capable of dissolving the surrounding rock but not the fossil, which had a different chemical composition. Such spraying treatments were done in hour long sessions, followed by rinsing and preservation of removed bones with a special resin. This process was finished in December 2000, when the specimen was publicly presented. It was at this point that the specimen gained the nickname "Antonio", given to it in press reports. In 2004, a book on dinosaurs in Italy by Cristiano Dal Sasso was published which dedicated a chapter to the subject of the hadrosaurs from Trieste. The Villaggio del Pescatore site is one of very traces of dinosaurs ever found in the country. The only others are the single exceptional specimen of the tiny theropod Scipionyx (discovered one year earlier than Antonio), a theropod from Saltrio, and some footprints belonging to various groups.

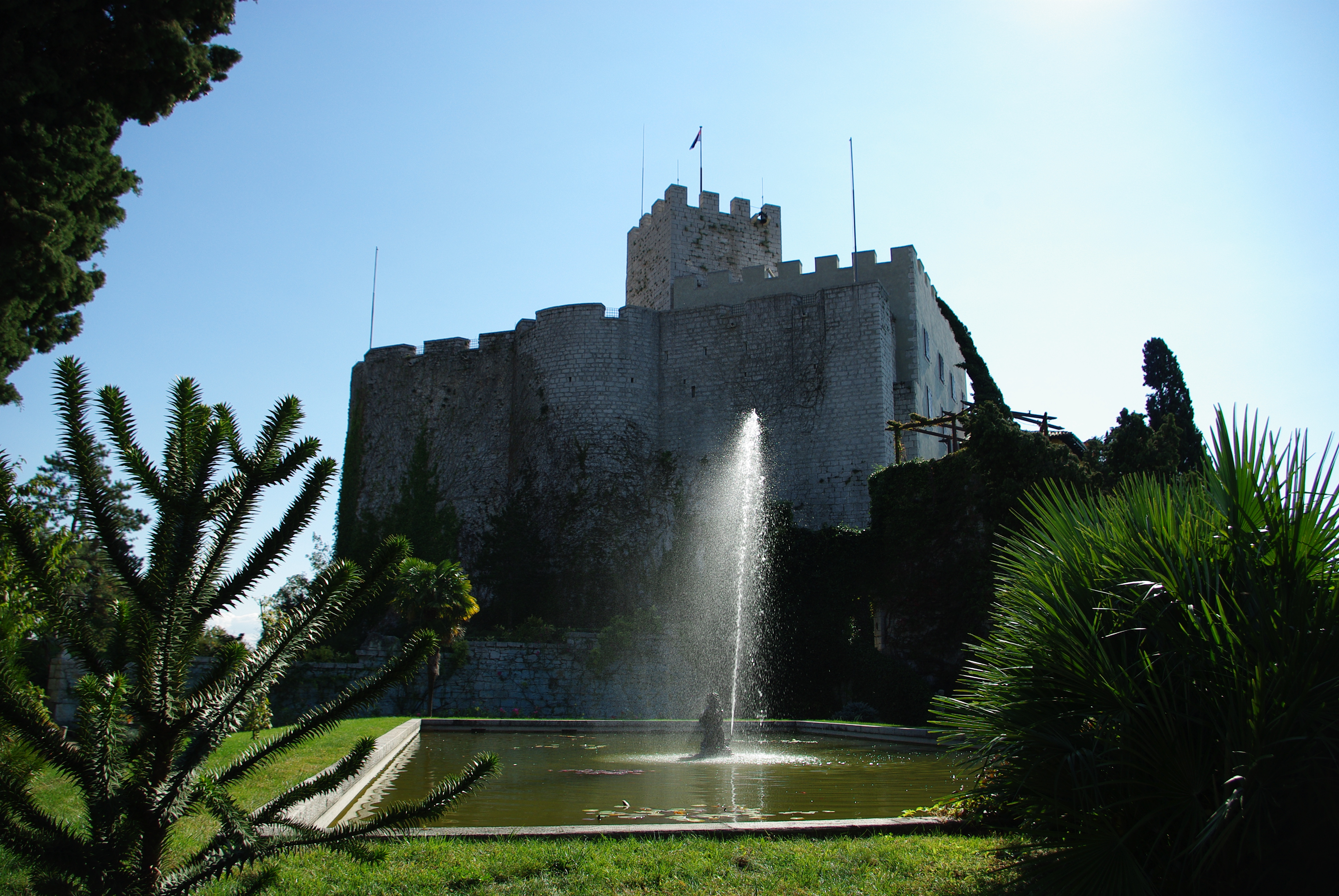
Duino Castle, where the "Bruno" specimen was displayed

The genus was named and described by Dalla Vecchia in 2009. Its only and type species is Tethyshadros insularis. The genus name refers to the Tethys Ocean and the Hadrosauroidea. The specific name means "insular" or "of the island" in Latin, a reference to the fact that species would have lived on one of the larger islands of the European Archipelago. The holotype of the genus is SC 57021 (Antonio), a mostly complete but crushed skeleton. An additional extensive skeleton of Tethyshadros was found at this site, SC 57247, nicknamed "Bruno". It consists of a complete skull and extensive postcranial remains. "Bruno" was not prepared until 2019, at which point images were posted online and the specimen was publicly displayed at the Duino Castle through the winter of that year and 2020. Numerous other specimens from the site were also referred to the species; SC 57022 (partial forelimbs; potentially from a more extensive unrecovered skeleton), SC 57023 (isolated left pubis), SC 57025 (isolated cervical vertebra and rib), SC 57026 (complete skull and partial postcranium), and SC 57256 (isolated rib), all held at the MCSNT. Each specimen was deposited in a different level of the geologic lens, so they each lived at different times; the lens is thought to have been deposited over less than 10,000 years, meaning the individuals lived a maximum of a few thousand years apart from each other. Della Vacchia published an additional description of the species, focusing on its tail anatomy specifically, in 2020, which was mostly confuted in following studies. Bruno, along with five other specimens, was formally described in 2021 by Alfio Alessandro Chiarenza and colleagues.

== Description ==
Size of Tethyshadros compared to a human

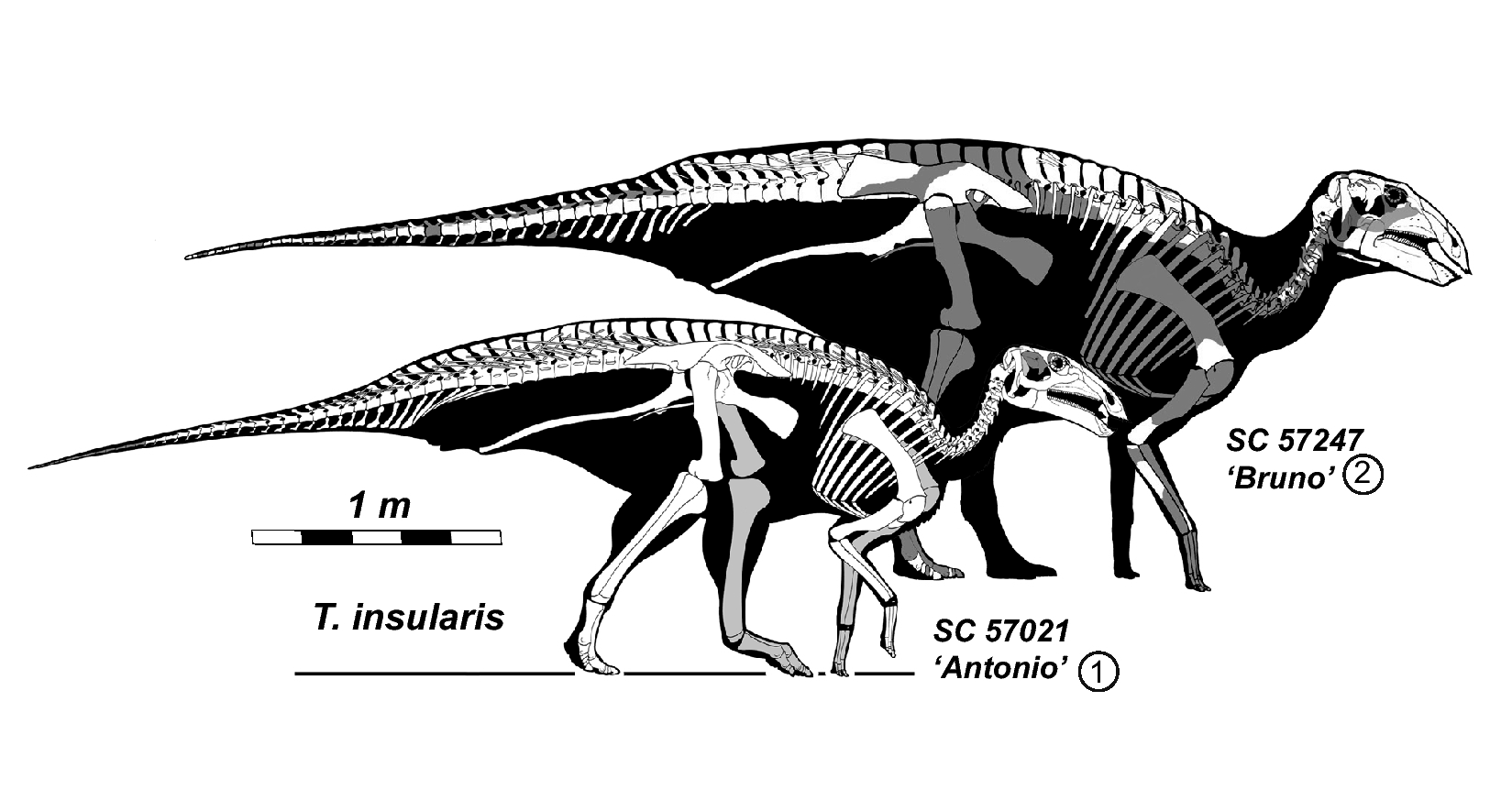
Skeletal reconstructions of two Tethyshadros specimens

Tethyshadros was originally thought to be a dwarf hadrosauroid. The preserved portion of the holotype measures 3.6 metres (12 ft), with only the end of the tail being missing. The length of the tail including the unpreserved portion was later estimated to be 2.5 metres (8.2 ft), resulting in a total estimated body length of 4.5 metres (15 ft) for the animal, though it's been argued this is an overestimate. Although the holotype Antonio was initially thought to represent an adult, it was later assessed to be a subadult individual based on the histology of its bones. Bruno, which is 15–20% larger than Antonio, was found to be an adult, and it shows features related to maturity such as a more robust skull and stouter proportions. Antonio has been estimated at 338 kilograms (745 lb) in weight, while Bruno has been estimated at 514–584 kilograms (1,133–1,287 lb).

As a hadrosauromorph, Tethyshadros was a beaked animal with a hand formed into a fleshy pad and three-toed feet. Tethyshadros has overall unique anatomy compared to its relatives. It possesses a large number of autapomorphies, or anatomical features entirely unique to this species. Specifically, it was originally described with the skull possessing seven such traits, the vertebral column seven, and the limbs six. Much of this peculiar anatomy was thought to have evolved as adaptations for the unique type of environment it lived in. Among other European relatives, Romanian specimens potentially belonging to Telmatosaurus show the most similar anatomy. Despite this, many differences between the two genera exist; Telmatosaurus is more similar to hadrosaurids, overall.

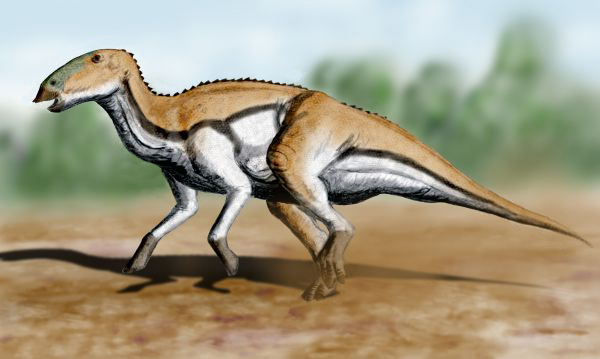
Life restoration

Another prominent aspect of Tethyshadros' anatomy is its intermediary nature – it possesses a mixture of primitive features and derived features. This is thought to be because these features were acquired gradually in the hadrosaur lineage, rather than all appearing around the same time. As such, T. insularis split form the main lineage at a point where only some of the advanced traits had evolved. In some ways the species more resembles earlier relatives like Iguanodon, such as in its general skull shape, possession of a supraorbital bone, and comparatively short neck. In others, it is more comparable to the condition seen in true hadrosaurids, such as is seen with its hand morphology, lack of an antorbital fenestra, and teeth arranged into batteries.

== Classification ==
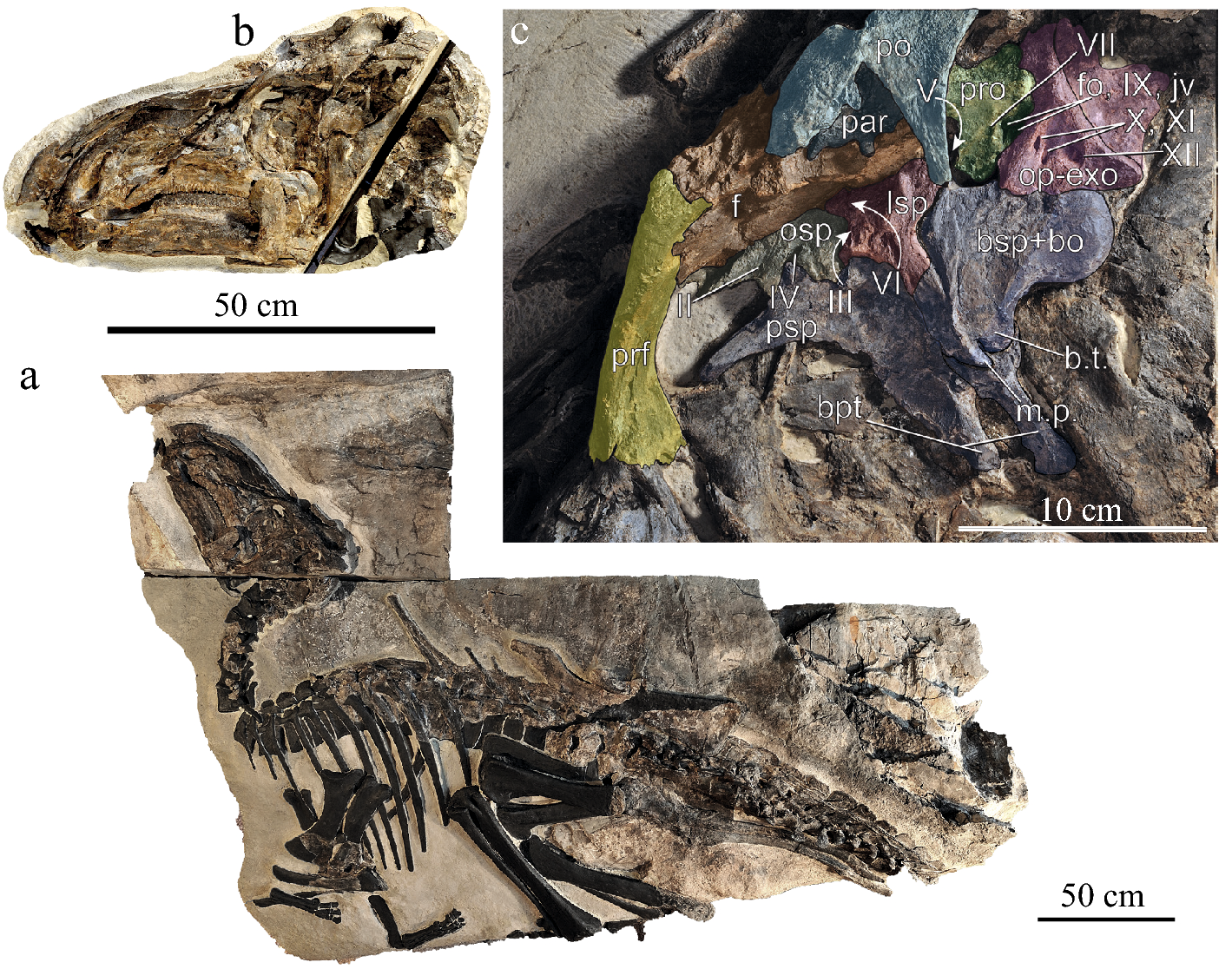
Specimen SC 57247

Before the species was described and named, the specimens were assumed to belong to a species of hadrosaurine, due to its lack of crest and assumed nature as a member of Hadrosauridae. In 2021, Prieto-Márquez and Carrera Farias recovered Tethyshadros as the sister taxon to Fylax, in a derived position in the Hadrosauromorpha, making it one of the latest surviving non-hadrosaurid hadrosauromorphs. Their cladogram is shown below:

- Hadrosauromorpha
  - - Jeyawati
    - - Eolambia
      - Protohadros
  - - Tanius
    - - Bactrosaurus
      - - Gilmoreosaurus
        - - - Lophorhothon
            - - Penelopognathus
              - Telmatosaurus
          - - Claosaurus
            - - - Fylax
                - Tethyshadros
              - - Plesiohadros
                - - Eotrachodon
                  - Hadrosauridae

Chiarenza et al. 2021 performed a phylogenetic analysis including Bruno. This analysis found Tethyshadros in a similar position within Hadrosauromorpha, except with Telmatosaurus as its closest relative. Other close relatives were generally Asian or North American species. Modelling of body size evolution suggested that Tethyshadros was not significantly different in size from its closest relatives.

In their 2026 description of the Transylvanian Kryptohadros from the Hațeg Basin, Magyar and colleagues included it in an updated version of the phylogenetic matrix of Longrich et al. (2024) and the similar but less extensive matrix of Dai et al. (2025). Both datasets consistently recovered Tethyshadros as the sister taxon to Kryptohadros. Telmatosaurus, another Hațeg genus coeval with Kryptohadros, was recovered as the sister to these two taxa using both datasets. Magyar et al. named the group containing these three genera as the new clade Telmatosauridae. The results of the majority rule consensus analysis from the former matrix are displayed in the cladogram below:

- Hadrosauromorpha
  - - Eolambia caroljonesa
    - Protohadros byrdi
  - - Yunganglong datongensis
    - - Levnesovia transoxiana
      - - Tanius sinensis
        - - Nanyangosaurus zhugeii
          - - - Bactrosaurus johnsoni
              - Fylax thyrakolasus
            - - Gilmoreosaurus mongoliensis
              - Shuangmiaosaurus gilmorei
            - - Nanningosaurus dashiensis
              - - Claosaurus agilis
                - - Telmatosauridae
                    - Telmatosaurus transsylvanicus
                    - - Kryptohadros kallaiae
                      - Tethyshadros insularis
                  - - - Plesiohadros djadokhtaensis
                      - - Gobihadros mongoliensis
                        - Penelopognathus weishampeli
                    - - Eotrachodon orientalis
                      - - Zhanghenglong yangchengensis
                        - - - Huehuecanauhtlus tiquichensis
                            - Jeyawati rugoculus
                          - Hadrosauridae
                            ⊞
                            - Hadrosaurus foulkii
                            - Euhadrosauria
                              - Saurolophinae
                                ⊞
                                - Wulagasaurus dongi
                                - - Brachylophosaurini
                                  - - Kritosaurini
                                    - - Edmontosaurini
                                      - Saurolophini
                                ⊟
                              - Lambeosaurinae
                                ⊞
                                - Aralosaurus tuberiferus
                                - Jaxartosaurus aralensis
                                - Nipponosaurus sachalinensis
                                - - Tsintaosaurus spinorhinus
                                  - - Arenysaurini
                                    - Corythosauria
                                      - Lambeosaurini
                                      - Parasaurolophini
                                ⊟
                            ⊟

== See also ==
- Timeline of hadrosaur research
- 2009 in paleontology
