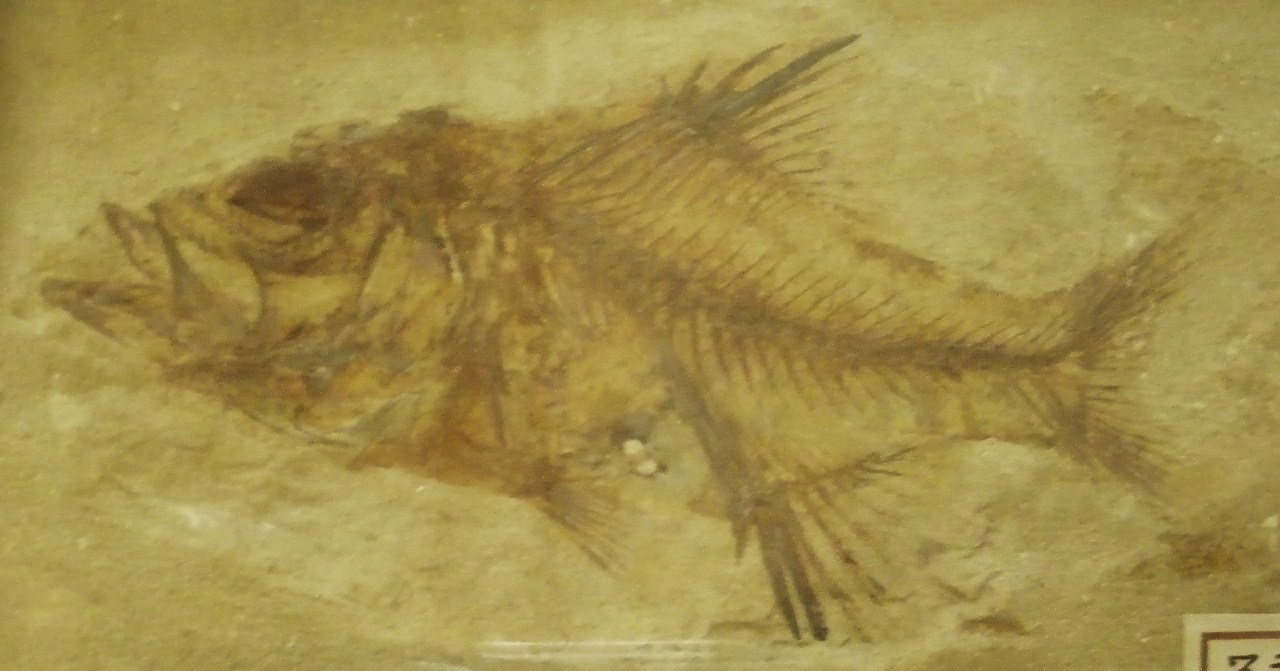

Scientific classification
- Domain: Eukaryota
- Kingdom: Animalia
- Phylum: Chordata
- Class: Actinopterygii
- Order: Perciformes
- Genus: †Sphenocephalus; Agassiz, 1839

= Sphenocephalus =

Sphenocephalus Temporal range: Late Cretaceous

Extinct genus of fishes

Sphenocephalus (from Greek: σφήν sphḗn, 'wedge' and Greek: κεφαλή kephalḗ 'head') is an extinct genus of ray-finned fish that lived during the Cretaceous period. Fossils have been found in England and Italy.

Sphenocephalus was about 20 centimetres (8 in) long, with a rather large head, and may have resembled a modern black bass in appearance. It was one of the earliest fish to have the pelvic fins placed beneath th pectoral fins, a common feature in modern fish that improves swimming manoeuvrability. Like the modern trout-perches, it possessed a mixture of modern and primitive features, and it was probably one of the earliest perciform fish.
