= Marnes bleues =

Geologic formation in France

- Stratigraphic range: Albian
- Type: Formation

Location
- Country: France

The Marnes bleues is a geologic formation in France. It preserves fossils dating back to the Cretaceous period.

== See also ==
- List of fossiliferous stratigraphic units in France
