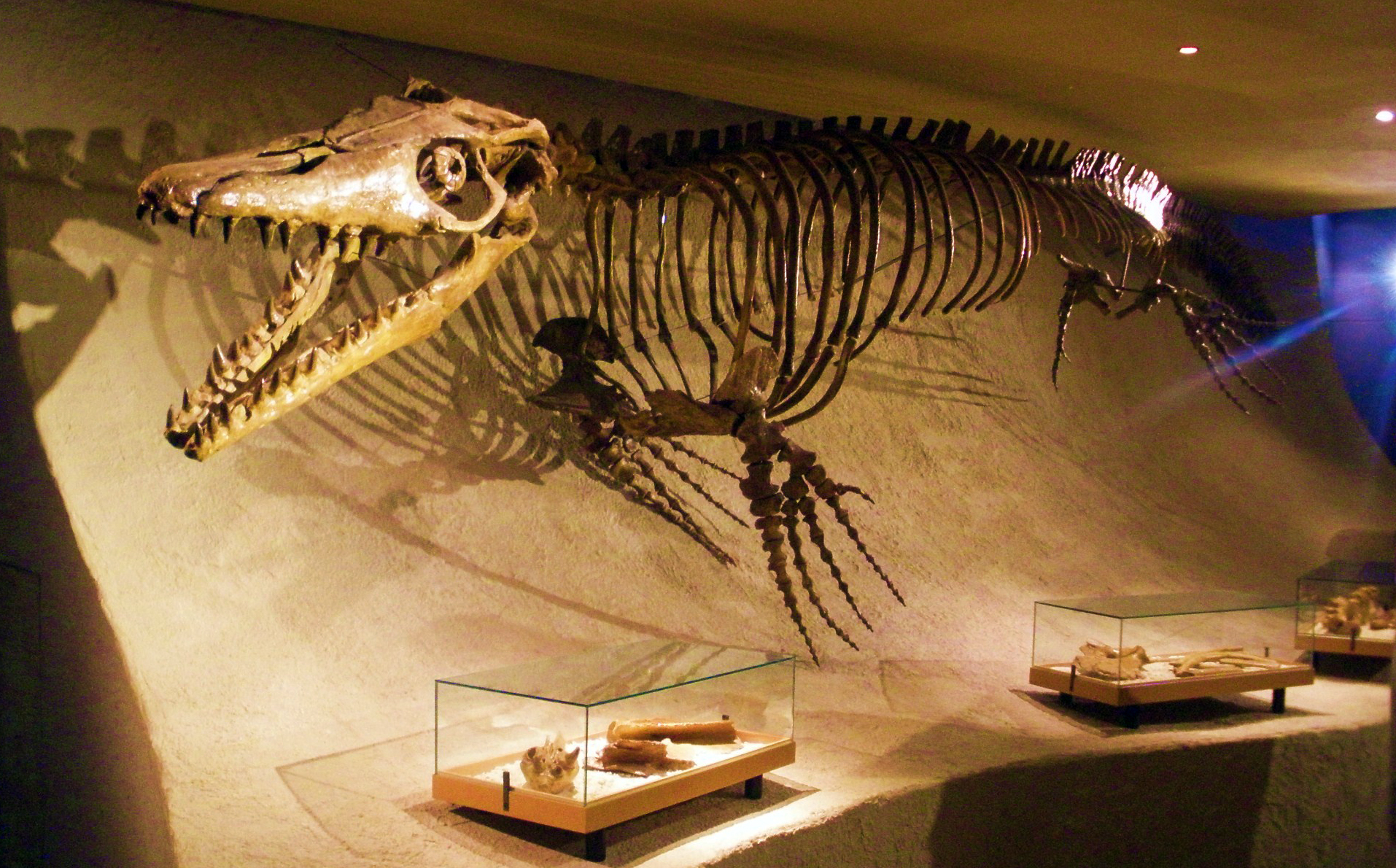
- Reconstructed skeleton of M. hoffmanni at the Maastricht Natural History Museum

Scientific classification
- Kingdom: Animalia
- Phylum: Chordata
- Class: Reptilia
- Order: Squamata
- Clade: †Mosasauria
- Family: †Mosasauridae
- Tribe: †Mosasaurini
- Genus: †Mosasaurus; Conybeare, 1822

Type species
- †Mosasaurus hoffmanni Mantell, 1829

Other species
- †M. missouriensis (Harlan, 1834); †M. conodon (Cope, 1881); †M. lemonnieri (Dollo, 1889); †M. beaugei Arambourg, 1952; Species pending reassessment: †M. mokoroa Welles & Gregg, 1971; †M. hobetsuensis Suzuki, 1985; †M. flemingi Wiffen, 1990; †M. prismaticus Sakurai et al., 1999

Synonyms
- List of synonyms: Synonyms of genus; Batrachiosaurus Harlan, 1839; Batrachiotherium Harlan, 1839; Macrosaurus Owen, 1849; Drepanodon Leidy, 1856; Lesticodus Leidy, 1859; Baseodon Leidy, 1865; Nectoportheus Cope, 1868; Pterycollosaurus Dollo, 1882 Synonyms of M. hoffmannii; Lacerta gigantea von Sömmerring, 1820; Mososaurus hoffmannii Mantell, 1829; Mosasaurus belgicus Holl, 1829; Mosasaurus camperi Meyer, 1832; Mosasaurus dekayi Bronn, 1838; Mosasaurus hoffmanni Owen, 1840; Mosasaurus major De Kay, 1842; Mosasaurus occidentalis Morton, 1844; Mosasaurus meirsii Marsh, 1869; Mosasaurus princeps Marsh, 1869; Mosasaurus maximus Cope, 1869; Mosasaurus giganteus Cope, 1869; Mosasaurus fulciatus Cope, 1869; Mosasaurus oarthus Cope, 1869 Synonyms of M. missouriensis; Ichthyosaurus missouriensis Harlan, 1834; Ictiosaurus missuriensis Harlan, 1834; Batrachiosaurus missouriensis Harlan, 1839; Batrachiotherium missouriensis Harlan, 1839; Mosasaurus maximiliani Goldfuss, 1845; Mosasaurus neovidii Meyer, 1845; Pterycollosaurus maximiliani Dollo, 1882; Mosasaurus horridus Williston, 1895 Synonyms of M. conodon; Clidastes conodon Cope, 1881

= Mosasaurus =

Mosasaurus Temporal range: Campanian-Maastrichtian, 82.7–66.0 Ma

Extinct genus of marine lizard from the Late Cretaceous

Mosasaurus (/ˌmoʊzəˈsɔːrəs/; "lizard of the Meuse River") is the type genus (defining example) of the Mosasauridae, an extinct group of aquatic squamate reptiles. It lived from about 82 to 66 million years ago during the Campanian and Maastrichtian stages of the Late Cretaceous. The genus was one of the first Mesozoic marine reptiles known to science—the first fossils of Mosasaurus were found as skulls in a chalk quarry near the Dutch city of Maastricht in the late 18th century, and were initially thought to be crocodiles or whales. One skull discovered in 1778 was famously nicknamed the "great animal of Maastricht". In 1808, naturalist Georges Cuvier concluded that it belonged to a giant marine lizard with similarities to monitor lizards but otherwise unlike any known living animal. This concept was revolutionary at the time and helped support the then-developing ideas of extinction. Cuvier did not designate a scientific name for the animal; this was done by William Daniel Conybeare in 1822 when he named it Mosasaurus in reference to its origin in fossil deposits near the Meuse River. The exact affinities of Mosasaurus as a squamate remain controversial, and scientists continue to debate whether its closest living relatives are monitor lizards or snakes.

The largest species, M. hoffmanni, is estimated to measure up to 12 meters (39 ft) in maximum length. The skull of Mosasaurus had robust jaws and strong muscles capable of powerful bites using dozens of large teeth adapted for cutting prey. Its four limbs were shaped into paddles to steer the animal underwater. Its tail was long and ended in a downward bend and a paddle-like fluke. Mosasaurus possessed excellent vision to compensate for its poor sense of smell, and a high metabolic rate suggesting it was endothermic ("warm-blooded"), an adaptation in squamates only found in mosasaurs. There is considerable morphological variability across the currently-recognized species in Mosasaurus—from the robustly-built M. hoffmanni to the slender and serpentine M. lemonnieri—but an unclear diagnosis (description of distinguishing features) of the type species M. hoffmanni led to a historically problematic classification. As a result, more than fifty species have been attributed to the genus in the past. A redescription of the type specimen in 2017 helped resolve the taxonomy issue and confirmed at least four other species to be within the genus. Another five species still nominally classified within Mosasaurus are planned to be reassessed.

Fossil evidence suggests Mosasaurus inhabited much of the Atlantic Ocean and the adjacent seaways. Mosasaurus fossils have been found in North and South America, Europe, Africa, Western Asia, and Antarctica. This distribution encompassed a wide range of oceanic climates including tropical, subtropical, temperate, and subpolar. Mosasaurus was a common large predator in these oceans and was positioned at the top of the food chain. Paleontologists believe its diet would have included virtually any animal; it likely preyed on bony fish, sharks, cephalopods, birds, and other marine reptiles including sea turtles and other mosasaurs. It likely preferred to hunt in open water near the surface. From an ecological standpoint, Mosasaurus probably had a profound impact on the structuring of marine ecosystems; its arrival in some locations such as the Western Interior Seaway in North America coincides with a complete turnover of faunal assemblages and diversity. Mosasaurus faced competition with other large predatory mosasaurs such as Prognathodon and Tylosaurus—which were known to feed on similar prey—though they were able to coexist in the same ecosystems through niche partitioning. There were still conflicts among them, as an instance of Tylosaurus attacking a Mosasaurus has been documented. Several fossils document deliberate attacks on Mosasaurus individuals by members of the same species. Fighting likely took place in the form of snout grappling, as seen in modern crocodiles.

== Research history ==
=== Discovery and identification ===
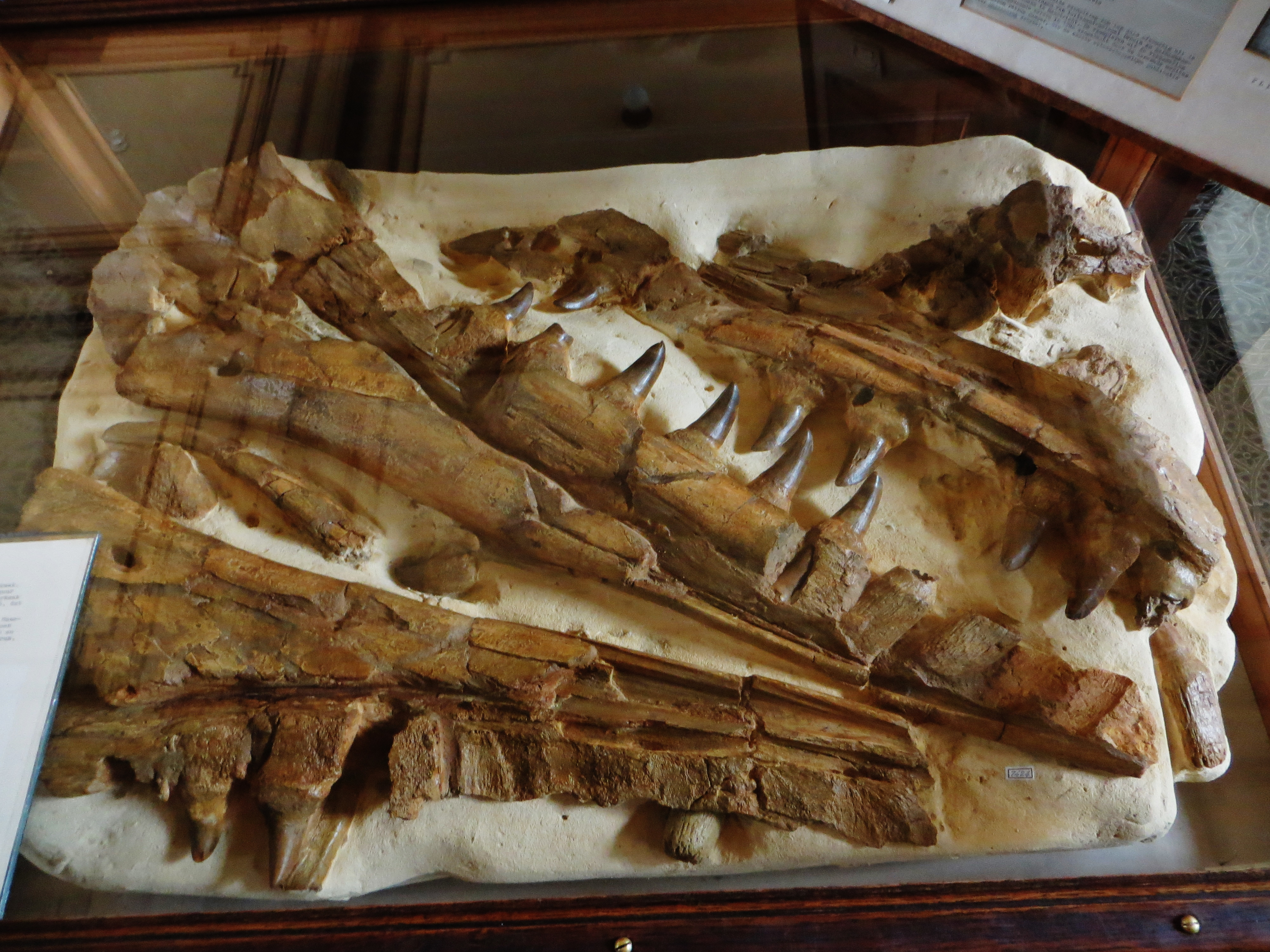
TM 7424, the first known specimen of M. hoffmanni

The first Mosasaurus fossil known to science was discovered in 1764 in a chalk quarry near Maastricht in the Netherlands in the form of a skull, which was initially identified as a whale. This specimen, cataloged as TM 7424, is now on display at the Teylers Museum in Haarlem. Later, in 1778, (Note: The exact year had previously not been fully certain due to multiple contradicting claims. An examination of existing historical evidence conducted in 2012 by Florence F. J. M. Pieters and colleagues suggests that the most precise date would be around 1780. More recently, Limburg newspapers reported in 2015 that Ernst Homburg discovered a Liège magazine from the time reporting in detail the discovery of the second skull in October 1778.) the quarry produced a second skull that caught the attention of Johann Leonard Hoffmann, who thought it was a crocodile. He then contacted Petrus Camper, and the skull gained international attention after Camper published a study identifying it as a whale in 1786. This caught the attention of French revolutionaries, who looted the fossil following the siege of Maastricht during the French Revolutionary Wars in 1794. After its seizure, the specimen was sent to the National Museum of Natural History, France in 1795 and later numbered as MNHN AC 9648. In a 1799 narrative of this event by Barthélemy Faujas de Saint-Fond, the skull was allegedly retrieved by twelve grenadiers in exchange for an offer of 600 bottles of wine. This story helped elevate the fossil into cultural fame, but historians agree that the narrative was exaggerated.

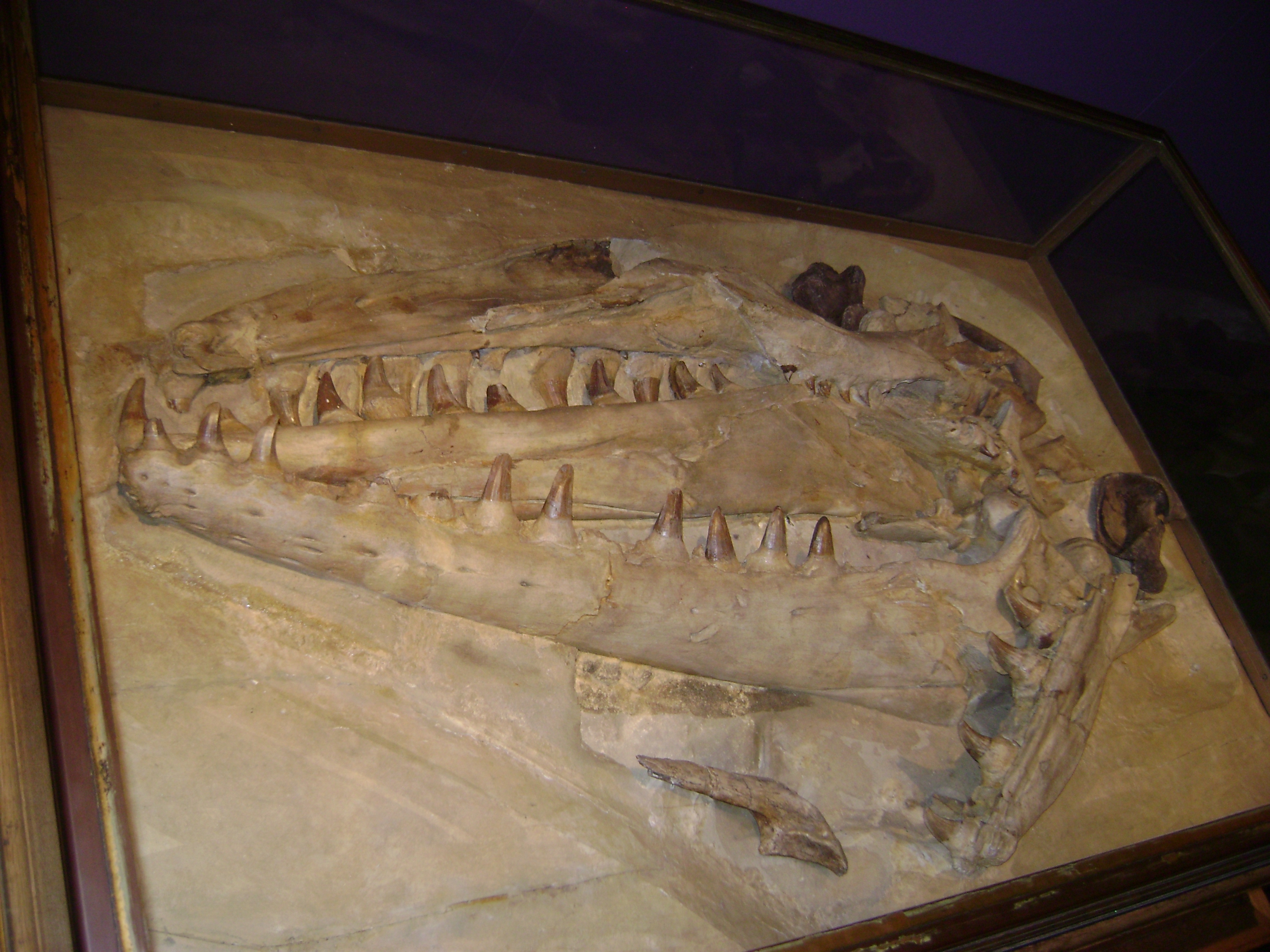
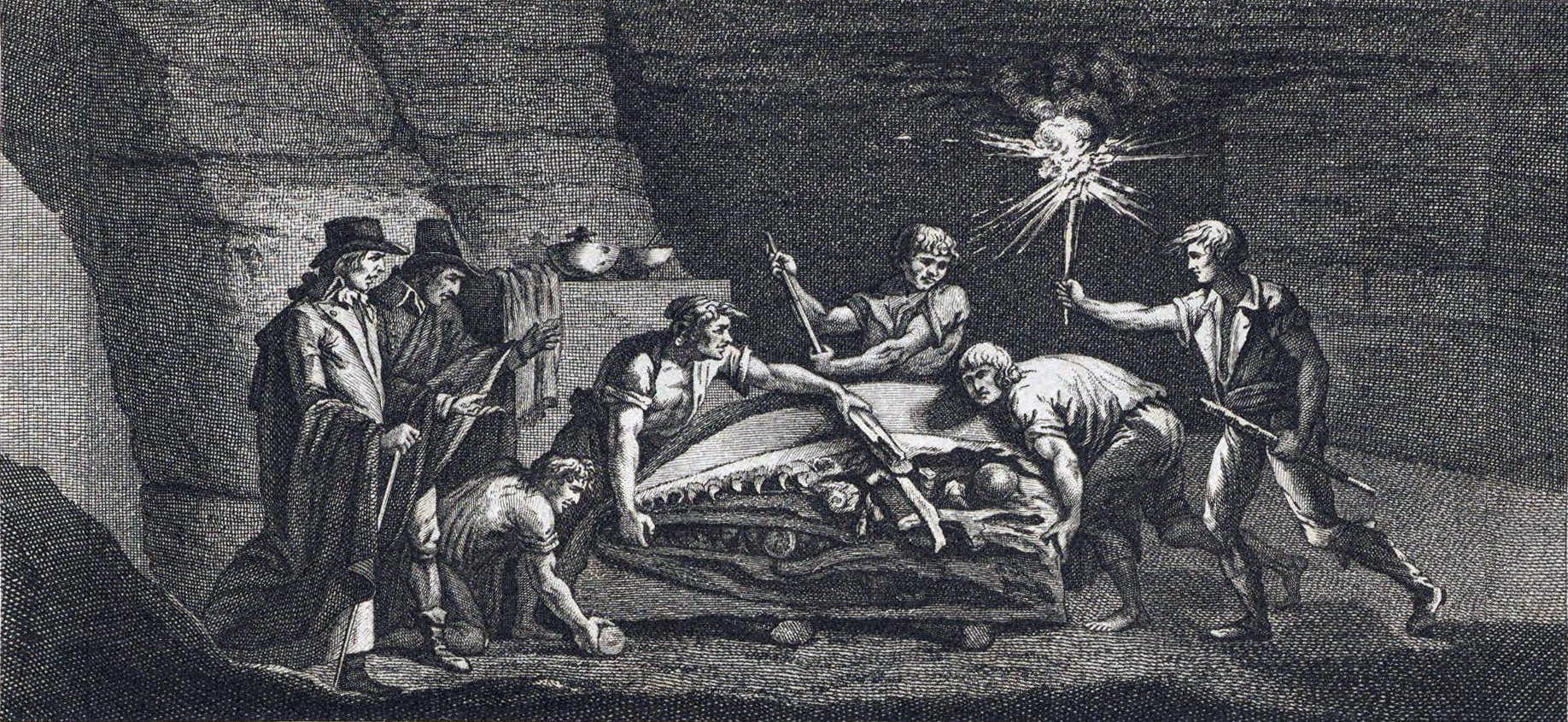
MNHN AC 9648, the second skull and holotype of M. hoffmannii, which was nicknamed the "great animal of Maastricht" (left) and Faujas' 1799 interpretation of its excavation (right)

By 1800, Camper's son Adriaan Gilles Camper concluded that the second skull, which by then was nicknamed the "great animal of Maastricht", belonged to a marine reptile sharing affinities to monitor lizards. This interpretation was confirmed by Georges Cuvier in a more detailed study published in 1808, in which he nevertheless established that it represented an extinct form not corresponding to any known living saurian. The skull became part of Cuvier's first speculations about the conception of extinction, which later led to his theory of catastrophism, a precursor to the theory of evolution. At the time, it was not believed that a species could go extinct, and fossils of animals were often interpreted as some form of an extant species. Cuvier's idea that there existed an animal unlike any today was revolutionary at the time, and in 1812 he proclaimed:

Above all, the precise determination of the famous animal from Maastricht seems to us as important for the theory of zoological laws, as for the history of the globe.

— Georges Cuvier

In a 1822 book by James Parkinson, William Daniel Conybeare coined the genus Mosasaurus from the Latin Mosa "Meuse" and the Ancient Greek σαῦρος (saûros, "lizard"), in reference to the river near which the fossils were discovered. In 1829, Gideon Mantell added the specific epithet hoffmanni, in honor to Hoffmann. (Note: hoffmannii was the original spelling used by Mantell, ending with -ii. Later authors began to drop the final letter and spelled it as hoffmanni, as became the trend for specific epithets of similar structure in later years. Recent scientists argue that the special etymological makeup of hoffmannii cannot be subjected to International Code of Zoological Nomenclature Articles 32.5, 33.4, or 34, which would normally protect similar respellings. This makes hoffmannii the valid spelling, although hoffmanni continues to be incorrectly used by many authors.) Later, the second skull is designated as the new species' holotype (defining example).

=== Later discoveries and other species ===
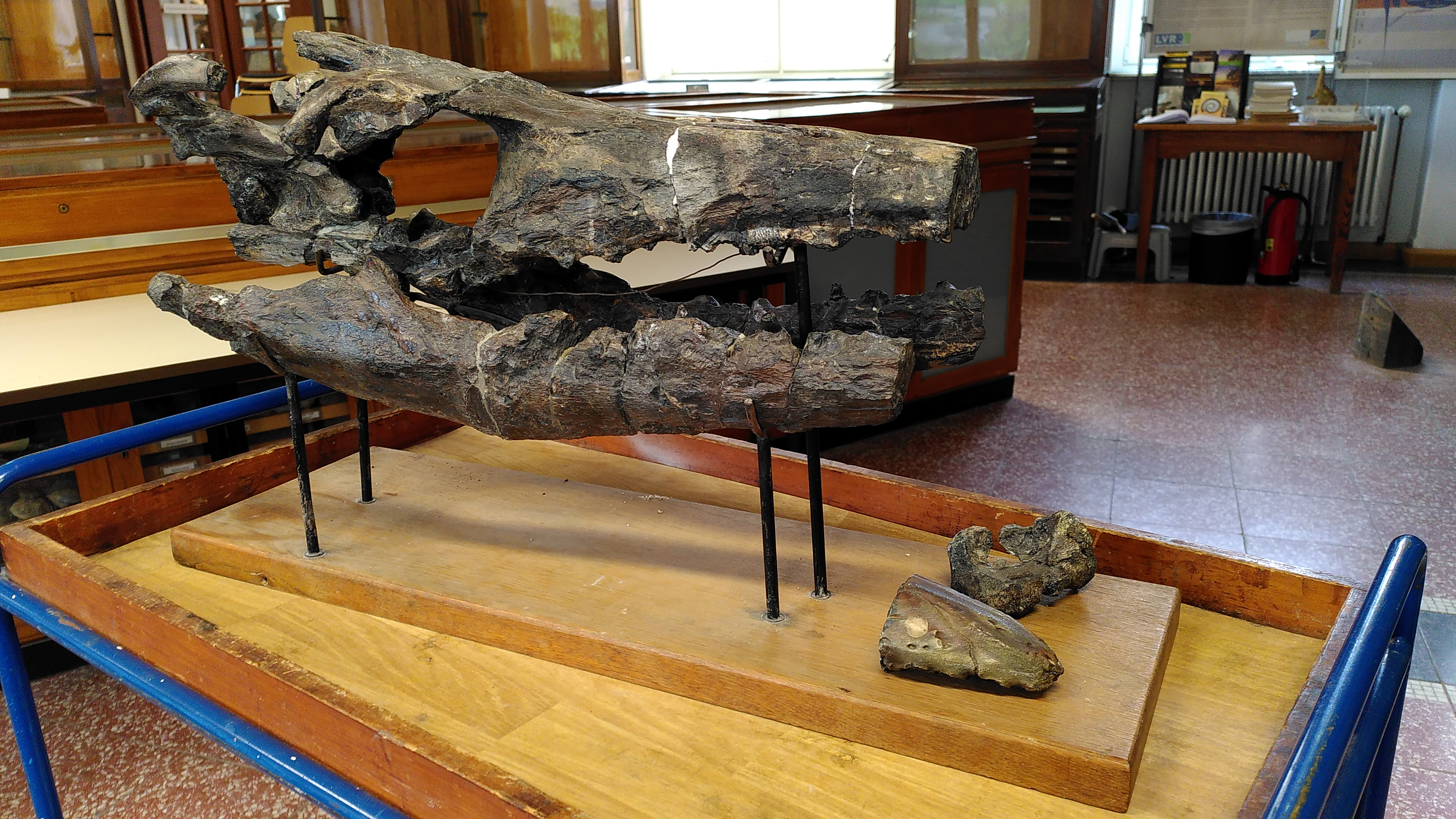
M. missouriensis holotype, with the Goldfuss skull (RFWUIP 1327) mounted and a cast of the Harlan snout (MNHN 9587) below

In 1804, the Lewis and Clark Expedition discovered a now-lost fossil skeleton alongside the Missouri River, which was identified as a 49-foot (15 m) long fish. Richard Ellis speculated in 2003 that this may have been the earliest discovery of the second species M. missouriensis, although competing speculations exist. In 1818, a fossil from Monmouth County, New Jersey became the first North American specimen to be correctly recognized as a Mosasaurus by scientists of the time. (Note: Because the genus Mosasaurus was not coined at the time, the original identifier, Samuel L. Mitchill, described the fossil as a lizard monster or saurian animal resembling the famous fossil reptile of Maestricht [sic]." Cuvier doubted whether the two specimens were related. The congeneric relationship was eventually confirmed by James Ellsworth De Kay in 1830, and the New Jersey fossil was named Mosasaurus dekayi in his honor. The taxon was declared as a nomen dubium in 2005, and other fossils attributed to it were reidentified as M. hoffmannii.)

The type specimen of M. missouriensis was first described in 1834 by Richard Harlan based on a snout fragment found near the river's Big Bend, in South Dakota. In reference to its discovery made in the river, he coined the specific epithet and initially identified it as a species of Ichthyosaurus but later as an amphibian named Batrachiosaurus. The rest of the specimen, consisting of a nearly complete skull and a few vertebrae previously discovered by a fur-trapper, came into the possession of Maximilian of Weid-Neuwied between 1832 and 1834. Since cataloged as RFWUIP 1327, this fossil material was subsequently delivered to Georg August Goldfuss in Bonn for research, who published a study in 1845. The same year, Christian Erich Hermann von Meyer suspected that the skull and Harlan's snout were part of the same individual. Although the snout was noted as lost at the time, Joseph Leidy erected the new combination M. missouriensis after this suggestion in 1857, which has since entered common use. The snout was finally found in 2004 in the collections of the MNHN under the catalog number MNHN 9587, thus confirming the initial suspicion expressed by von Meyer and followed by other authors.

M. conodon was indirectly described for the first time in 1881 by Edward Drinker Cope based on a fragmentary skeleton discovered in New Jersey, now catalogued as AMNH 1380. Due to the gracile morphology of the fossil elements composing it, Cope considered these remains to belong to a new large species of Clidastes, which he named Clidastes conodon. Although he did not provide the etymology for the specific epithet conodon, it is suggested that it could be a portmanteau meaning "conical tooth", derived from the Ancient Greek κῶνος (kônos, "cone") and ὀδών (odṓn, "tooth"), probably in reference to conical surface teeth smooth of the species. In a 1966 study, Donald Baird and Gerard R. Case transferred the species to the genus Mosasaurus based on a then-unpublished interpretation by Dale A. Russell, which he later confirmed in his monograph published the following year.

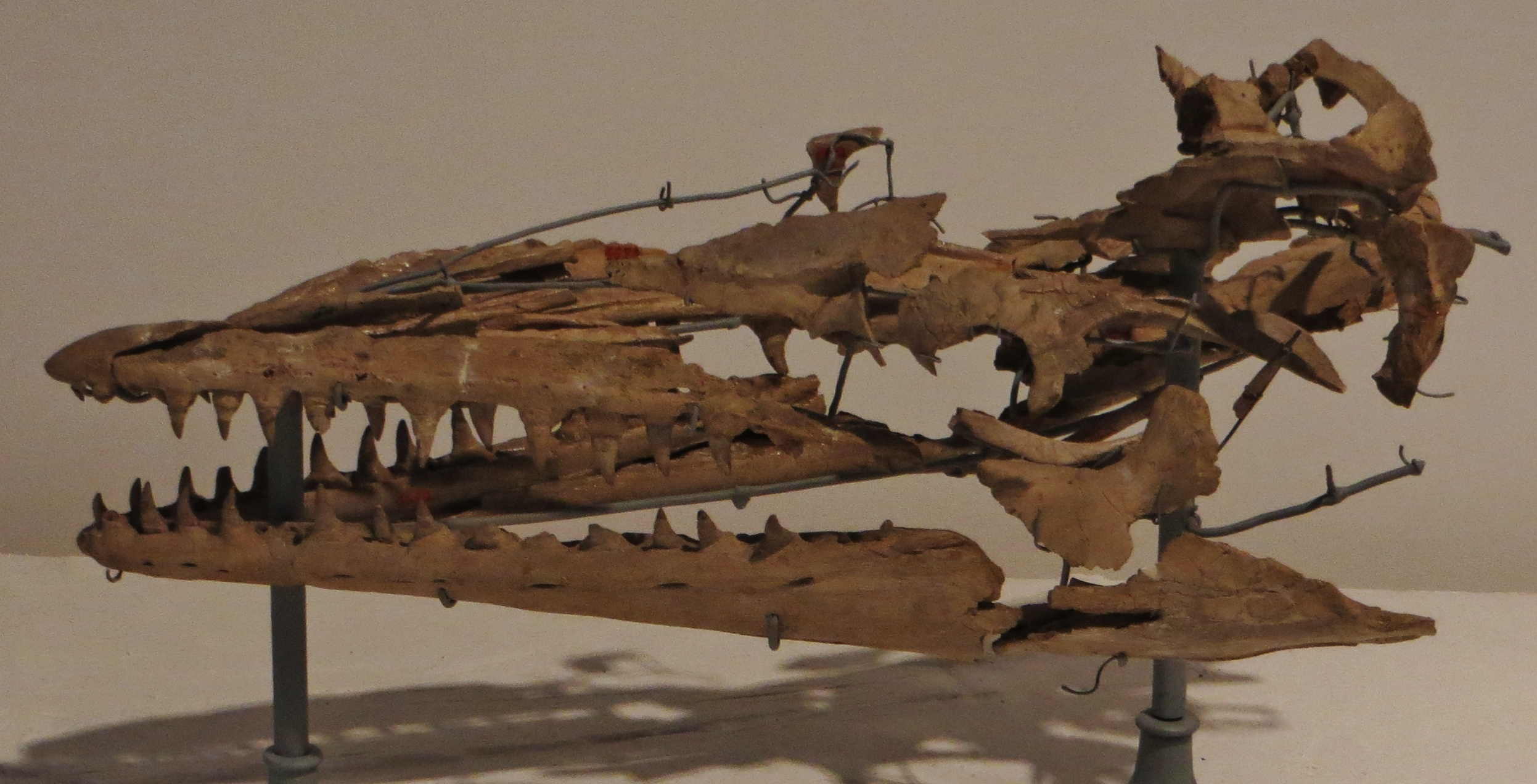
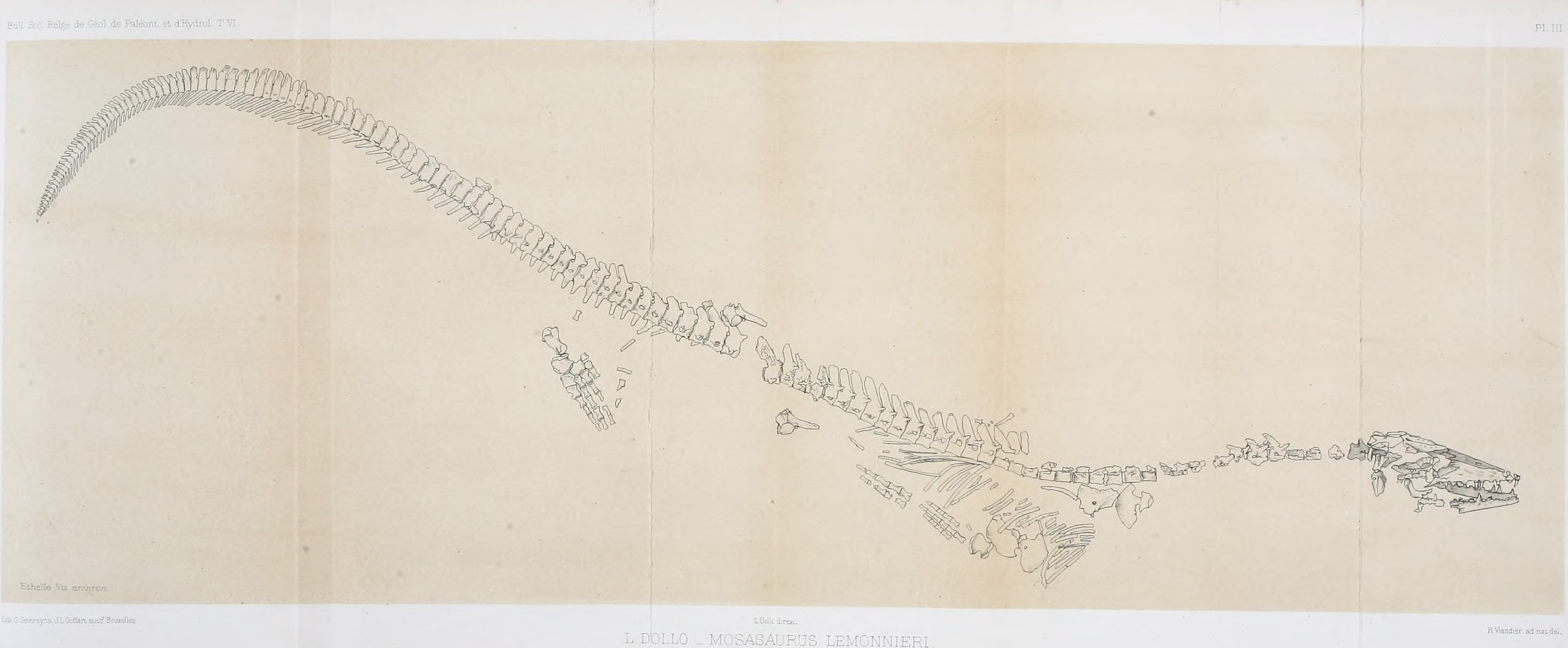
IRSNB R 28, M. lemonnieri holotype skull (top), and a 1892 drawing of IRSNB R 29, one of many referred specimens of the species described by Dollo (bottom)

M. lemonnieri was first described in 1889 by Louis Dollo based on a specimen comprising a relatively complete skull and several cervical (neck) vertebrae, discovered in a quarry owned by the Solvay S.A. company in the Ciply Basin of Mesvin, Belgium. This specimen, since numbered as IRSNB R28, is one of the many fossils donated by the then director of the company, Alfred Lemonnier, Dollo naming the species in his honor. Further mining of the quarry in subsequent years uncovered many additional well-preserved fossils, including multiple partial skeletons which collectively represented nearly the entire skeleton of the species. They were described by Dollo in later papers. Despite being one of the best anatomically represented species, M. lemonnieri was largely ignored in scientific literature. Theagarten Lingham-Soliar suggested two reasons for this neglect in 2000. First, M. lemonnieri fossils are often known to Belgium and the Netherlands, which despite the famous discovery of the M. hoffmanni holotype attracted little attention from mosasaur paleontologists. Second, the species was overshadowed by the more famous and history-rich type species.

The taxonomic validity of M. lemonnieri was long debated. In 1967, Russell argued that M. lemonnieri and M. conodon are the same species and designated the former as a junior synonym per the principle of priority. In his 2000 study, Lingham-Soliar refuted this based on a comprehensive study of Belgian M. lemonnieri specimens, which was corroborated by a study on the M. conodon skull by Takehito Ikejiri and Spencer G. Lucas in 2015. In 2004, Eric Mulder, Dirk Cornelissen, and Louis Verding suggested M. lemonnieri could be a juvenile form of M. hoffmanni based on the argument that significant differences could be explained by age-based variation. However, this was contested by subsequent work that highlighted major anatomical distinctions between the two species, primarily in the dentition. In a 2026 revision dedicated to the species, Henry S. Sharpe and colleagues reaffirmed the validity of the taxon by identifying several clear autapomorphies, particularly in the cranium.

M. beaugei was named in 1952 by Camille Arambourg as part of a large-scale research program on the phosphate deposits of Morocco that had been ongoing since 1934. The species was initially described from nine isolated teeth discovered in the phosphate basins of Oulad Abdoun and Ganntour, and was dedicated to Alfred Beaugé, then director-general of the OCP Group, who supported Arambourg's research. The holotype tooth has since been numbered as MNHN PMC 7. In 2004, Nathalie Bardet and colleagues reexamined Arambourg's original material and concluded that only three of these teeth could be confidently referred to M. beaugei, while also describing additional fossils of the species, including two relatively well-preserved skulls recovered from the Oulad Abdoun Basin.

=== Early depictions ===
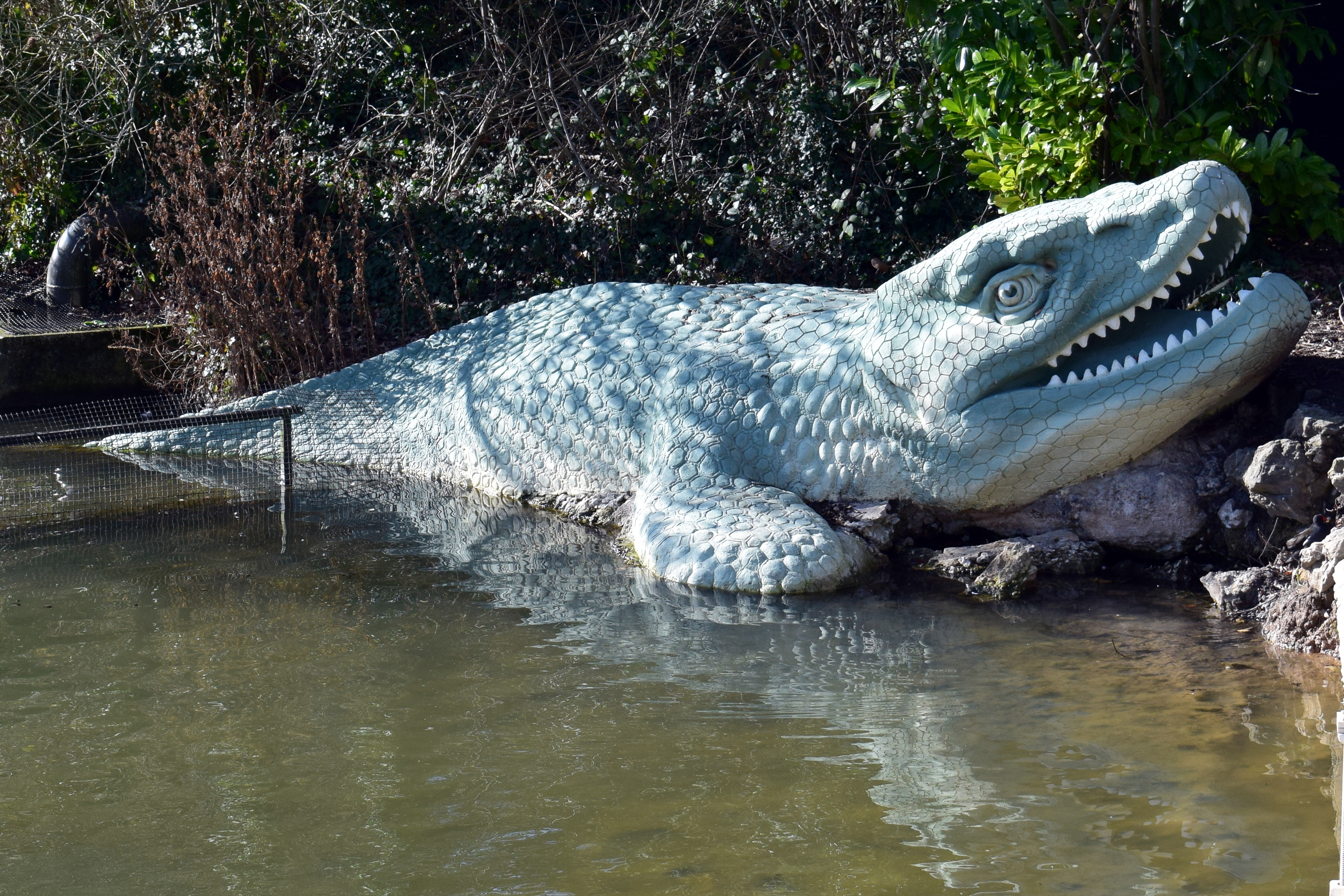
An 1854 depiction of Mosasaurus in Crystal Palace Park

Scientists during the early and mid-1800s initially imagined Mosasaurus as an amphibious marine reptile with webbed feet and limbs for walking. This was based on fossils like the M. missouriensis holotype, which indicated an elastic vertebral column that Goldfuss in 1845 saw as evidence of an ability to walk and interpretations of some phalanges as claws. In 1854, Hermann Schlegel proved how Mosasaurus actually had fully aquatic flippers. He clarified that earlier interpretations of claws were erroneous and demonstrated how the phalanges show no indication of muscle or tendon attachment, which would make walking impossible. They are also broad, flat, and form a paddle. Schlegel's hypothesis was largely ignored by contemporary scientists but became widely accepted by the 1870s when Othniel Charles Marsh and Cope uncovered more complete mosasaur remains in North America.

One of the earliest depictions of Mosasaurus in paleoart is a life-size concrete sculpture created by Benjamin Waterhouse Hawkins between 1852 and 1854 as part of the collection of sculptures of prehistoric animals on display at the Crystal Palace Park in London. The restoration was primarily informed by Richard Owen's interpretation of the M. hoffmanni holotype and the anatomy of monitor lizards, so Hawkins depicted the animal as essentially a water-going monitor lizard. It was given a boxy head, nostrils at the side of the skull, large volumes of soft tissue around the eyes, lips reminiscent of monitor lizards, scales consistent with those in large monitors like the Komodo dragon, and a flipper. The model was deliberately sculpted incomplete, which Mark Witton believed was likely to save time and money. Many elements of the sculpture can be considered inaccurate, even for the time. It did not take into account Golduss' 1845 study of M. missouriensis which instead called for a narrower skull, nostrils at the top of the skull, and amphibious terrestrial limbs (the latter being incorrect in modern standards).

== Description ==
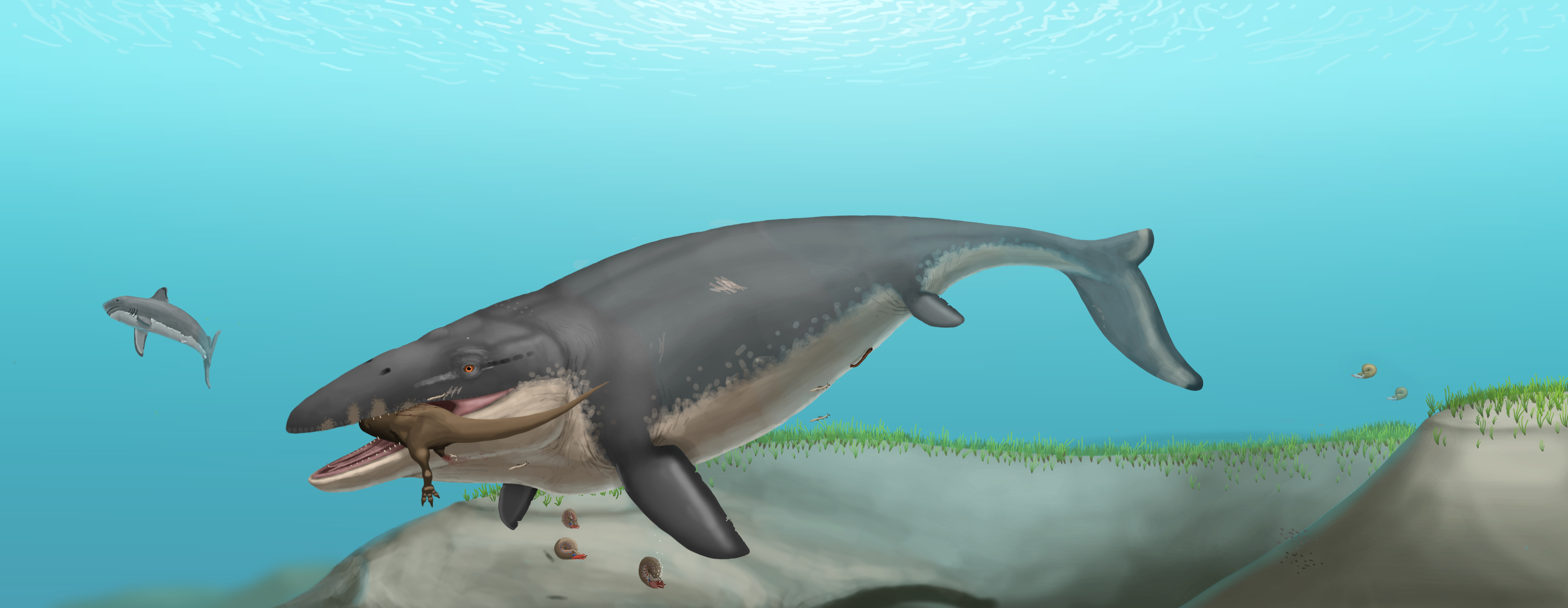
Life restoration of M. hoffmanni

Mosasaurus was a type of derived mosasaur, or a latecoming member with advanced evolutionary traits such as a fully aquatic lifestyle. As such, it had a streamlined body, an elongated tail ending with a downturn supporting a two-lobed fin, and two pairs of flippers. While in the past derived mosasaurs were depicted as akin to giant flippered sea snakes, it is now understood that they were more similar in build to other large marine vertebrates such as ichthyosaurs, marine crocodylomorphs, and archaeocete whales through convergent evolution.

=== Size ===
Size range of Mosasaurus compared with a human

The type species, M. hoffmanni, is one of the largest marine reptiles known, though knowledge of its skeleton remains incomplete as it is mainly known from skulls. Russell (1967) wrote that the length of the jaw equalled one tenth of the body length in the species. Based on this ratio, Grigoriev (2014) used the largest lower jaw attributed to M. hoffmanni (CCMGE 10/2469, also known as the Penza specimen; measuring 171 centimeters (67 in) in length) to estimate a maximum length of 17.1 meters (56 ft). Using a smaller partial jaw (NHMM 009002) measuring 90 centimeters (35 in) and "reliably estimated at" 160 centimeters (63 in) when complete, Lingham-Soliar (1995) estimated a larger maximum length of 17.6 meters (58 ft) via the same ratio. (Note: Lingham-Soliar may have misapplied the ratio. His calculations interpreted "body length" as the length of the postcranial body, not the total length of the animal as demonstrated in Russell (1967), This erroneously inflated the estimate by 10%.) No explicit justification for the 1:10 ratio was provided in Russell (1967), and it has been considered to be probably overestimated by Cleary et al. (2018). In 2014, Federico Fanti and colleagues alternatively argued that the total length of M. hoffmanni was more likely closer to seven times the length of the skull, which was based on a near-complete skeleton of the related species Prognathodon overtoni. The study estimated that an M. hoffmanni individual with a skull measuring more than 145 cm (57 in) would have been up to or more than 11 meters (36 ft) in length and weighed 10 metric tons (11 short tons) in body mass. Using the same ratio, Gayford et al. (2024) calculated the total length for the Penza specimen to be 12 meters (39 ft).

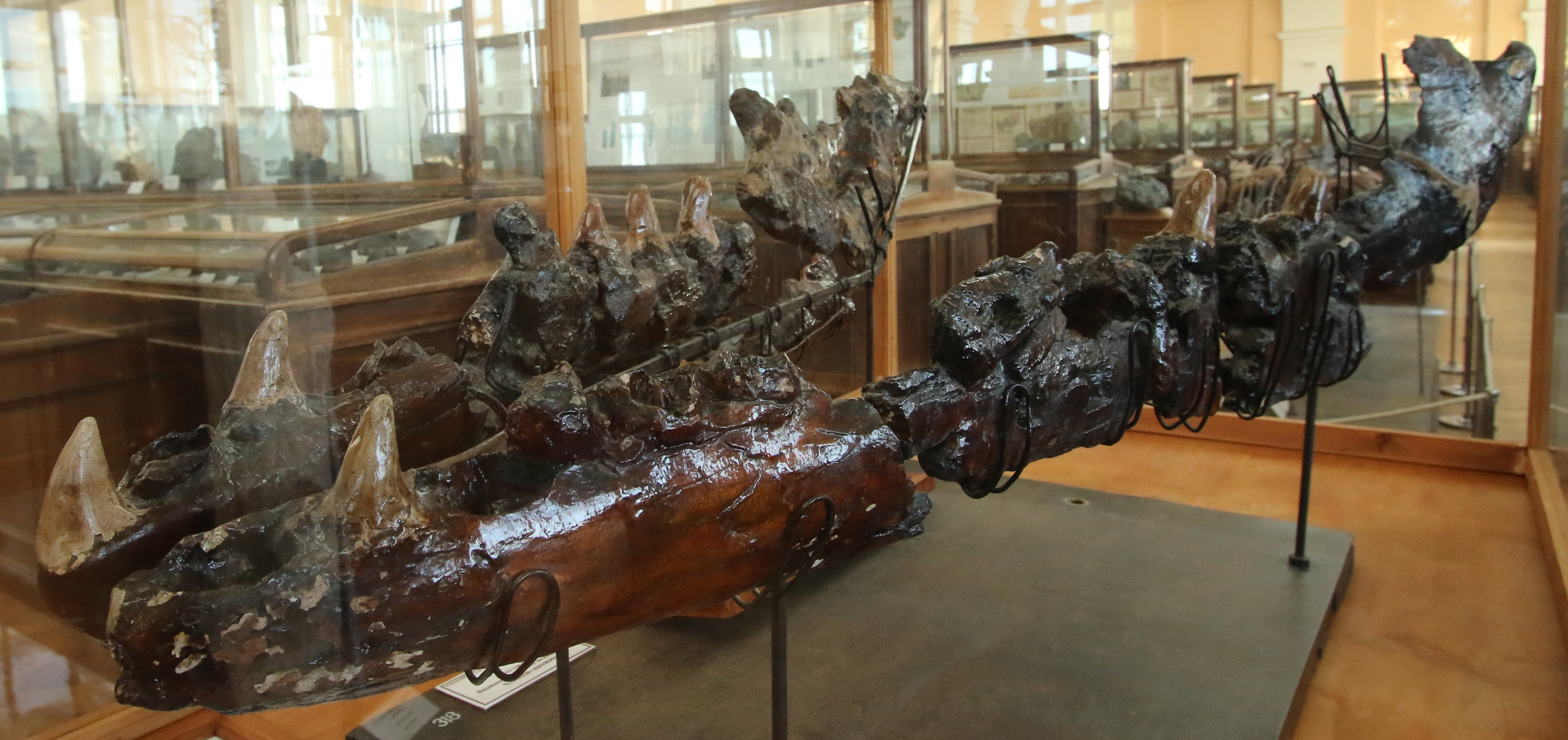
The Penza specimen, one of the largest known fossils of Mosasaurus

Isolated bones suggest some M. hoffmanni may have exceeded the lengths of the Penza specimen. One such bone is a quadrate (NHMM 003892) which is 150% larger than the average size, which Everhart and colleagues in 2016 reported can be extrapolated to scale an individual around 18 meters (59 ft) in length. It was not stated whether they applied Russell's 1967 ratio, although Gayford et al. (2024) suggested it was likely.

M. missouriensis and M. lemonnieri are smaller than M. hoffmanni but are known from more complete fossils. Based on measurements of various Belgian skeletons, Dollo estimated M. lemonnieri grew to around 7 to 10 meters (23 to 33 ft) in length. He also measured the dimensions of IRSNB R 29 and recorded that the skull constituted approximately one-eleventh of the whole body. Polcyn et al. (2014) estimated that M. missouriensis may have measured up to 8–9 meters (26–30 ft) in length. Street (2016) noted that large M. missouriensis individuals typically had skulls exceeding lengths of 1 meter (3.3 ft). A particular near-complete skeleton of M. missouriensis is reportedly measured at 6.5 meters (21 ft) in total length with a skull approaching 1 meter (3.3 ft) in length. Based on personal observations of various unpublished fossils from Morocco, Bardet et al. (2015) estimated that M. beaugei grew to a total length of 8–10 meters (26–33 ft), their skulls typically measuring around 1 meter (3.3 ft) in length. With a referred skull measuring 97.7 centimeters (38.5 in) in length, M. conodon has been regarded as a small to medium-sized representative of the genus.

=== Skull ===
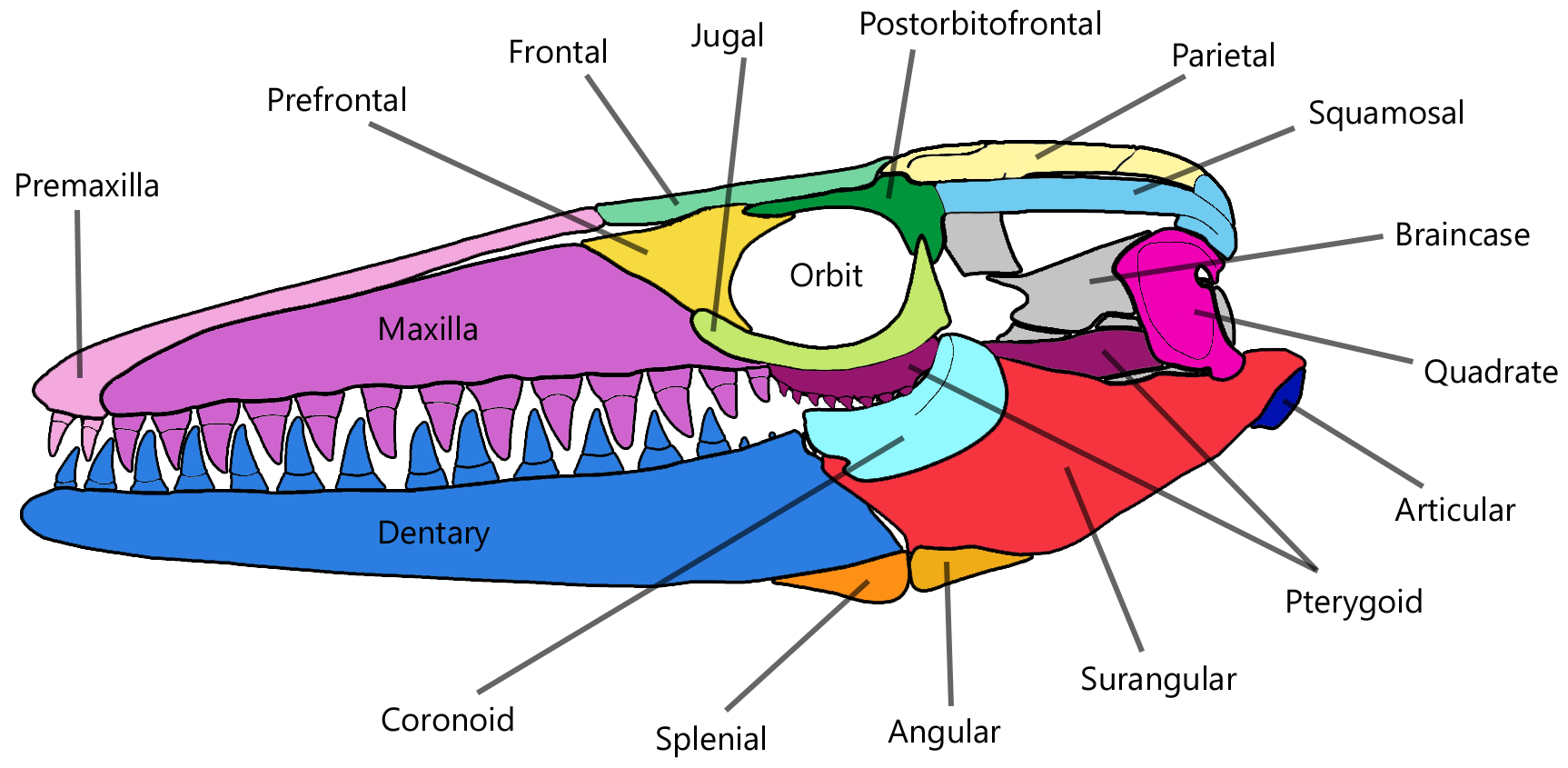
Annotated schematic of a M. hoffmanni skull

The skull of Mosasaurus is conical and tapers off to a short snout which extends a little beyond the frontmost teeth. In M. hoffmanni, this snout is blunt, while in M. lemonnieri it is pointed. Above the gum line in both jaws, a single row of small pits known as foramina are lined parallel to the jawline; they are used to hold the terminal branches of jaw nerves. The foramina along the snout form a pattern similar to the foramina in Clidastes skulls. The upper jaws in most species are robustly built, broad, and deep except in M. conodon, where they are slender. The disparity is also reflected in the dentary, the lower jawbone, although all species share a long and straight dentary. In M. hoffmanni, the top margin of the dentary is slightly curved upwards; this is also the case with the largest specimens of M. lemonnieri, although more typical skulls of the species have a near-perfectly straight jawline. The premaxillary bar, (Note: Also known as the internarial bar) the long portion of the premaxillary bone extending behind the premaxillary teeth, is narrow and constricts near the middle in M. hoffmanni and M. lemonnieri like in typical mosasaurs. In M. missouriensis, the bar is robust and does not constrict. The external nares (nostril openings) are moderately sized and measure around 21–24% of the skull's length in M. hoffmanni. They are placed further toward the back of the skull than in nearly all other mosasaurs (exceeded only by Goronyosaurus), and begin above the fourth or fifth maxillary teeth. As a result, the rear portions of the maxilla (the main tooth-bearing bone of the upper jaw) lack the dorsal concavity that would fit the nostrils in typical mosasaurs.

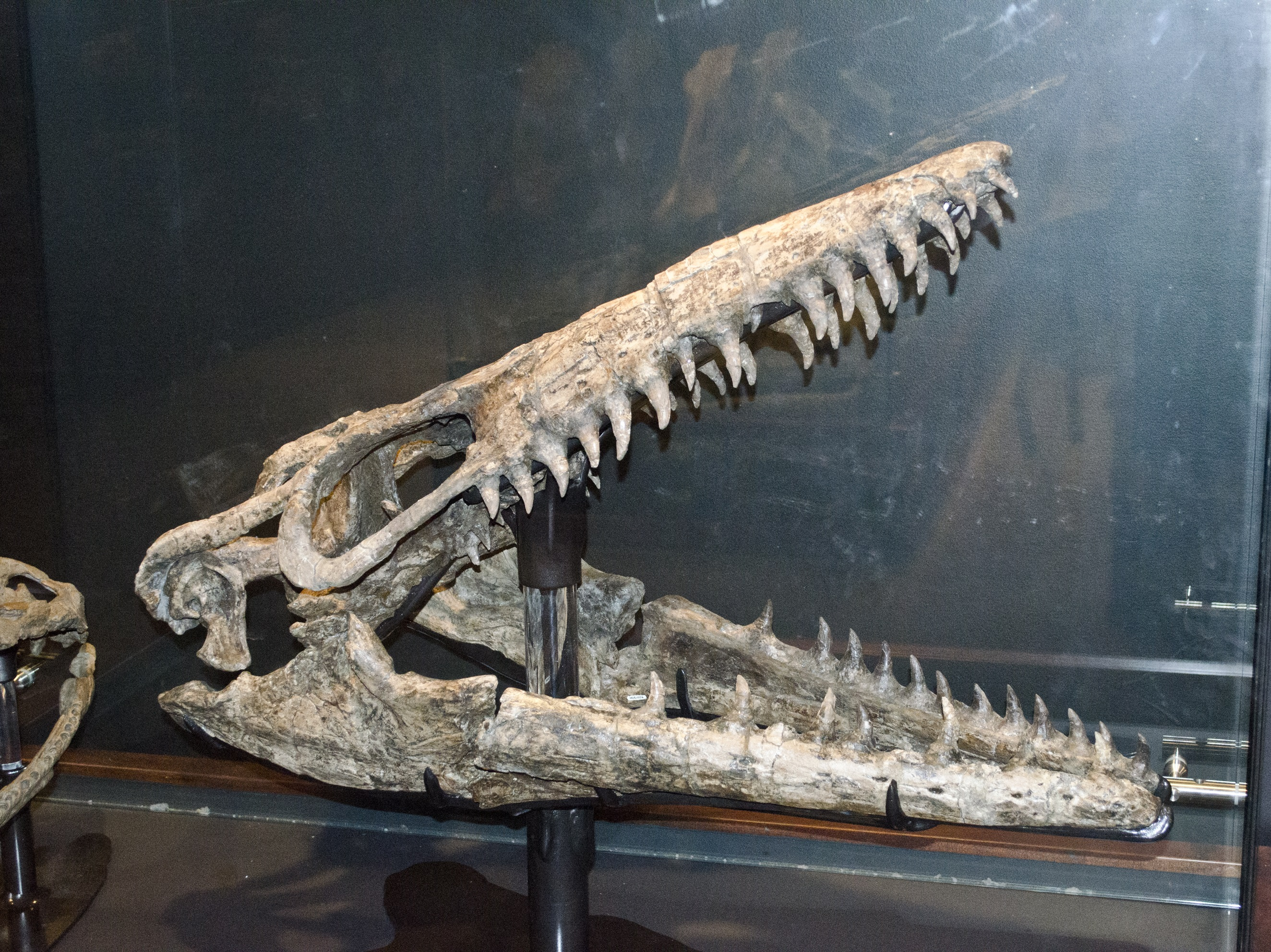
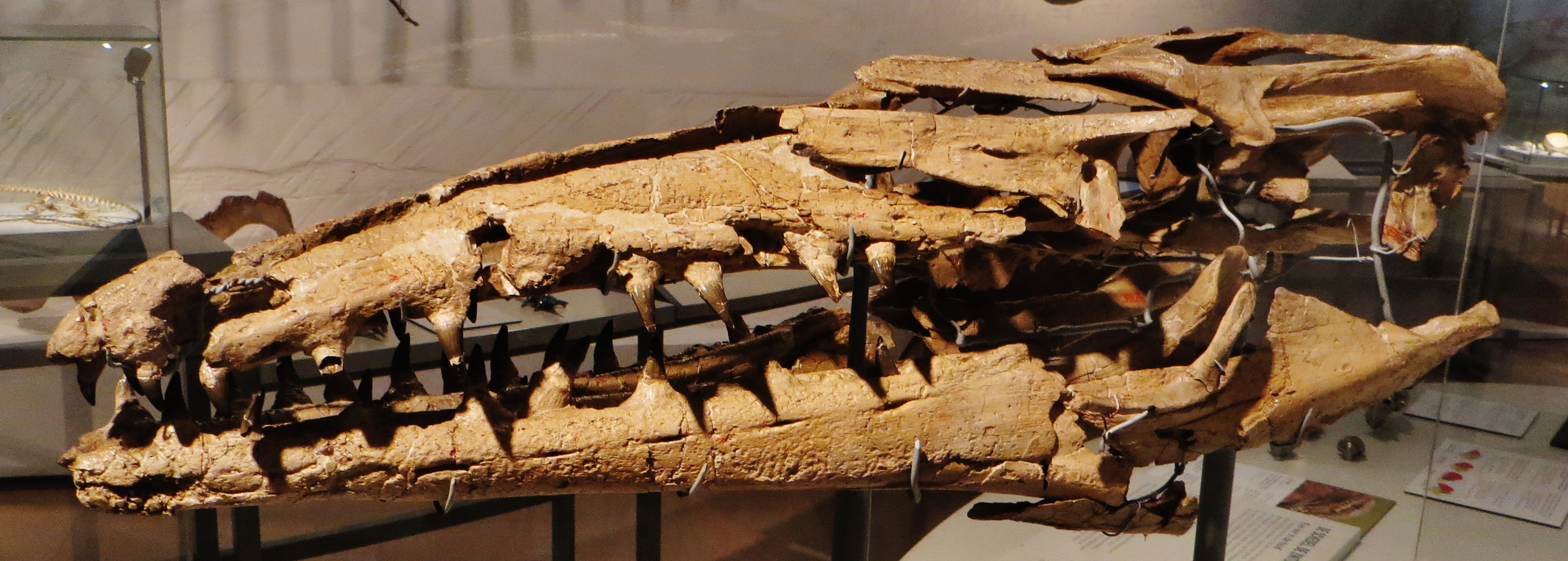
Fossil skulls of M. conodon (top) and of M. lemonnieri (bottom)

The palate, which consists of the pterygoid bones, palatine bone, and nearby processes of other bones, is tightly packed to provide greater cranial stability. The neurocranium housed a brain which was narrow and relatively small compared to other mosasaurs. For example, the braincase of the mosasaur Plioplatecarpus marshi provided for a brain around twice the size of that in M. hoffmanni despite being only half the length of the latter. Spaces within the braincase for the occipital lobe and cerebral hemisphere are narrow and shallow, suggesting such brain parts were relatively small. The parietal foramen in Mosasaurus, which is associated with the parietal eye, is the smallest among mosasaurids. The quadrate bone, which connected the lower jaw to the rest of the skull and formed the jaw joint, is tall and somewhat rectangular in shape, differing from the rounder quadrates found in typical mosasaurs. The quadrate also housed the hearing structures, with the eardrum residing within a round and concave depression in the outer surface called the tympanic ala. The trachea likely stretched from the esophagus to below the back end of the lower jaw's coronoid process, where it split into smaller pairs of bronchi which extended parallel to each other.

=== Teeth ===
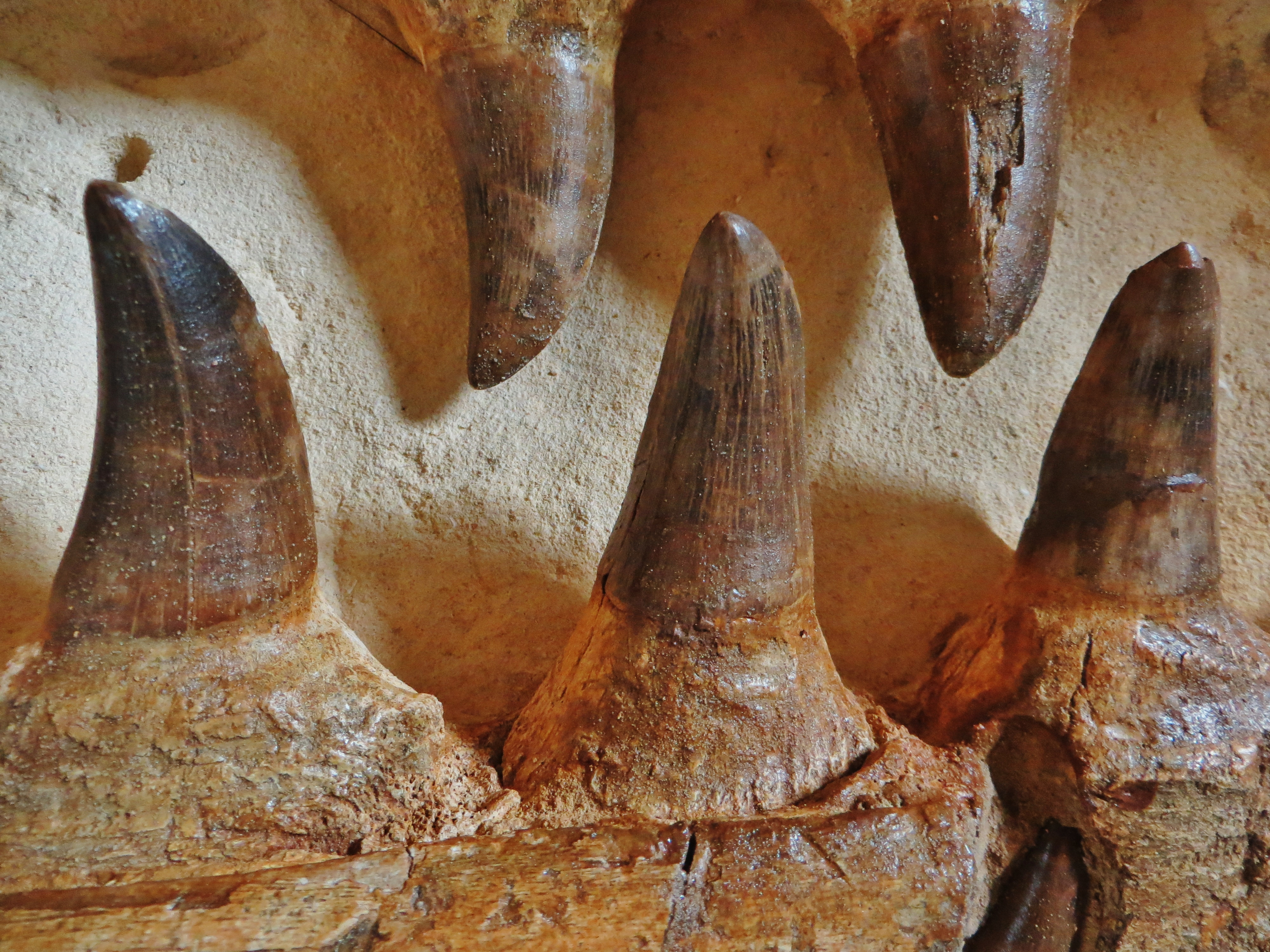
Closeup of M. hoffmanni teeth, with a replacement tooth developing inside the root of the lower right tooth

The features of teeth in Mosasaurus vary across species, but unifying characteristics include a design specialized for cutting prey, highly prismatic surfaces (enamel circumference shaped by flat sides called prisms), and two opposite cutting edges. Mosasaurus teeth are large and robust except for those in M. conodon and M. lemonnieri, which instead have more slender teeth. The cutting edges of Mosasaurus differ by species. The cutting edges in M. hoffmanni and M. missouriensis are finely serrated, while in M. conodon and M. lemonnieri serrations do not exist. (Note: One specimen traditionally attributed to M. lemonnieri has serration-like features in its cutting edges. Scientists believe this specimen likely belongs to a different species.) The cutting edges of M. beaugei are neither serrated nor smooth, but instead possess minute wrinkles known as crenulations. The number of prisms in Mosasaurus teeth can slightly vary between tooth types and general patterns differ between species (Note: The number of prisms in M. conodon and number of lingual prisms in M. lemonnieri are uncertain.)—M. hoffmanni had two to three prisms on the labial side (the side facing lips) and no prisms on the lingual side (the side facing the tongue), M. missouriensis had four to six labial prisms and eight lingual prisms, M. lemonnieri had eight to ten labial prisms, and M. beaugei had three to five labial prisms and eight to nine lingual prisms.

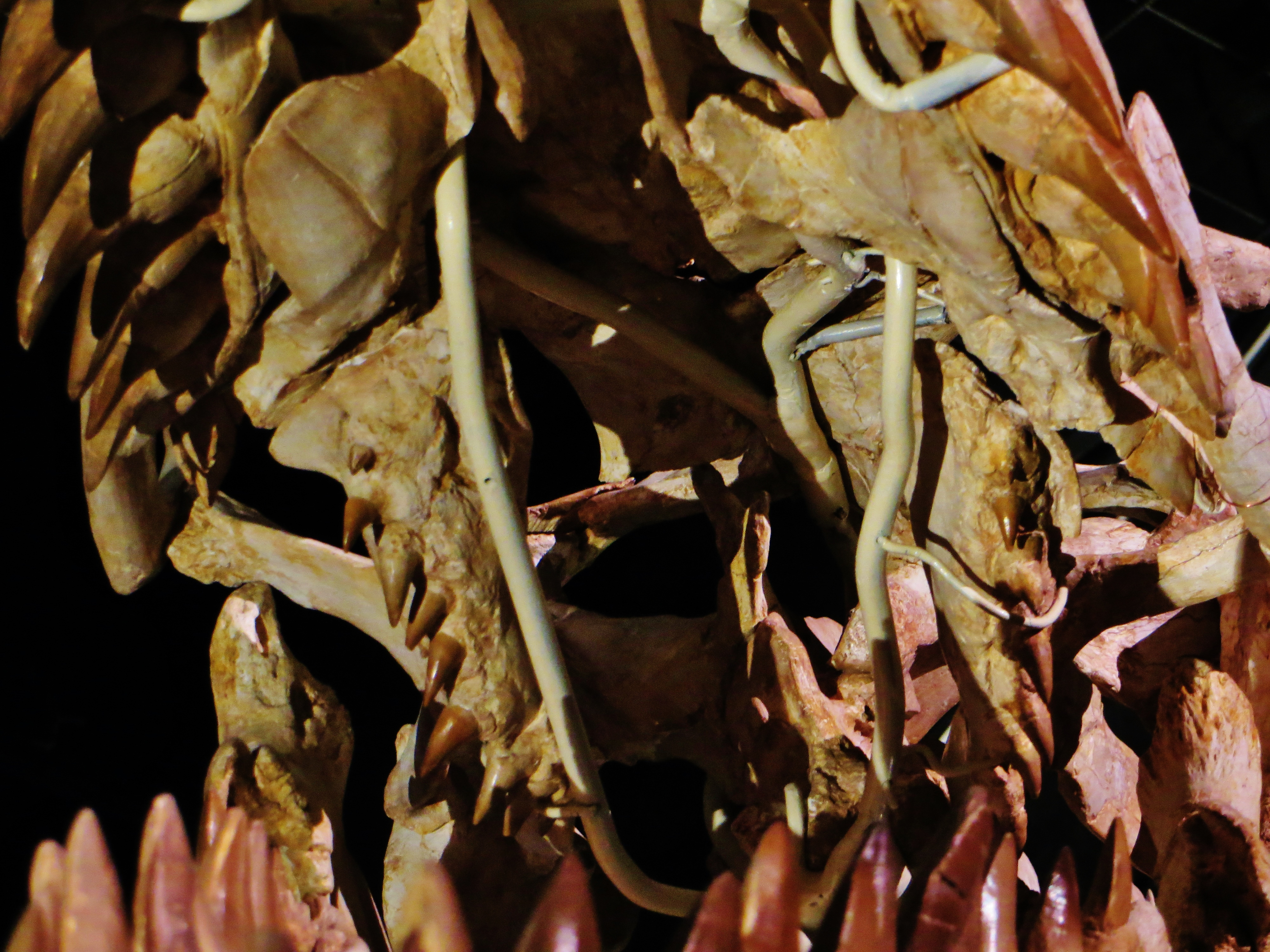
Closeup of a M. beaugei palate, showing the smaller pterygoid teeth on their namesake bones

Like all mosasaurs, Mosasaurus had four types of teeth, classified based on the jaw bones they were located on. On the upper jaw, there were three types: the premaxillary teeth, maxillary teeth, and pterygoid teeth. On the lower jaw, only one type, the dentary teeth, were present. In each jaw row, from front to back, Mosasaurus had: two premaxillary teeth, twelve to sixteen maxillary teeth, and eight to sixteen pterygoid teeth on the upper jaw and fourteen to seventeen dentary teeth on the lower jaw. The teeth were largely consistent in size and shape with only minor differences throughout the jaws (homodont) except for the smaller pterygoid teeth. The number of teeth in the maxillae, pterygoids, and dentaries vary between species and sometimes even individuals—M. hoffmanni had fourteen to sixteen maxillary teeth, fourteen to fifteen dentary teeth, and eight pterygoid teeth; M. missouriensis had fourteen to fifteen maxillary teeth, fourteen to fifteen dentary teeth, and eight to nine pterygoid teeth; M. conodon had fourteen to fifteen maxillary teeth, sixteen to seventeen dentary teeth, and eight pterygoid teeth; M. lemonnieri had fifteen maxillary teeth, fourteen to seventeen dentary teeth, and eleven to twelve pterygoid teeth; and M. beaugei had twelve to thirteen maxillary teeth, fourteen to sixteen dentary teeth, and six or more pterygoid teeth. One indeterminate specimen of Mosasaurus similar to M. conodon from the Pembina Gorge State Recreation Area in North Dakota was found to have an unusual count of sixteen pterygoid teeth, far greater than in known species.

The dentition was thecodont (tooth roots deeply cemented within the jaw bone). Teeth were constantly shed through a process where the replacement tooth developed within the root of the original tooth and then pushed it out of the jaw. Chemical studies conducted on a M. hoffmanni maxillary tooth measured an average rate of deposition of odontoblasts, the cells responsible for the formation of dentin, at 10.9 micrometers (0.00043 in) per day. This was by observing the von Ebner lines, incremental marks in dentin that form daily. It was approximated that it took the odontoblasts 511 days and dentin 233 days to develop to the extent observed in the tooth. (Note: This study was conducted on only one tooth and may not represent the exact durations of dentinogenesis in all Mosasaurus teeth.)

=== Postcranial skeleton ===
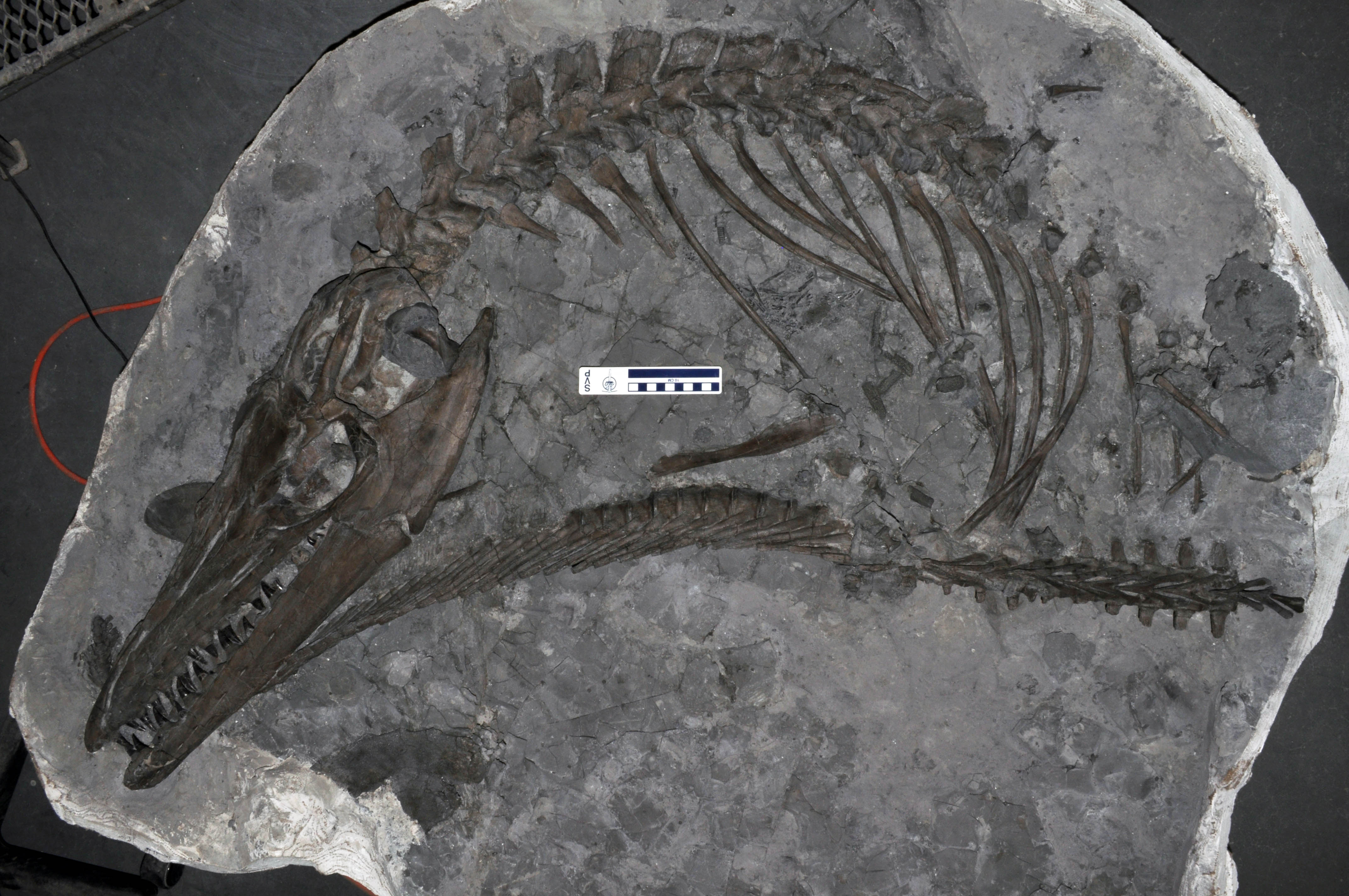
Well-preserved fossil of M. missouriensis

One of the most complete Mosasaurus skeletons in terms of vertebral representation (Mosasaurus sp.; SDSM 452) has seven cervical (neck) vertebrae, thirty-eight dorsal vertebrae (which includes thoracic and lumbar vertebrae) in the back, and eight pygal vertebrae (front tail vertebrae lacking haemal arches) followed by sixty-eight caudal vertebrae in the tail. All species of Mosasaurus have seven cervical vertebrae, but other vertebral counts vary among them. Various partial skeletons of M. conodon, M. hoffmanni, and M. missouriensis suggest M. conodon likely had up to thirty-six dorsal vertebrae and nine pygal vertebrae; M. hoffmanni had likely up to thirty-two dorsal vertebrae and ten pygal vertebrae; (Note: The number of caudal vertebrae is not fully certain for M. conodon and M. hoffmannii. At least ten have been documented in M. conodon, while the count is completely unknown in M. hoffmannii.) and M. missouriensis around thirty-three dorsal vertebrae, eleven pygal vertebrae, and at least seventy-nine caudal vertebrae. M. lemonnieri had the most vertebrae in the genus, with up to around forty dorsal vertebrae, twenty-two pygal vertebrae, and ninety caudal vertebrae. Compared to other mosasaurs, the rib cage of Mosasaurus is unusually deep and forms an almost perfect semicircle, giving it a barrel-shaped chest. Rather than being fused together, extensive cartilage likely connected the ribs with the sternum, which would have facilitated breathing movements and compression when in deeper waters. The texture of the bones is virtually identical with in modern whales, which indicates Mosasaurus possessed a high range of aquatic adaptation and neutral buoyancy as seen in cetaceans.

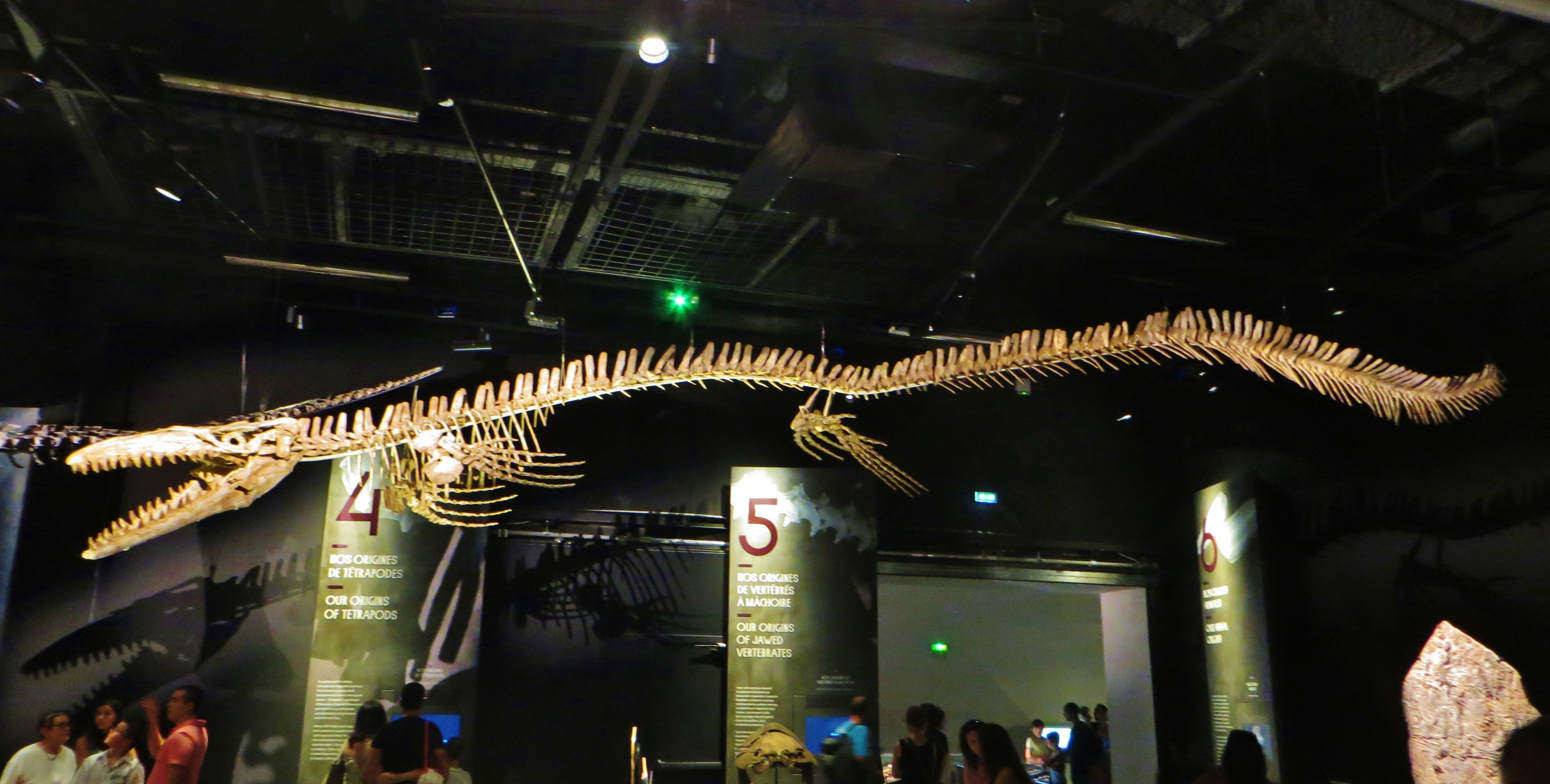
Skeletal reconstruction of M. beaugei, exhibited at the Musée des Confluences in Lyon, France

The tail structure of Mosasaurus is similar to relatives like Prognathodon, in which soft tissue evidence for a two-lobed tail is known. The tail vertebrae gradually shorten around the center of the tail and lengthen behind the center, suggesting rigidness around the tail center and excellent flexibility behind it. Like most advanced mosasaurs, the tail bends slightly downwards as it approached the center, but this bend is offset from the dorsal plane at a small degree. Mosasaurus also has large haemal arches located at the bottom of each caudal vertebra which bend near the middle of the tail, which contrasts with the reduction of haemal arches in other marine reptiles such as ichthyosaurs. These and other features support a large and powerful paddle-like fluke in Mosasaurus.

The forelimbs of Mosasaurus are wide and robust. The scapula and humerus are fan-shaped and wider than tall. The radius and ulna are short, but the former is taller and larger than the latter. The ilium is rod-like and slender; in M. missouriensis, it is around 1.5 times longer than the femur. The femur itself is about twice as long as it is wide and ends at the distal side in a pair of distinct articular facets (of which one connects to the ilium and the other to the paddle bones) that meet at an angle of approximately 120°. Five sets of metacarpals and phalanges (finger bones) were encased in and supported the paddles, with the fifth set being shorter and offset from the rest. The overall structure of the paddle is compressed, similar to in Plotosaurus, and was well-suited for faster swimming. In the hindlimbs, the paddle is supported by four sets of digits.

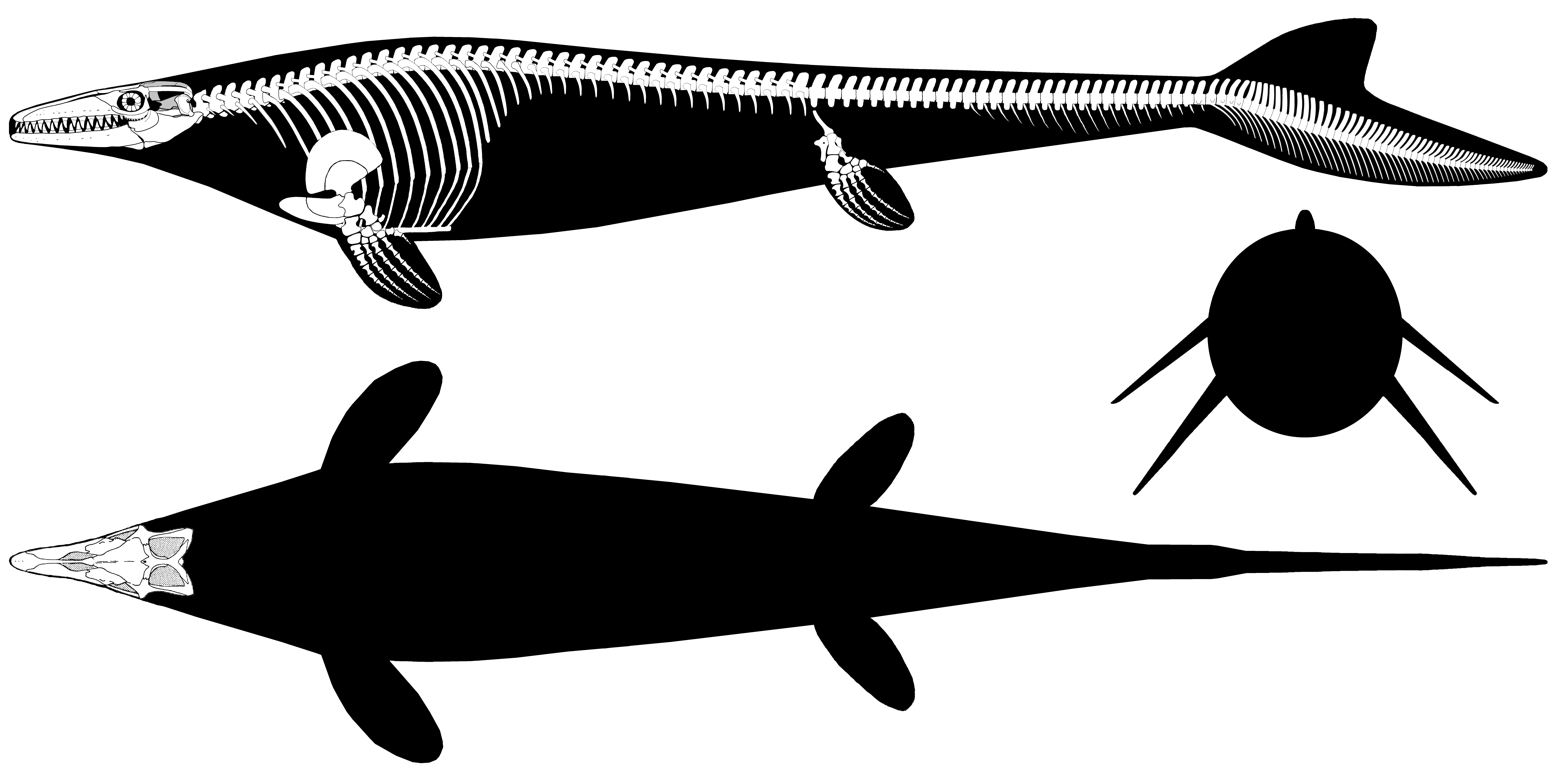

Interactive skeletal reconstruction of M. hoffmanni
(hover over or click on each skeletal component to identify the structure)

== Classification ==
=== History of taxonomy ===
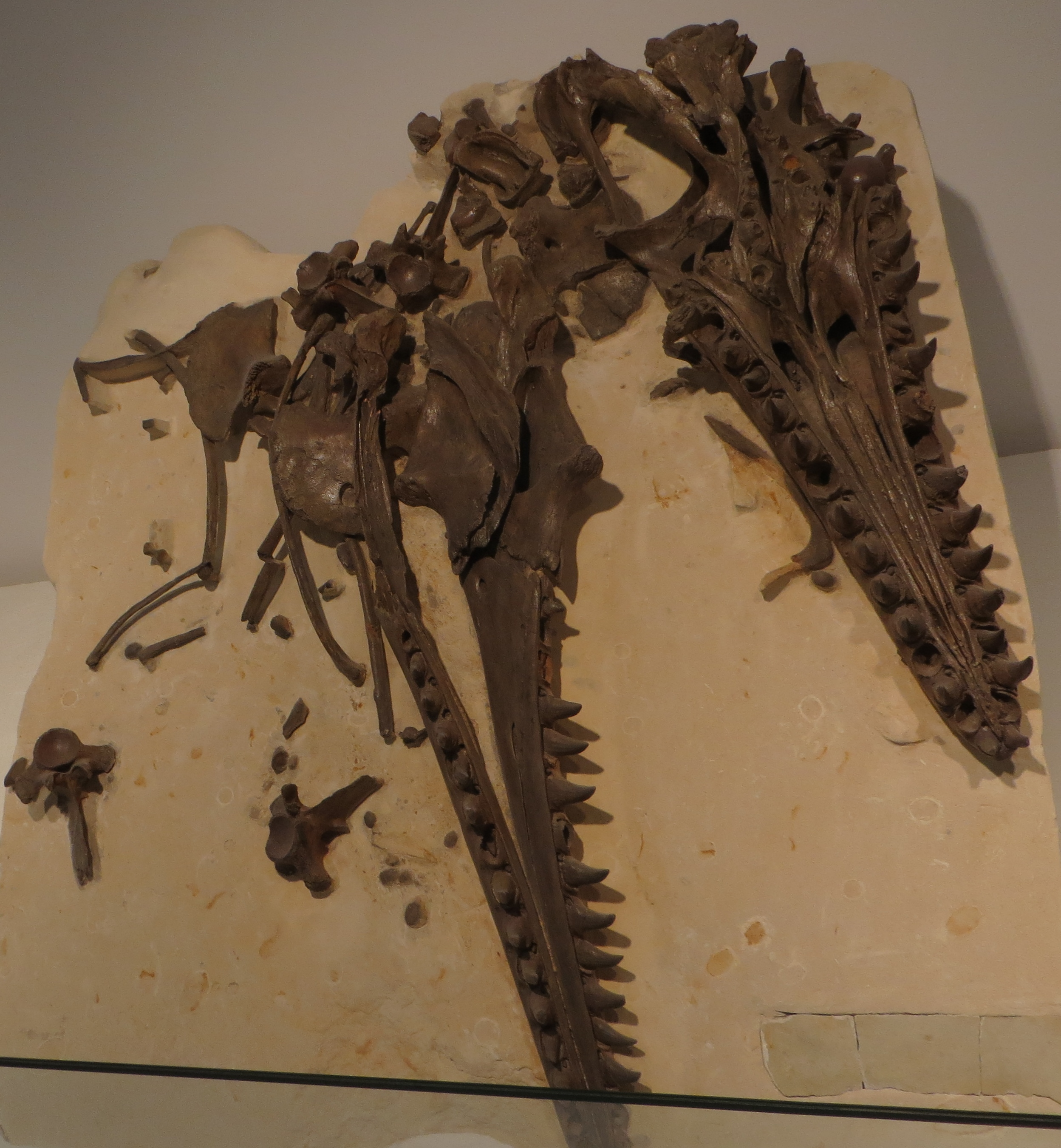
Fossil skull of the proposed new species 'M. glycys'

Because nomenclatural rules were not well-defined at the time, 19th century scientists did not give Mosasaurus a proper diagnosis during its initial descriptions, which led to ambiguity in how the genus is defined. This led Mosasaurus to become a wastebasket taxon containing as many as fifty different species. A 2017 study by Hallie Street and Michael Caldwell performed the first proper diagnosis and description of the M. hoffmanni holotype, which allowed a major taxonomic cleanup confirming five species as likely valid—M. hoffmanni, M. missouriensis, M. conodon, M. lemonnieri, and M. beaugei. The study also held four additional species from Pacific deposits—M. mokoroa, M. hobetsuensis, M. flemingi, and M. prismaticus—to be possibly valid, pending a future formal reassessment. (Note: Street & Caldwell (2017) also included M. dekayi as a potentially valid species without addressing in detail its dubious status.) Street & Caldwell (2017) was derived from Street's 2016 doctoral thesis, which contained a phylogenetic study proposing the constraining of Mosasaurus into four species—M. hoffmanni, M. missouriensis, M. lemonnieri, and a proposed new species 'M. glycys'—with M. conodon and the Pacific taxa recovered as belonging to different genera and M. beaugei view as a junior synonym (Note: Street & Caldwell (2017) revised this assessment of M. beaugei and found it to be a distinct species based on additional anatomical distinctions.) of M. hoffmanni. (Note: As the proposal remains restricted to a PhD thesis, it is defined as an unpublished work per Article 8 of the ICZN and therefore is not yet formally valid.) In their 2026 revision of M. lemonnieri, Sharpe and colleagues consider M. conodon as a nomen dubium, deeming its holotype too fragmentary to be diagnostic.

=== Systematics and evolution ===
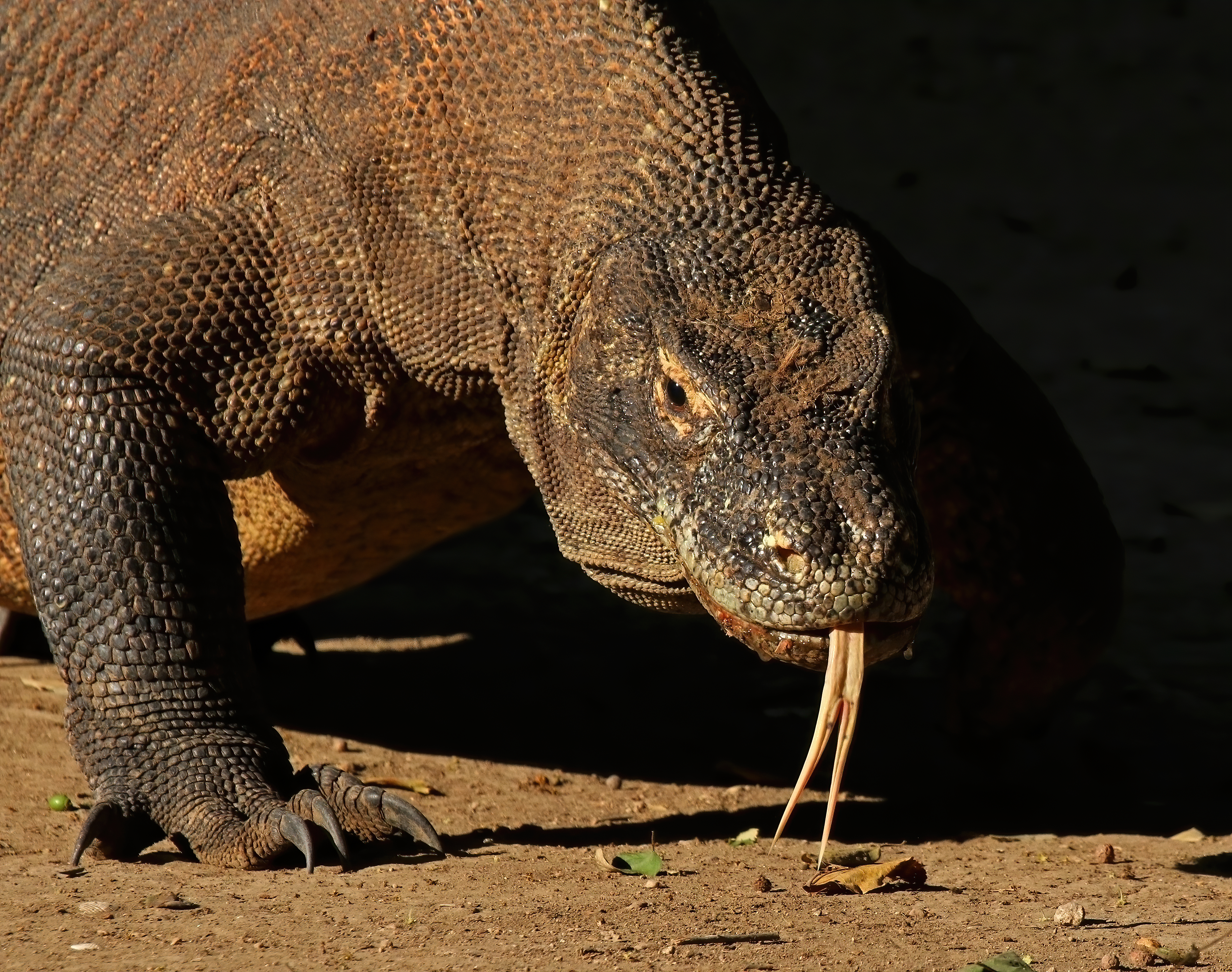
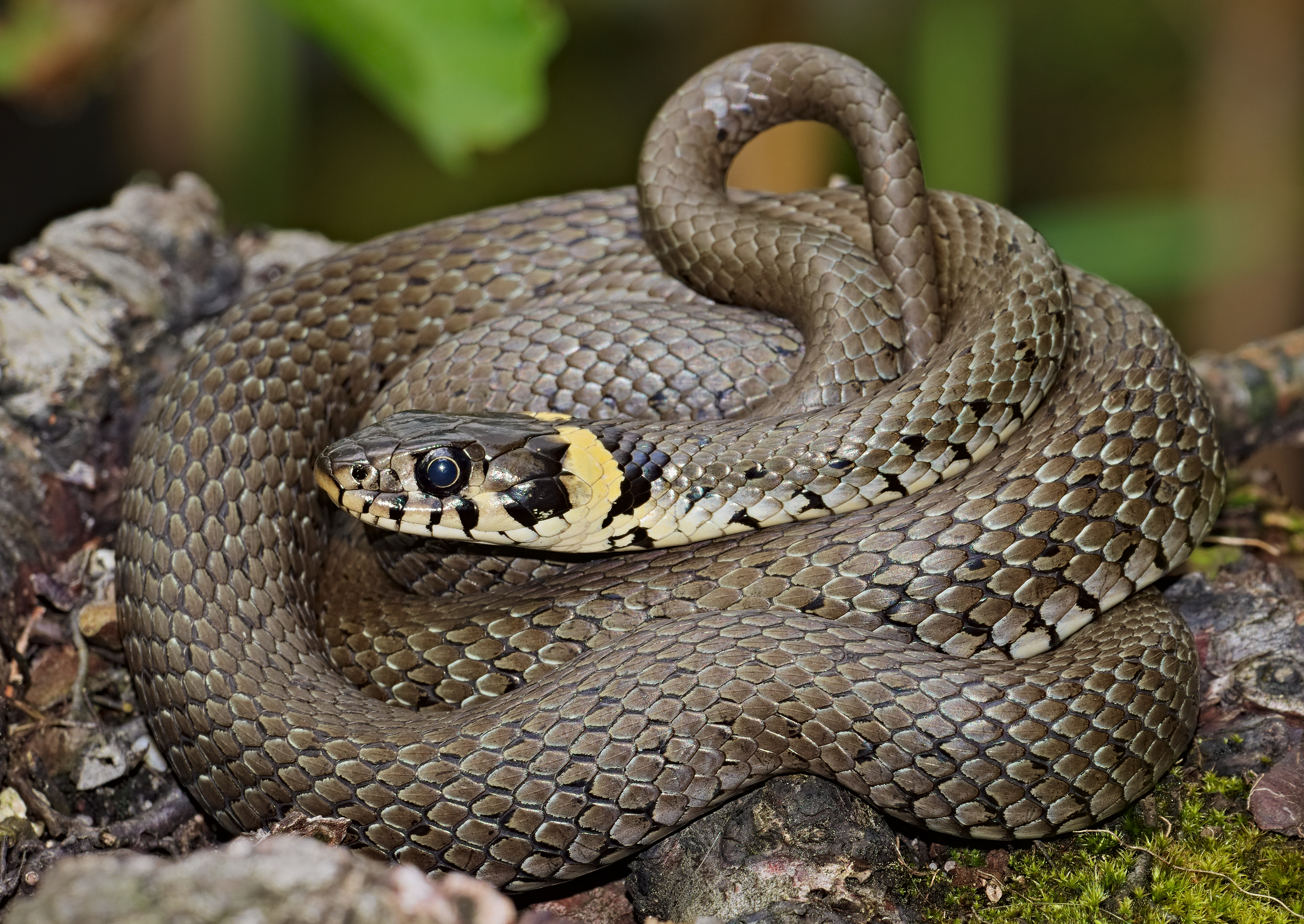
Mosasaurus is a squamate like monitor lizards and snakes, but scientists still debate which of the two is its closest living relative.

As the type genus of the family Mosasauridae and the subfamily Mosasaurinae, Mosasaurus is a member of the order Squamata (which comprises lizards and snakes). Relationships between mosasaurs and living squamates remain controversial as scientists still fiercely debate on whether the closest living relatives of mosasaurs are monitor lizards or snakes. Mosasaurus, along with mosasaur genera Eremiasaurus, Plotosaurus, and Moanasaurus (Note: Some studies such as Madzia & Cau (2017) also recover Prognathodon and Plesiotylosaurus within the Mosasaurini.) traditionally form a tribe within the Mosasaurinae variously called Mosasaurini or Plotosaurini.

==== Phylogeny and evolution of the genus ====
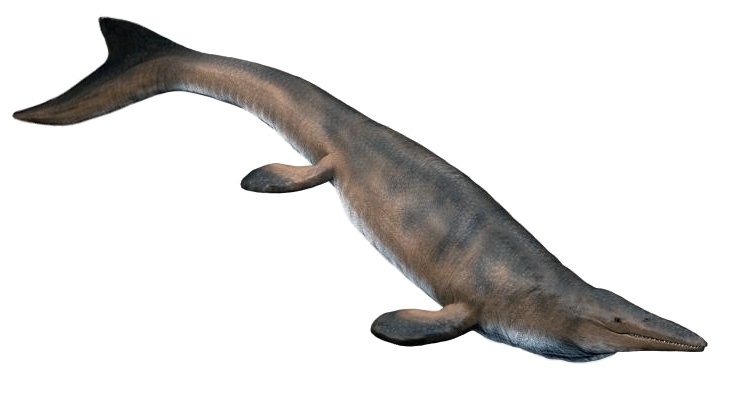
Life restoration of M. missouriensis

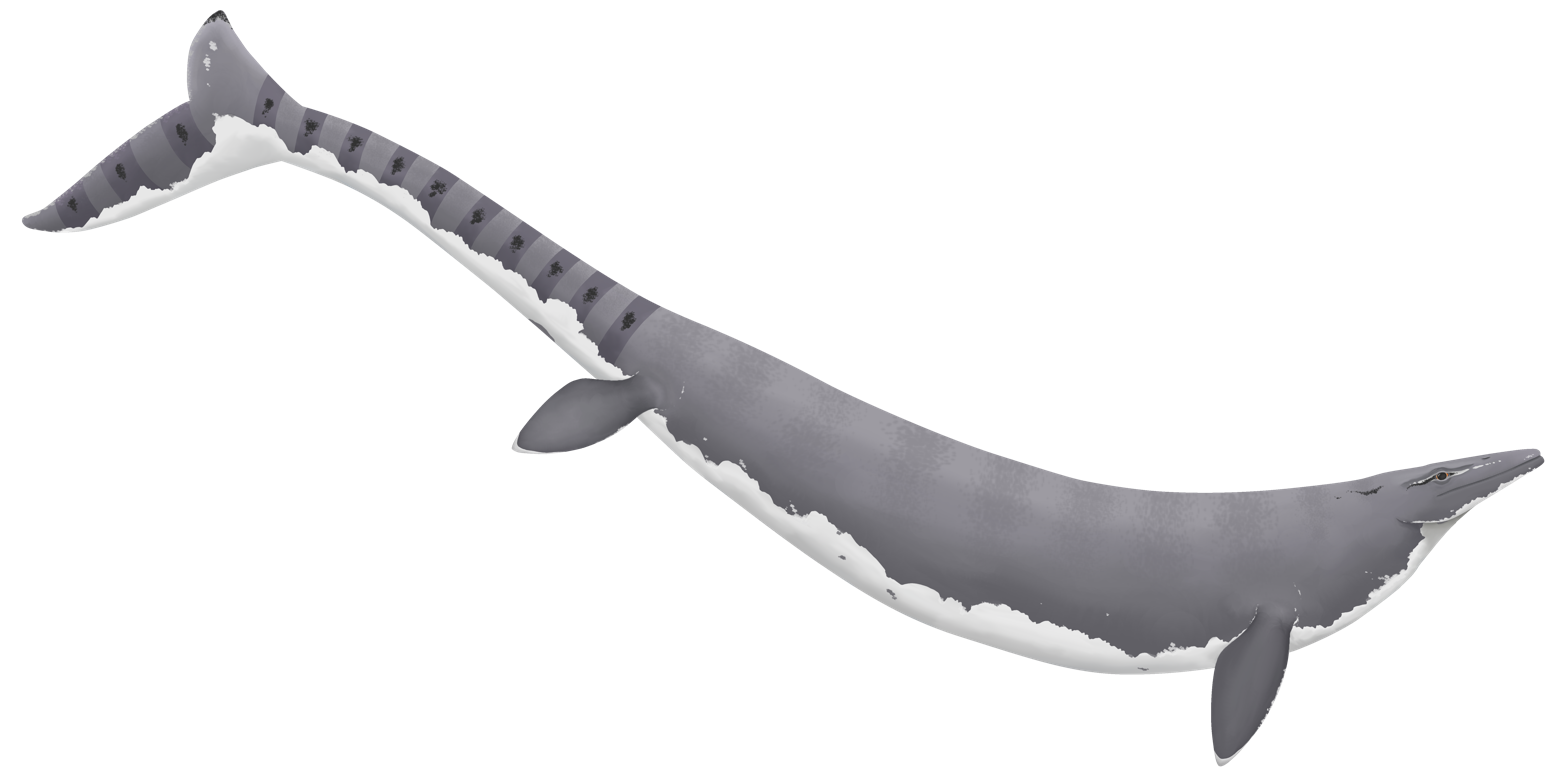
Life restoration of M. lemonnieri

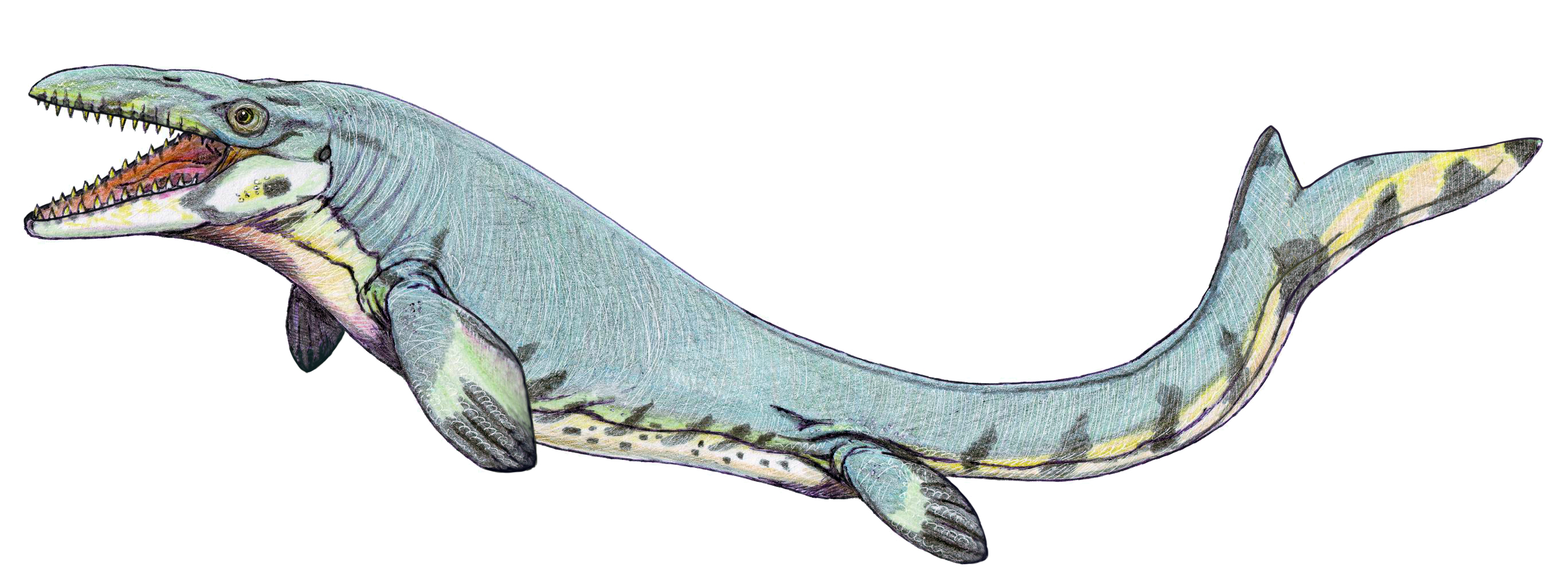
Restoration of M. beaugei

One of the earliest relevant attempts at an evolutionary study of Mosasaurus was done by Russell in 1967. He proposed that Mosasaurus evolved from a Clidastes-like mosasaur, and diverged into two lineages, one giving rise to M. conodon and another siring a chronospecies sequence which contained in order of succession M. ivoensis, M. missouriensis, and M. maximus-hoffmanni. (Note: M. maximus is a North American taxon Russell (1967) recognized as a distinct species. It is now generally recognized as a junior synonym of M. hoffmannii, although some scientists maintain the taxon is a distinct species.) (Note: maximus-hoffmannii was the wording used in Russell (1967); this is in recognition of the belief of a close relationship between the two species.) However, Russell used an early method of phylogenetics and did not use cladistics.

In 1997, Bell published the first cladistical study of North American mosasaurs. Incorporating the species M. missouriensis, M. conodon, M. maximus, and an indeterminate specimen (UNSM 77040), some of his findings agreed with Russell (1967), such as Mosasaurus descending from an ancestral group containing Clidastes and M. conodon being the most basal of the genus. Contrary to Russell (1967), Bell also recovered Mosasaurus in a sister relationship with another group which included Globidens and Prognathodon, and M. maximus as a sister species to Plotosaurus. The latter rendered Mosasaurus paraphyletic (an unnatural grouping), but Bell (1997) nevertheless recognized Plotosaurus as a distinct genus.

Bell's study served as a precedent for later studies that mostly left the systematics of Mosasaurus unchanged, although some later studies have recovered the sister group to Mosasaurus and Plotosaurus to instead be Eremiasaurus or Plesiotylosaurus depending on the method of data interpretation used, with at least one study also recovering M. missouriensis to be the most basal species of the genus instead of M. conodon. In 2014, Konishi and colleagues expressed a number of concerns with the reliance on Bell's study. First, the genus was severely underrepresented by incorporating only the three North American species M. hoffmanni/M. maximus, M. missouriensis, and M. conodon; by doing so, others like M. lemonnieri, which is one of the most completely known species in the genus, were neglected, which affected phylogenetic results. Second, the studies relied on an unclean and shaky taxonomy of the Mosasaurus genus due to the lack of a clear holotype diagnosis, which may have been behind the genus's paraphyletic status. Third, there was still a lack of comparative studies of the skeletal anatomy of large mosasaurines at the time. These problems were addressed in Street's 2016 thesis in an updated phylogenetic analysis.

Conrad uniquely used only M. hoffmanni and M. lemonnieri in his 2008 phylogenetic analysis, which recovered M. hoffmanni as basal to a multitude of descendant clades containing (in order of most to least basal) Globidens, M. lemonnieri, Goronyosaurus, and Plotosaurus. This result indicated that M. hoffmanni and M. lemonnieri are not in the same genus. However, the study used a method unorthodox to traditional phylogenetic studies on mosasaur species because its focus was on the relationships of entire squamate groups rather than mosasaur classification. As a result, some paleontologists caution that lower-order classification results from Conrad's 2008 study such as the specific placement of Mosasaurus may contain technical problems, making them inaccurate.

The following cladogram on the left (Topology A) is modified from a maximum clade credibility tree inferred by a Bayesian analysis in the most recent major phylogenetic analysis of the Mosasaurinae subfamily by Madzia & Cau (2017), which was self-described as a refinement of a larger study by Simões et al. (2017). The cladogram on the right (Topology B) is modified from Street's 2016 doctoral thesis proposing a revision to the Mosasaurinae, with proposed new taxa and renamings in single quotations.

Topology A:
Maximum clade credibility tree by Madzia & Cau (2017)

- - Dallasaurus turneri
  - - Clidastes liodontus
    - - Clidastes moorevillensis
      - - Clidastes propython
        - - Mosasaurini
            - - - - Prognathodon overtoni
                  - Prognathodon rapax
                - - - - Prognathodon saturator
                      - - Prognathodon currii
                        - Prognathodon solvayi
                  - - Prognathodon waiparaensis
                    - - Prognathodon kianda
                      - Eremiasaurus heterodontus
            - - Plesiotylosaurus crassidens
              - - Mosasaurus conodon
                - - Mosasaurus missouriensis
                  - - Mosasaurus hoffmannii
                    - Plotosaurus bennisoni
          - - Globidens alabamaensis
            - Globidens dakotensis

Positions of groups

Mosasaurus clade
Nominal Pacific species

Positions of individual taxa

Species traditionally referred as Mosasaurus conodon
Species traditionally referred as Plotosaurus bennisoni

Topology B:
Proposed revision by Street (2016)

- - Prognathodon solvayi
  - - Clidastes propython
    - - - Clidastes liodontus
        - Clidastes moorevillensis
      - - - Globidens alabamaensis
          - Globidens dakotensis
        - - Prognathodon kianda
          - - Eremiasaurus heterodontus
            - - - Prognathodon overtoni
                - - Prognathodon saturator
                  - - Prognathodon currii
                    - Prognathodon rapax
              - - Plesiotylosaurus crassidens
                - - 'Marichimaera waiparaensis'
                  - Mosasaurini
                    - - 'Amblyrhynchosaurus wiffeni'
                      - - 'Moanasaurus hobetsuensis'
                        - - Moanasaurus mangahouange
                          - 'Moanasaurus longirostris'
                    - - - Mosasaurus missouriensis
                        - - Mosasaurus lemonnieri
                          - - Mosasaurus hoffmannii
                            - 'Mosasaurus glycys'
                      - - 'Antipodenectes mokoroa'
                        - - 'Umikosaurus prismaticus'
                          - - 'Aktisaurus conodon'
                            - Plotosaurus bennisoni

== Paleobiology ==
=== Head musculature and mechanics ===
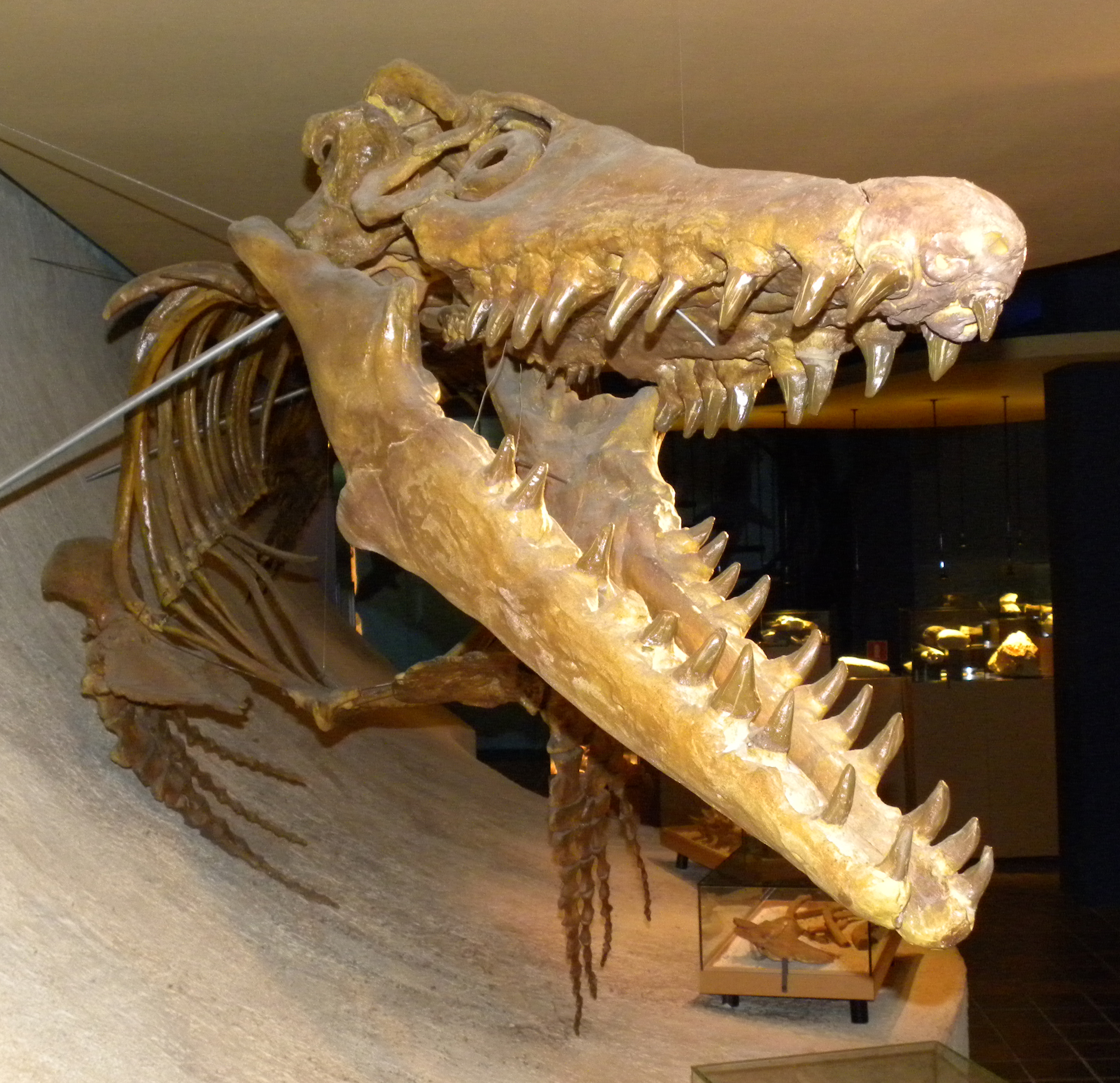
The skull of M. hoffmannii was adapted to withstand powerful bites.

In 1995, Lingham-Soliar studied the head musculature of M. hoffmanni. Because soft tissue like muscles do not easily fossilize, reconstruction of the musculature was largely based on the structure of the skull, muscle scarring on the skull, and the musculature in extant monitor lizards.

In modern lizards, the mechanical build of the skull is characterized by a four-pivot geometric structure in the cranium that allows flexible movement of the jaws, possibly to allow the animals to better position them and prevent prey escape when hunting. In contrast, the frontal and parietal bones, which in modern lizards connect to form a flexible pivot point, overlap in the skull of M. hoffmanni. This creates a rigid three-pivot geometric cranial structure. These cranial structures are united by strong interlocking sutures formed to resist compression and shear forces caused by a downward thrust of the lower jaw muscles or an upward thrust of prey. This rigid but highly shock-absorbent structure of the cranium likely allowed a powerful bite force.

Like all mosasaurs, the lower jaws of Mosasaurus could swing forward and backward. In many mosasaurs like Prognathodon and M. lemonnieri, this function mainly served to allow ratchet feeding, in which the pterygoid and jaws would "walk" captured prey into the mouth like a conveyor belt. But especially compared to those in M. lemonnieri, the pterygoid teeth in M. hoffmanni are relatively small, which indicates ratchet feeding was relatively unimportant to its hunting and feeding. Rather, M. hoffmanni likely employed inertial feeding (in which the animal thrusts its head and neck backward to release a held prey item and immediately thrust the head and neck forward to close the jaws around the item) and used jaw adduction to assist in biting during prey seizure. The magnus adductor muscles, which attach to the lower jaws to the cranium and have a major role in biting function, are massive, indicating M. hoffmanni was capable of enormous bite forces. The long, narrow, and heavy nature of the lower jaws and attachment of tendons at the coronoid process would have allowed quick opening and closing of the mouth with little energy input underwater, which also contributed to the powerful bite force of M. hoffmanni and suggests it would not have needed the strong magnus depressor muscles (jaw-opening muscles) seen in some plesiosaurs.

=== Mobility and thermoregulation ===
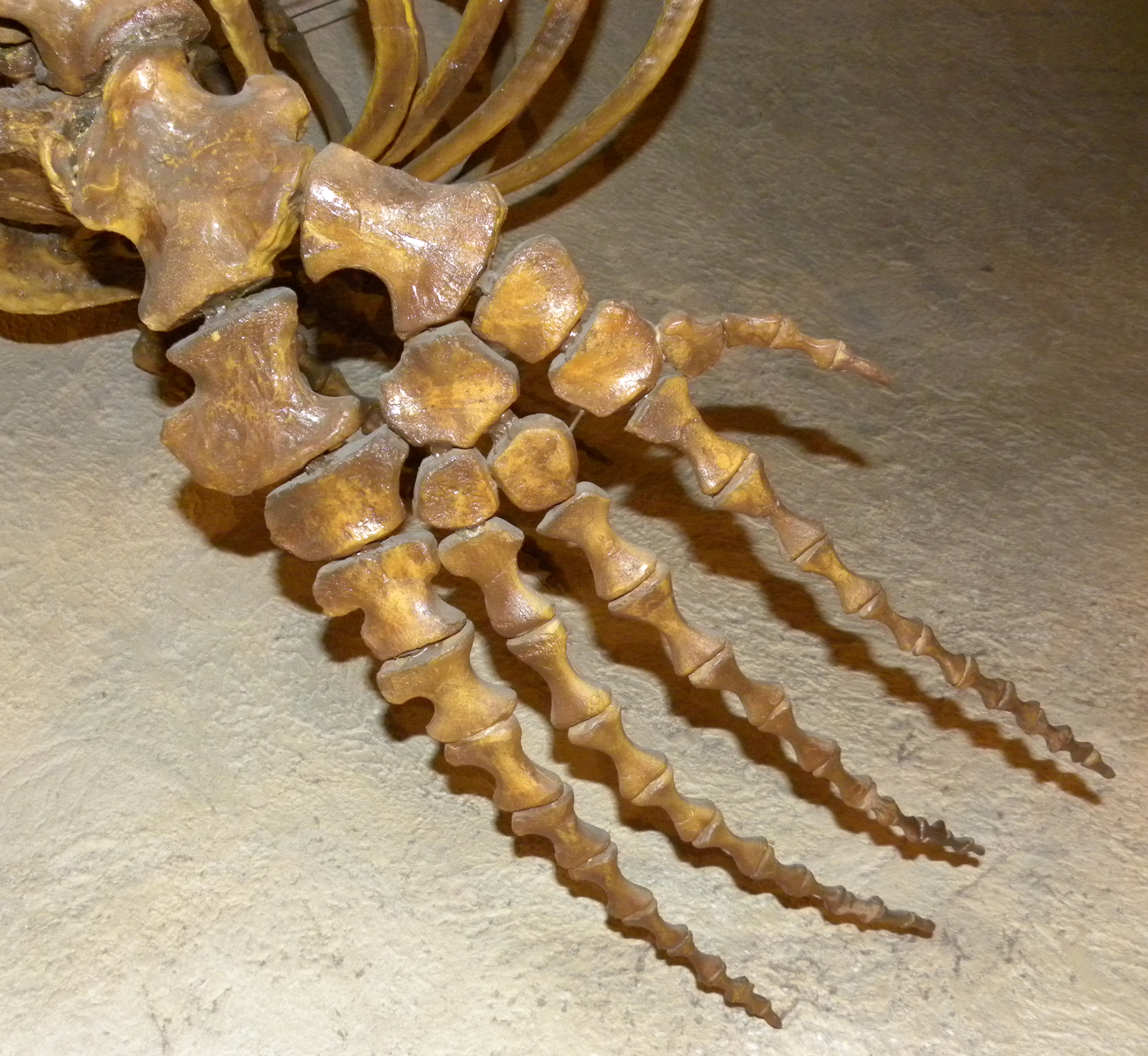
Reconstruction of an M. hoffmanni forelimb

Mosasaurus swam using its tail. The swimming style was likely sub-carangiform, which is exemplified today by mackerels. Its elongated paddle-like limbs functioned as hydrofoils for maneuvering the animal. The paddles' steering function was enabled by large muscle attachments from the outwards-facing side of the humerus to the radius and ulna and modified joints allowed an enhanced ability of rotating the flippers. The powerful forces resulting from use of the paddles may have sometimes resulted in bone damage, as evidenced by a M. hoffmanni ilium with significant separation of the bone's head from the rest of the bone likely caused by frequent shearing forces at the articulation joint.

The tissue structure of Mosasaurus' bones suggests it had a metabolic rate much higher than modern squamates and its resting metabolic rate was between that of the leatherback sea turtle and that of ichthyosaurs and plesiosaurs. Mosasaurus was likely endothermic and maintained a constant body temperature independent of the external environment. Although there is no direct evidence specific to the genus, studies on the biochemistry of related mosasaur genera such as Clidastes suggests that endothermy was likely present in all mosasaurs. (Note: The 2018 MS thesis of Cyrus Green disputes the notion that Clidastes was an endotherm based on the skeletochronology of the genus, finding its growth rates to be too low to be endothermic and instead similar to ectotherms. The dissertation argued that the high body temperatures calculated in pro-endotherm studies were a result of gigantothermy. However, only four specimens were studied.) Such a trait is unique among squamates, the only known exception being the Argentine black and white tegu, which can maintain partial endothermy. This adaptation would have given several advantages to Mosasaurus, including increased stamina when foraging across larger areas and pursuing prey. It may have also been a factor that allowed Mosasaurus to thrive in the colder climates of locations such as Antarctica.

=== Sensory functions ===
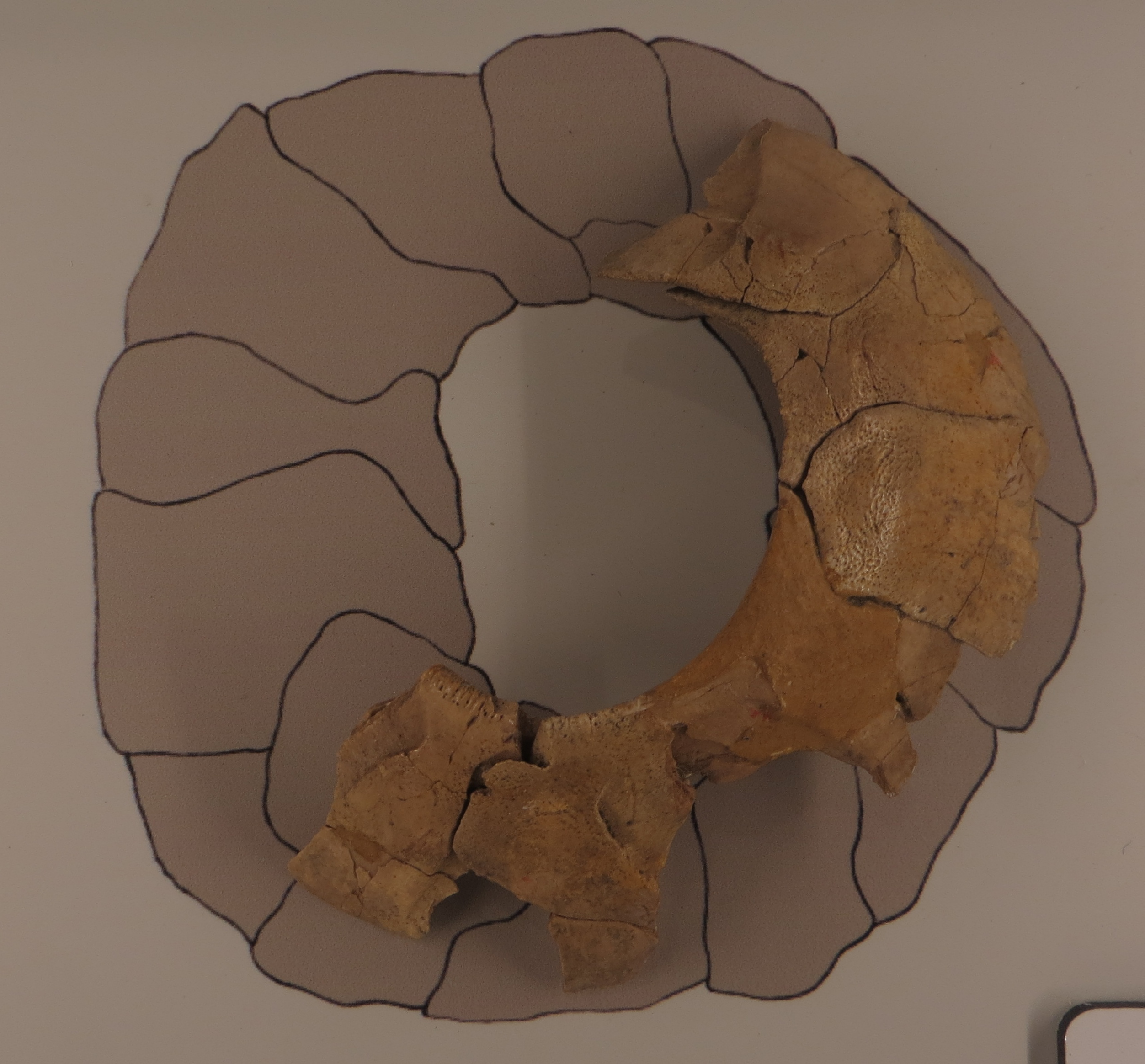
Scleral ring of Mosasaurus

Mosasaurus had relatively large eye sockets with large scleral rings occupying much of the sockets' diameter; the latter is correlated with eye size and suggests it had good vision. The eye sockets were located at the sides of the skull, which created a narrow field of binocular vision at around 28.5° but alternatively allowed excellent processing of a two-dimensional environment, such as the near-surface waters inhabited by Mosasaurus.

Brain casts made from fossils of Mosasaurus show that the olfactory bulb and vomeronasal organ, which both control the function of smell, are poorly developed and lack some structures in M. hoffmanni; this indicates the species had a poor sense of smell. In M. lemonnieri, these olfactory organs, although still small, are better developed and have some components lacking in M. hoffmanni. The lack of a strong sense of smell suggests that olfaction was not particularly important in Mosasaurus; instead, other senses like vision may have been more useful.

=== Feeding ===
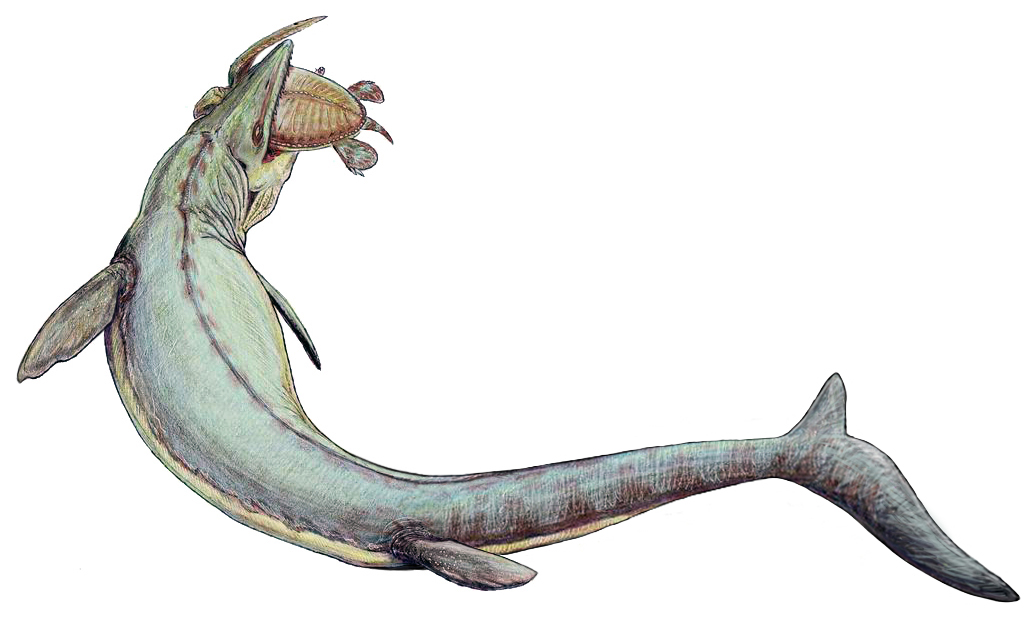
Restoration of M. hoffmanni preying on a sea turtle

Paleontologists generally agree that Mosasaurus was likely an active predator of a variety of marine animals. Fauna likely preyed upon by the genus include bony fish, sharks, cephalopods, birds, and marine reptiles such as other mosasaurs and turtles. It is unlikely Mosasaurus was a scavenger as it had a poor sense of smell. Mosasaurus was among the largest marine animals of its time, and with its large, robust cutting teeth, scientists believe larger members of the genus would have been able to handle virtually any animal. Lingham-Soliar (1995) suggested that Mosasaurus had a rather "savage" feeding behavior as demonstrated by large tooth marks on scutes of the giant sea turtle Allopleuron hoffmanni and fossils of re-healed fractured jaws in M. hoffmanni. The species likely hunted near the ocean surface as an ambush predator, using its large two-dimensionally adapted eyes to more effectively spot and capture prey. Recent 2024 research, however, used a model to calculate M. hoffmanni's acceleration capabilities. They concluded that ambush predation may not be the only hunting strategy for M. hoffmanni. Chemical and structural data in the fossils of M. lemonnieri and M. conodon suggests they may have also hunted in deeper waters.

Carbon isotope studies on fossils of multiple M. hoffmanni individuals have found extremely low values of δ^{13}C, the lowest in all mosasaurs for the largest individuals. Mosasaurs with lower δ^{13}C values tended to occupy higher trophic levels, and one factor for this was dietary: a diet of prey rich in lipids such as sea turtles and other large marine reptiles can lower δ^{13}C values. M. hoffmanni's low δ^{13}C levels reinforces its likely position as an apex predator. Dental microwear has likewise shown that M. hoffmanni had a generalist diet, which also appears to be the case with M. missouriensis.

Currently, there are only two known examples of a Mosasaurus preserved with stomach contents. The first is a well-preserved partial skeleton of a small M. missouriensis dated about 75 million years old with dismembered and punctured remains of a 1 meter (3.3 ft) long fish in its gut. This fish was much longer than the length of the mosasaur's skull, which measured 66 centimeters (26 in) in length, confirming that M. missouriensis consumed prey larger than its head by dismembering and consuming bits at a time. Due to coexistence with other large mosasaurs like Prognathodon, which specialized in robust prey, M. missouriensis likely specialized more on prey best consumed using cutting-adapted teeth in an example of niche partitioning. The second is from a subadult M. hoffmanni partial skeleton recovered from the same locality as the species' holotype near Maastricht, nicknamed "Lars". This specimen was reported in a 2024 conference to contain acid-corroded bones of a juvenile turtle reminiscent of Ctenochelys and of other distinct but unidentified animals in the gut region. Bones of an indeterminate bird or bird-like dinosaur were also found in association with the mosasaur, which could have also represented gut contents.

Mosasaurus may have taught their offspring how to hunt, as supported by a fossil nautiloid Argonautilus catarinae with bite marks from two conspecific mosasaurs, one being from a juvenile and the other being from an adult. Analysis of the tooth marks by a 2004 study by Kauffman concluded that the mosasaurs were either Mosasaurus or Platecarpus. The positioning of both bite marks are at the direction the nautiloid's head would have been facing, indicating it was incapable of escaping and was thus already sick or dead during the attacks; it is possible this phenomenon was from a parent mosasaur teaching its offspring about cephalopods as an alternate source of prey and how to hunt one. An alternate explanation postulates the bite marks as from one individual mosasaur that lightly bit the nautiloid at first, then proceeded to bite again with greater force. However, there are differences in tooth spacing between both bites which indicate different jaw sizes.

=== Behavior and paleopathology ===
==== Intraspecific combat ====
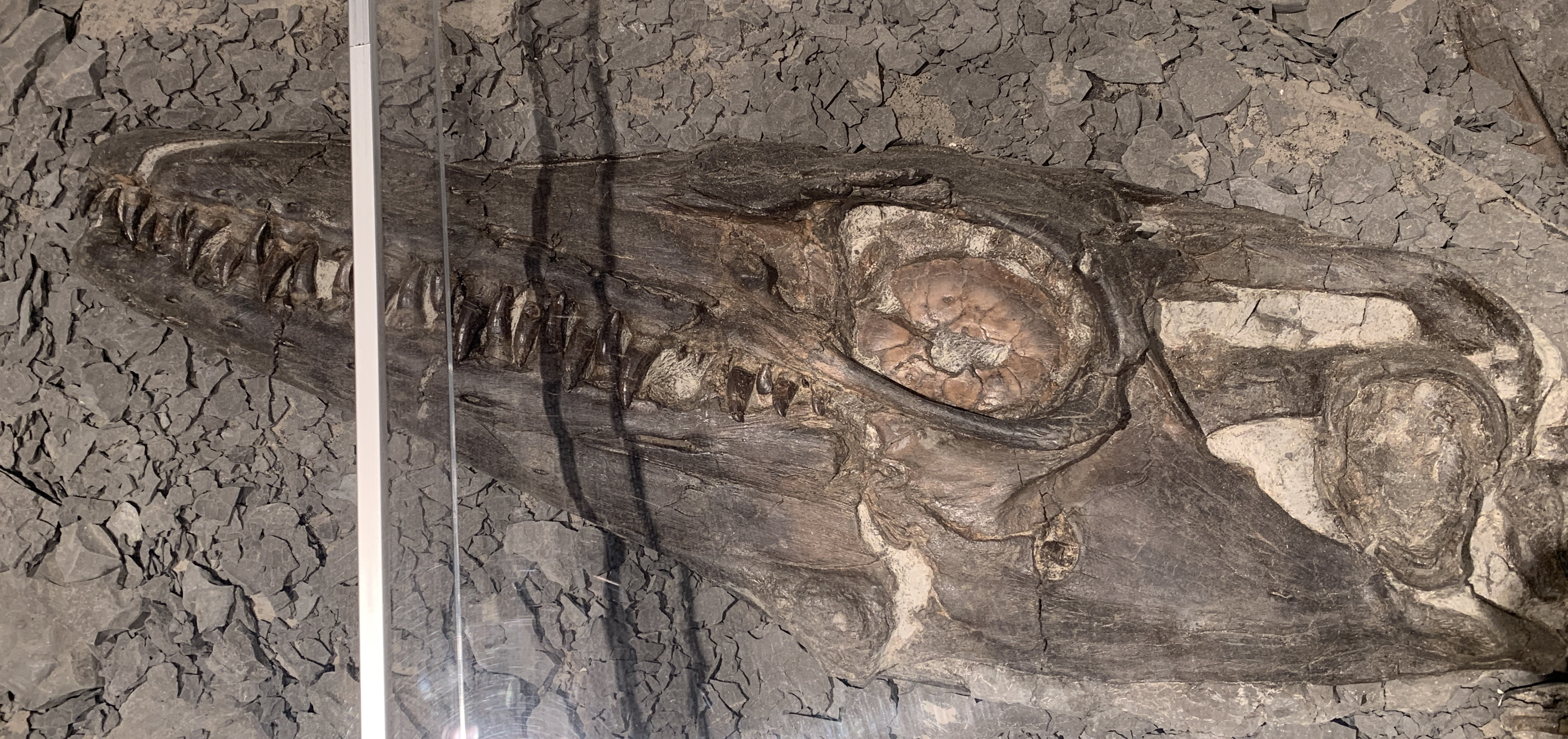
M. missouriensis skull with another individual's tooth embedded in the rear lower jaw, likely via head grappling

There is fossil evidence that Mosasaurus engaged in aggressive and lethal combat with others of its kind. One partial skeleton of M. conodon bears multiple cuts, breaks, and punctures on various bones, particularly in the rear portions of the skull and neck, and a tooth from another M. conodon piercing through the quadrate bone. No injuries on the fossil show signs of healing, suggesting that the mosasaur was killed by its attacker by a fatal blow in the skull. Likewise, an M. missouriensis skeleton has a tooth from another M. missouriensis embedded in the lower jaw underneath the eye. In this case, there were signs of healing around the wound, implying survival of the incident. Takuya Konishi suggested an alternative cause of this example being head-biting behavior during courtship as seen in modern lizards. Attacks by another Mosasaurus are a possible cause of physical pathologies in other skulls, but they could have instead arisen from other incidents like attempted biting on hard turtle shells. In 2004, Lingham-Soliar observed that if these injuries were indeed the result of an intraspecific attack, then there is a pattern of them concentrating in the skull region. Modern crocodiles commonly attack each other by grappling an opponent's head using their jaws, and Lingham-Soliar hypothesized that Mosasaurus employed similar head-grappling behavior during intraspecific combat. Many of the fossils with injuries possibly attributable to intraspecific combat are of juvenile or sub-adult Mosasaurus, leading to the possibility that attacks on smaller, weaker individuals may have been more common. However, the attacking mosasaurs of the M. conodon and M. missouriensis specimens were likely similar in size to the victims. In 2006, Schulp and colleagues speculated that Mosasaurus may have occasionally engaged in cannibalism as a result of intraspecific aggression.

==== Diseases ====
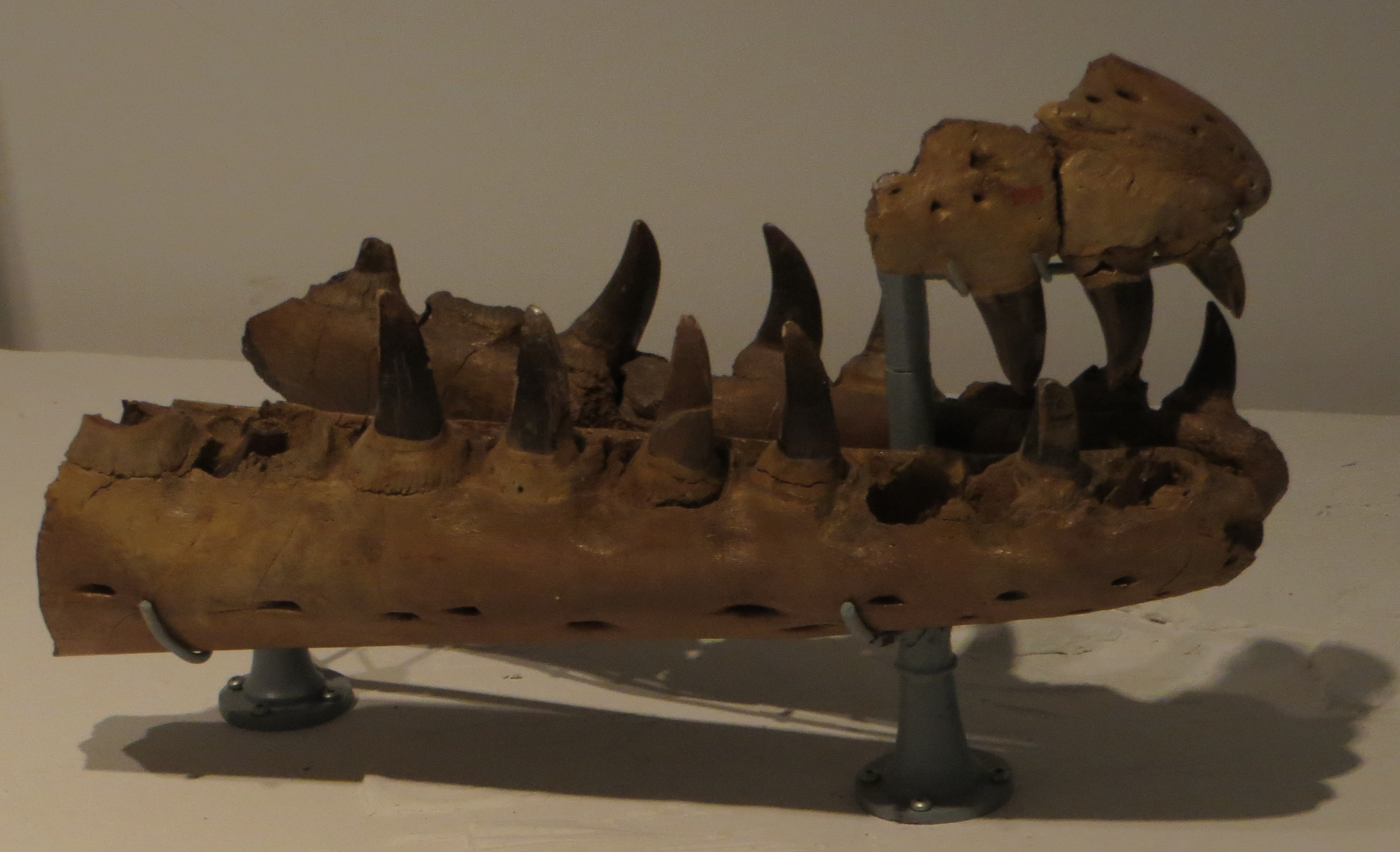
M. hoffmanni specimen IRSNB R25, with an infected fracture to the left dentary (seen between the two middle tooth crowns in the back)

There are some M. hoffmanni jaws with evidence of infectious diseases as a result of physical injuries. Two examples include IRSNB R25 and IRSNB R27, both having fractures and other pathologies in their dentaries. IRSNB R25 preserves a complete fracture near the sixth tooth socket. Extensive amounts of bony callus almost overgrowing the tooth socket are present around the fracture along with various osteolytic cavities, abscess canals, damages to the trigeminal nerve, and inflamed erosions signifying severe bacterial infection. There are two finely ulcerated scratches on the bone callus, which may have developed as part of the healing process. IRSNB R27 has two fractures: one had almost fully healed and the other is an open fracture with nearby teeth broken off as a result. The fracture is covered with a nonunion formation of bony callus with shallow scratch marks and a large pit connected to an abscess canal. Lingham-Soliar described this pit as resembling a tooth mark from a possible attacking mosasaur. Both specimens show signs of deep bacterial infection alongside the fractures; some bacteria may have spread to nearby damaged teeth and caused tooth decay, which may have entered deeper tissue from prior post-traumatic or secondary infections. The dentaries ahead of the fractures in both specimens are in good condition, suggesting that the arteries and trigeminal nerves had not been damaged; if they were, those areas would have necrotized due to lack of blood. The dentaries' condition suggests that the species may have had an efficient process of immobilizing the fracture during healing, which helped prevent damage to vital blood vessels and nerves. This, along with signs of healing, indicates that the fractures were not imminently fatal.

In 2006, Schulp and colleagues published a study describing a quadrate of M. hoffmanni with multiple unnatural openings and an estimated 0.5 liters (0.13 U.S. gal) of tissue destroyed. This was likely a severe bone infection initiated by septic arthritis, which progressed to the point where a large portion of the quadrate was reduced to abscess. Extensive amounts of bone reparative tissue were also present, suggesting the infection and subsequent healing process may have progressed for a few months. This level of bone infection would have been tremendously painful and severely hampered the mosasaur's ability to use its jaws. The location of the infection may have also interfered with breathing. Considering how the individual was able to survive such conditions for an extended period of time, Schulp and colleagues speculated it switched to a foraging-type diet of soft-bodied prey like squid that could be swallowed whole to minimize jaw use. The cause of the infection remains unknown, but if it were a result of an intraspecific attack then it is possible one of the openings on the quadrate may have been the point of entry for an attacker's tooth from which the infection entered.

Avascular necrosis has been reported by many studies to be present in every examined specimen of M. lemonnieri and M. conodon. In examinations of M. conodon fossils from Alabama and New Jersey and M. lemonnieri fossils from Belgium, Rothschild and Martin in 2005 observed that the condition affected between 3-17% of the vertebrae in the mosasaurs' spines. Avascular necrosis is a common result of decompression illness; it involves bone damage caused by the formation of nitrogen bubbles from inhaled air decompressed during frequent deep-diving trips, or by intervals of repetitive diving and short breathing. This indicates that both Mosasaurus species may have either been habitual deep-divers or repetitive divers. Agnete Weinreich Carlsen considered it the simplest explanation that such conditions were a product of inadequate anatomical adaptation. Nevertheless, fossils of other mosasaurs with invariable avascular necrosis still exhibit substantial adaptations like eardrums that were well-protected from rapid changes in pressure.

Unnatural fusion of tail vertebrae has been documented in Mosasaurus, which occurs when the bones remodel themselves after damage from trauma or disease. A 2015 study by Rothschild and Everhart surveyed 15 Mosasaurus specimens from North America and Belgium and found cases of fused tail vertebrae in three of them. (Note: Two of the 15 surveyed fossils were reported from the Niobrara Formation, a deposit that Mosasaurus was previously thought but is no longer recognized to be present in.) Two of these cases displayed irregular surface deformities around the fusion site caused by drainage of the vertebral sinuses, which is indicative of a bone infection. The causes of such infections are uncertain, but records of fused vertebrae in other mosasaurs suggest attacks by sharks and other predators as a possible candidate. The third case was determined to be caused by a form of arthritis based on the formation of smooth bridging between fused vertebrae.

=== Life history ===
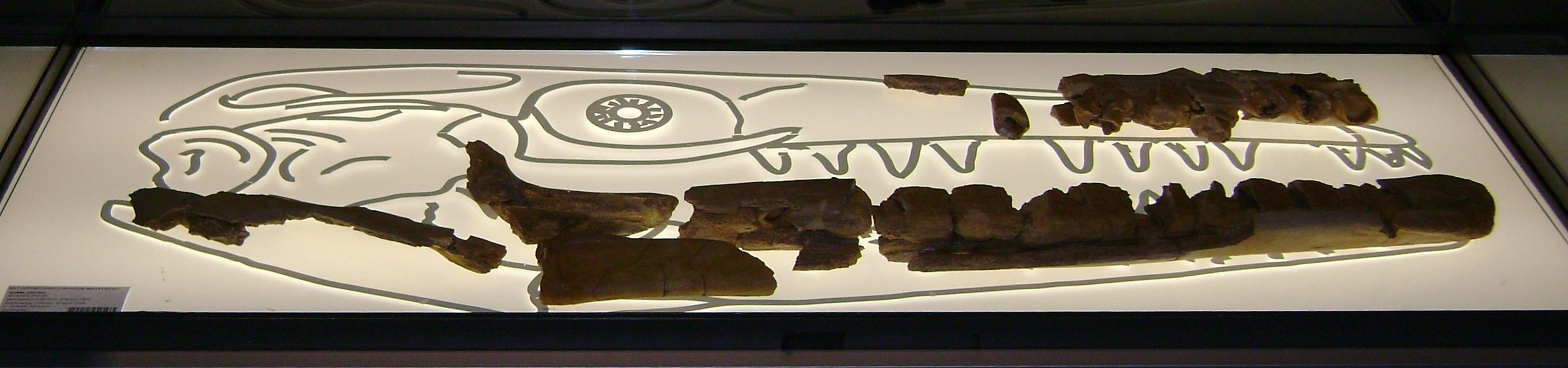
Fragmentary skull of a juvenile Mosasaurus (NHMM 200793) from Geulhem, Netherlands

It is likely that Mosasaurus was viviparous (giving live birth) like most modern mammals today. There is no evidence for live birth in Mosasaurus itself, but it is known in a number of other mosasaurs; examples include a skeleton of a pregnant Carsosaurus, a Plioplatecarpus fossil associated with fossils of two mosasaur embryos, and fossils of newborn Clidastes from pelagic (open ocean) deposits. Such fossil records, along with a total absence of any evidence suggesting external egg-based reproduction, indicates the likeliness of viviparity in Mosasaurus. Microanatomical studies on bones of juvenile Mosasaurus and related genera have found that their bone structures are comparable to adults. They do not exhibit the bone mass increase found in juvenile primitive mosasauroids to support buoyancy associated with a lifestyle in shallow water, implying that Mosasaurus was precocial: They were already efficient swimmers and lived fully functional lifestyles in open water at a very young age and did not require nursery areas to raise their young. Some areas in Europe and South Dakota have yielded concentrated assemblages of juvenile M. hoffmanni, M. missouriensis and/or M. lemonnieri. These localities are all shallow ocean deposits, suggesting that juvenile Mosasaurus may still have lived in shallow waters.

== Paleoecology ==
=== Distribution, ecosystem, and ecological impact ===
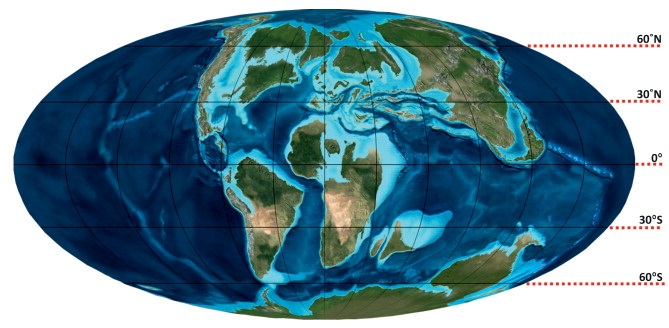
Mosasaurus inhabited the Western Interior Seaway of North America and Mediterranean Tethys of Europe and Africa.

Mosasaurus had a transatlantic distribution, with its fossils having been found in marine deposits on both sides of the Atlantic Ocean. These localities include the Midwest and East Coast of the United States, Canada, Europe, Turkey, Russia, the Levant, the African coastline from Morocco to South Africa, Brazil, Argentina, and Antarctica. During the Late Cretaceous, these regions made up the three seaways inhabited by Mosasaurus: the Atlantic Ocean, the Western Interior Seaway, and the Mediterranean Tethys. Multiple oceanic climate zones encompassed the seaways, including tropical, subtropical, temperate, and subpolar climates. The wide range of oceanic climates yielded a large diversity of fauna that coexisted with Mosasaurus.

==== Mediterranean Tethys ====
The Mediterranean Tethys during the Maastrichtian stage was located in what is now Europe, Africa, and the Middle East. In recent studies, the confirmation of paleogeographical affinities extended this range to areas across the Atlantic including Brazil and the East Coast state of New Jersey. It is geographically subdivided into two biogeographic provinces that respectively include the northern and southern Tethyan margins. The two mosasaurs Mosasaurus and Prognathodon appear to have been the dominant taxa, being widespread and ecologically diversified throughout the seaway.

The northern Tethyan margin was located around the paleolatitudes of 30–40°N, consisting of what is now the European continent, Turkey, and New Jersey. At the time, Europe was a scattering of islands with most of the modern continental landmass being underwater. The margin provided a warm-temperate climate with habitats dominated by mosasaurs and sea turtles. M. hoffmanni and Prognathodon sectorius were the dominant species in the northern province. In certain areas such as Belgium, other Mosasaurus species like M. lemonnieri were instead the dominant species, where its occurrences greatly outnumber those of other large mosasaurs. Other mosasaurs found in the European side of the northern Tethyan margin include smaller genera such as Halisaurus, Plioplatecarpus, and Platecarpus; the shell-crusher Carinodens; and larger mosasaurs of similar trophic levels including Tylosaurus bernardi and four other species of Prognathodon. Sea turtles such as Allopleuron hoffmanni and Glyptochelone suickerbuycki were also prevalent in the area and other marine reptiles including indeterminate elasmosaurs have been occasionally found. Marine reptile assemblages in the New Jersey region of the province are generally equivalent with those in Europe; the mosasaur faunae are quite similar but exclude M. lemonnieri, Carinodens, Tylosaurus, and certain species of Halisaurus and Prognathodon. In addition, they exclusively feature M. conodon, Halisaurus platyspondylus and Prognathodon rapax. Many types of sharks such as Squalicorax, Cretalamna, Serratolamna, and sand sharks, as well as bony fish such as Cimolichthys, the saber-toothed herring Enchodus, and the swordfish-like Protosphyraena are represented in the northern Tethyan margin.

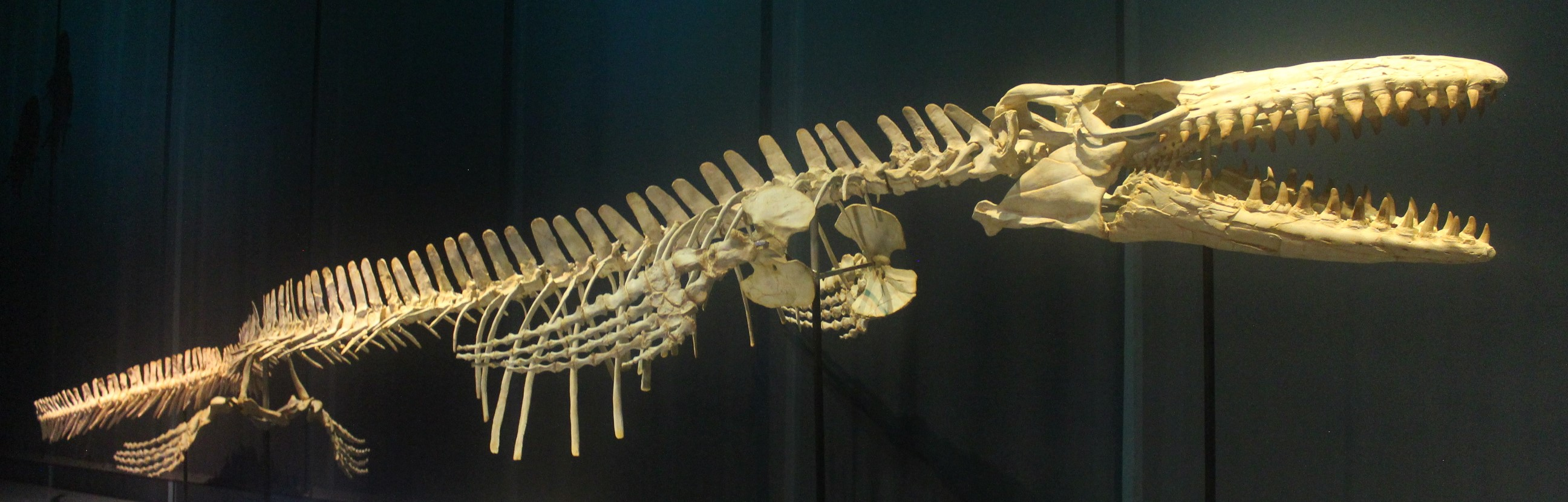
Skeleton of M. beaugei, which is known from Morocco and Brazil

The southern Tethyan margin was located along the equator between 20°N and 20°S, resulting in warmer tropical climates. Seabeds bordering the cratons in Africa and Arabia and extending to the Levant and Brazil provided vast shallow marine environments. These environments were dominated by mosasaurs and marine side-necked turtles. Of the mosasaurs, Globidens phosphaticus is the characteristic species of the southern province; in the African and Arabian domain, Halisaurus arambourgi and 'Platecarpus ptychodon' (Note: A dubious taxon that may represent various mosasaurs such as Gavialimimus or Platecarpus somenensis) were also common mosasaurs alongside Globidens. Mosasaurus was not well-represented: the distribution of M. beaugei was restricted to Morocco and Brazil and isolated teeth from Syria suggested a possible presence of M. lemonnieri, although M. hoffmanni also had some presence throughout the province. Other mosasaurs from the southern Tethyan margin include the enigmatic Goronyosaurus, the shell-crushers Igdamanosaurus and Carinodens, Eremiasaurus, four other species of Prognathodon, and various other species of Halisaurus. Other marine reptiles such as the marine monitor lizard Pachyvaranus and the sea snake Palaeophis are known there. Aside from Zarafasaura in Morocco, plesiosaurs were scarce. As a tropical area, bony fish such as Enchodus and Stratodus and various sharks were common throughout the southern Tethyan margin.

==== Western Interior Seaway ====
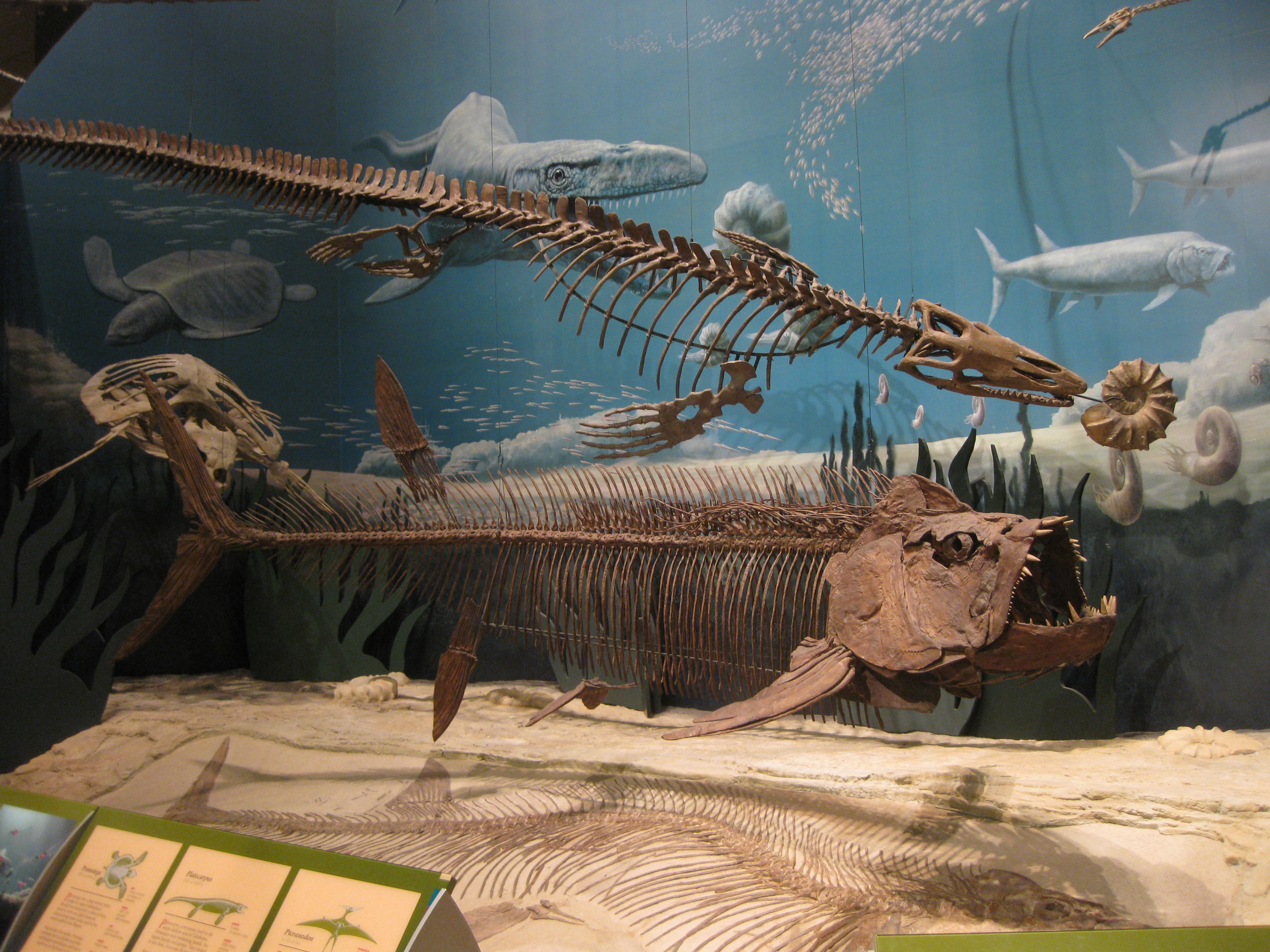
Mosasaurus coexisted with bony fish such as Xiphactinus, sea turtles like Protostega and plioplatecarpine mosasaurs in North America.

Many of the earliest fossils of Mosasaurus were found in Campanian stage deposits in North America, including the Western Interior Seaway, an inland sea which once flowed through what is now the central United States and Canada, and connected the Arctic Ocean to the modern-day Gulf of Mexico. The region was shallow for a seaway, reaching a maximum depth of about 800–900 meters (2,600–3,000 ft). Extensive drainage from the neighboring continents, Appalachia and Laramidia, brought in vast amounts of sediment. Together with the formation of a nutrient-rich deepwater mass from the mixing of continental freshwater, Arctic waters from the north, and warmer saline Tethyan waters from the south, this created a warm and productive seaway that supported a rich diversity of marine life.

The biogeography of the region has been subdivided into two Interior Subprovinces characterized by different climates and faunal structures, and their borders are separated in modern-day Kansas. The oceanic climate of the Northern Interior Subprovince was likely a cool temperate one, while the Southern Interior Subprovince had warm temperate to subtropical climates. The fossil assemblages throughout these regions suggest a complete faunal turnover when M. missouriensis and M. conodon appeared at 79.5 Ma, indicating that the presence of Mosasaurus in the Western Interior Seaway had a profound impact on the restructuring of marine ecosystems. The faunal structure of both provinces was generally much more diverse prior to the appearance of Mosasaurus, during a faunal stage known as the Niobraran Age, than it was during the following Navesinkan Age.

In what is now Alabama within the Southern Interior Subprovince, most of the key genera including sharks like Cretoxyrhina and the mosasaurs Clidastes, Tylosaurus, Globidens, Halisaurus, and Platecarpus disappeared and were replaced by Mosasaurus. During the Navesinkan Age, Mosasaurus dominated the whole region, accounting for around two-thirds of all mosasaur diversity with Plioplatecarpus and Prognathodon sharing the remaining third. The Northern Interior Subprovince also saw a restructuring of mosasaur assemblages, characterized by the disappearance of mosasaurs like Platecarpus and their replacement by Mosasaurus and Plioplatecarpus. Some Niobraran genera such as Tylosaurus, Cretoxyrhina, hesperornithids, and plesiosaurs including elasmosaurs such as Terminonatator and polycotylids like Dolichorhynchops maintained their presence until around the end of the Campanian, during which the entire Western Interior Seaway started receding from the north. Mosasaurus continued to be the dominant genus in the seaway until the end of the Navesinkan Age at the end of the Cretaceous. Contemporaneous fauna included sea turtles such as Protostega and Archelon; many species of sea birds including Baptornis, Ichthyornis, and Halimornis; sharks such as the mackerel sharks Cretalamna, Squalicorax, Pseudocorax, and Serratolamna, the goblin shark Scapanorhynchus, the sand tiger Odontaspis, and the sawfish-like Ischyrhiza; and bony fish such as Enchodus, Protosphyraena, Stratodus, and the ichthyodectids Xiphactinus and Saurodon.

==== Antarctica ====
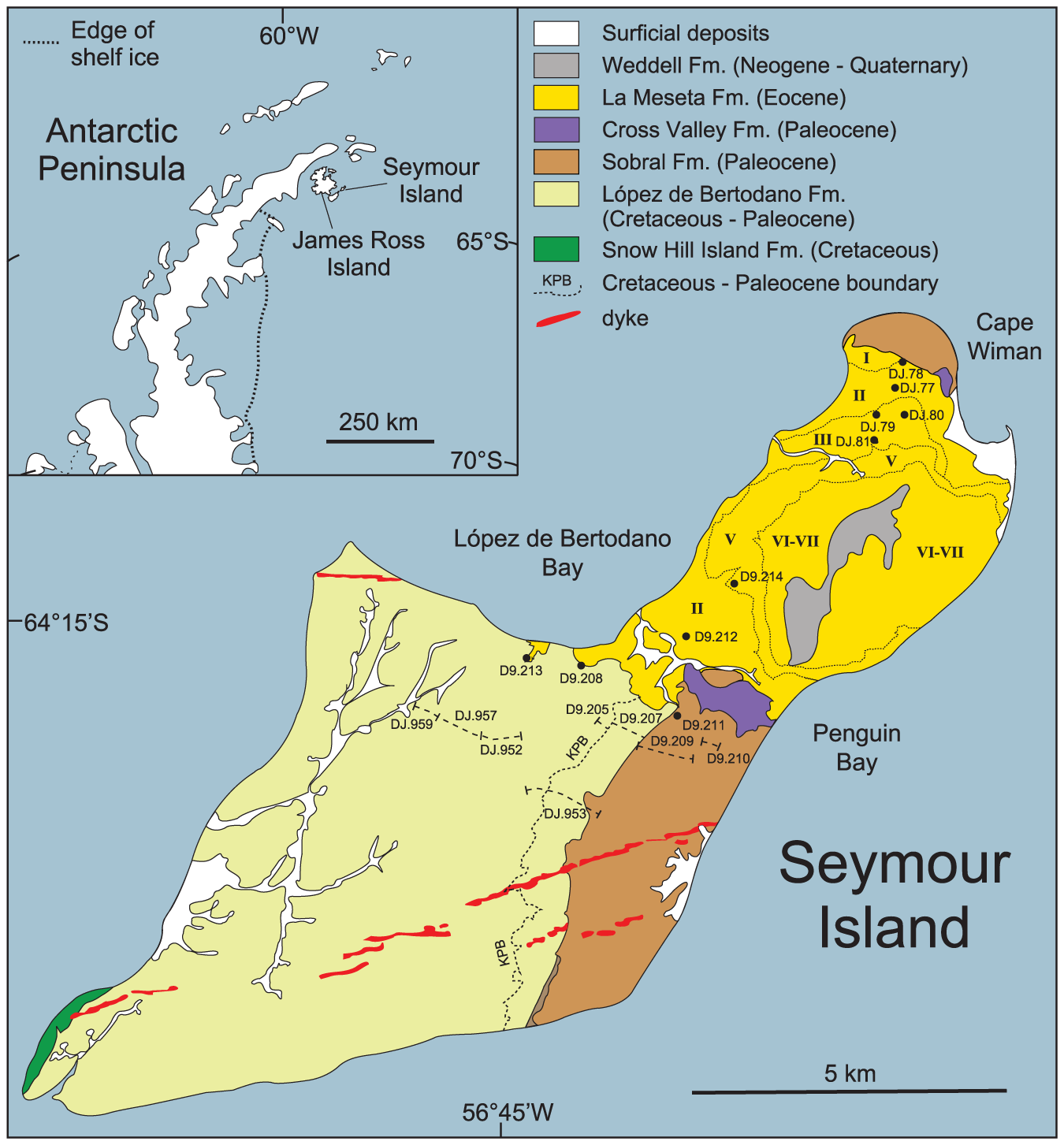
Mosasaurus fossils were found in the Seymour Island of Antarctica, which once provided cool temperate waters.

Mosasaurus is known from late Maastrichtian deposits in the Antarctic Peninsula, specifically the López de Bertodano Formation in Seymour Island. Located within the polar circle at around 65°S, temperatures at medium to large water depths would have been around 6 °C (43 °F) on average, while sea surface temperatures may have dropped below freezing and sea ice may have formed at times. Mosasaurus appears to be the most diverse mosasaur in the Maastrichtian Antarctica. At least two species of Mosasaurus have been described, but the true number of species is unknown as remains are often fragmentary and specimens are described in open nomenclature. These species include one comparable with M. lemonnieri, and another that appears to be closely related to M. hoffmanni. M. sp. has also been described. However, it is possible that such specimens may actually represent Moanasaurus, although this depends on the outcome of a pending revision of the genus. At least four other mosasaur genera have been reported in Antarctica, including Plioplatecarpus, the mosasaurines Moanasaurus and Liodon, and Kaikaifilu. The validity of some of these genera is disputed as they are primarily based on isolated teeth. Prognathodon and Globidens are also expected to be present based on distribution trends of both genera, although conclusive fossils have yet to be found. Other Antarctic marine reptiles included elasmosaurid plesiosaurs like Aristonectes and other indeterminate elasmosaurids. The fish assemblage of the López de Bertodano Formation was dominated by Enchodus and ichthyodectiformes.

=== Habitat preference ===
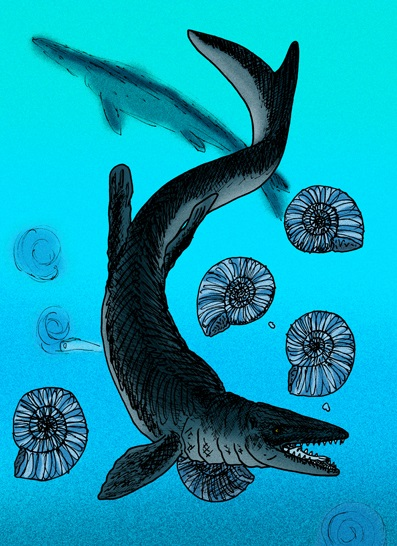
Mosasaurus inhabited offshore ocean habitats of various depths.

Known fossils of Mosasaurus have typically been recovered from deposits representing nearshore habitats during the Cretaceous period, with some fossils coming from deeper-water deposits. Lingham-Soliar (1995) elaborated on this, finding that Maastrichtian deposits in the Netherlands with M. hoffmanni occurrences represented nearshore waters around 40–50 meters (130–160 ft) deep. Changing temperatures and an abundance in marine life were characteristic of these localities. The morphological build of M. hoffmanni, nevertheless, was best adapted for a pelagic surface lifestyle.

δ^{13}C is also correlated with a marine animal's feeding habitat as isotope levels deplete when habitat is farther from the shoreline, so some scientists interpreted isotope levels as a proxy for habitat preference. Separate studies involving multiple Mosasaurus specimens have yielded consistently low δ^{13}C levels of tooth enamel, indicating that Mosasaurus fed in more offshore or open waters. It has been pointed out how δ^{13}C can be influenced by other factors in an animal's lifestyle, such as diet and diving behavior. To account for this, a 2014 study by T. Lynn Harrell Jr. and Alberto Perez-Huerta examined the concentration ratios of neodymium, gadolinium, and ytterbium in M. hoffmanni and Mosasaurus sp. fossils from Alabama, the Demopolis Chalk, and the Hornerstown Formation. Previous studies demonstrated that ratios of these three elements can act as a proxy for relative ocean depth of a fossil during early diagenesis without interference from biological processes, with each of the three elements signifying either shallow, deep, or fresh waters. The rare earth element ratios were very consistent throughout most of the examined Mosasaurus fossils, indicating consistent habitat preference, and clustered towards a ratio representing offshore habitats with ocean depths deeper than 50 meters (160 ft).

=== Interspecific competition ===
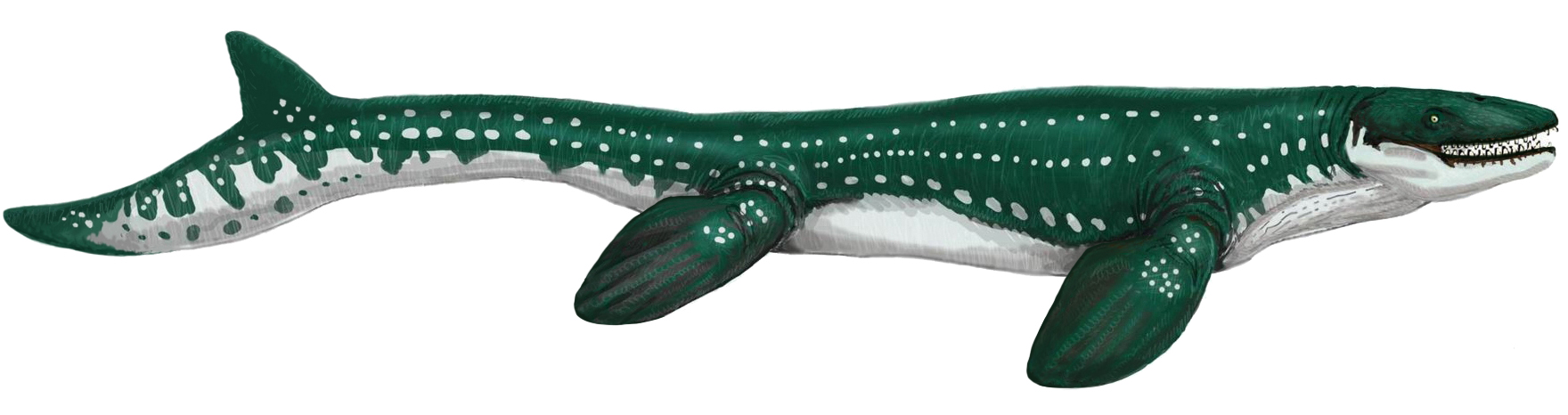
Mosasaurus was able to coexist with other large predatory mosasaurs like Prognathodon through niche partitioning.

Mosasaurus lived alongside other large predatory mosasaurs also considered apex predators, most prominent among them being the tylosaurines and Prognathodon. Tylosaurus bernardi, the only surviving species of the genus during the Maastrichtian, measured up to 12.2 meters (40 ft) in length while the largest coexisting species of Prognathodon like P. saturator exceeded 12 meters (39 ft). These three mosasaurs preyed on similar animals such as marine reptiles.

A study published in 2013 by Schulp and colleagues specifically tested how mosasaurs such as M. hoffmanni and P. saturator were able to coexist in the same localities through δ^{13}C analysis. The scientists utilized an interpretation that differences in isotope values can help explain the level of resource partitioning because it is influenced by multiple environmental factors such as lifestyle, diet, and habitat preference. Comparisons between the δ^{13}C levels in multiple teeth of M. hoffmanni and P. saturator from the Maastrichtian-age Maastricht Formation showed that while there was some convergence between certain specimens, the average δ^{13}C values between the two species were on average different. This is one indication of niche partitioning, where the two mosasaur genera likely foraged in different habitats or had different specific diets to coexist without direct competitive conflict. The teeth of P. saturator are much more robust than those of M. hoffmanni and were specifically equipped for preying on robust prey like turtles. While M. hoffmanni also preyed on turtles, its teeth were built to handle a wider range of prey less suited for P. saturator.

Another case of presumed niche partitioning between Mosasaurus and Prognathodon from the Bearpaw Formation in Alberta was documented in a 2014 study by Konishi and colleagues. The study found a dietary divide between M. missouriensis and P. overtoni based on stomach contents. Stomach contents of P. overtoni included turtles and ammonites, providing another example of a diet specialized for harder prey. In contrast, M. missouriensis had stomach contents consisting of fish, indicative of a diet specialized in softer prey. It was hypothesized that these adaptations helped maintain resource partitioning between the two mosasaurs.

Nevertheless, competitive engagement evidently could not be entirely avoided. There is also evidence of aggressive interspecific combat between Mosasaurus and other large mosasaur species. This is shown from a fossil skull of a subadult M. hoffmanni with fractures caused by a massive concentrated blow to the braincase; Lingham-Soliar (1998) argued that this blow was dealt by a ramming attack by H. bernardi, as the formation of the fractures were characteristic of a coordinated strike (and not an accident or fossilization damage), and H. bernardi was the only known coexisting animal likely capable of causing such damage, using its robust arrow-like elongated snout. This sort of attack has been compared to the defensive behavior of bottlenose dolphins using their beaks to kill or repel lemon sharks, and it has been speculated that H. bernardi dealt the offensive attack via an ambush on an unsuspecting Mosasaurus.

== Extinction ==
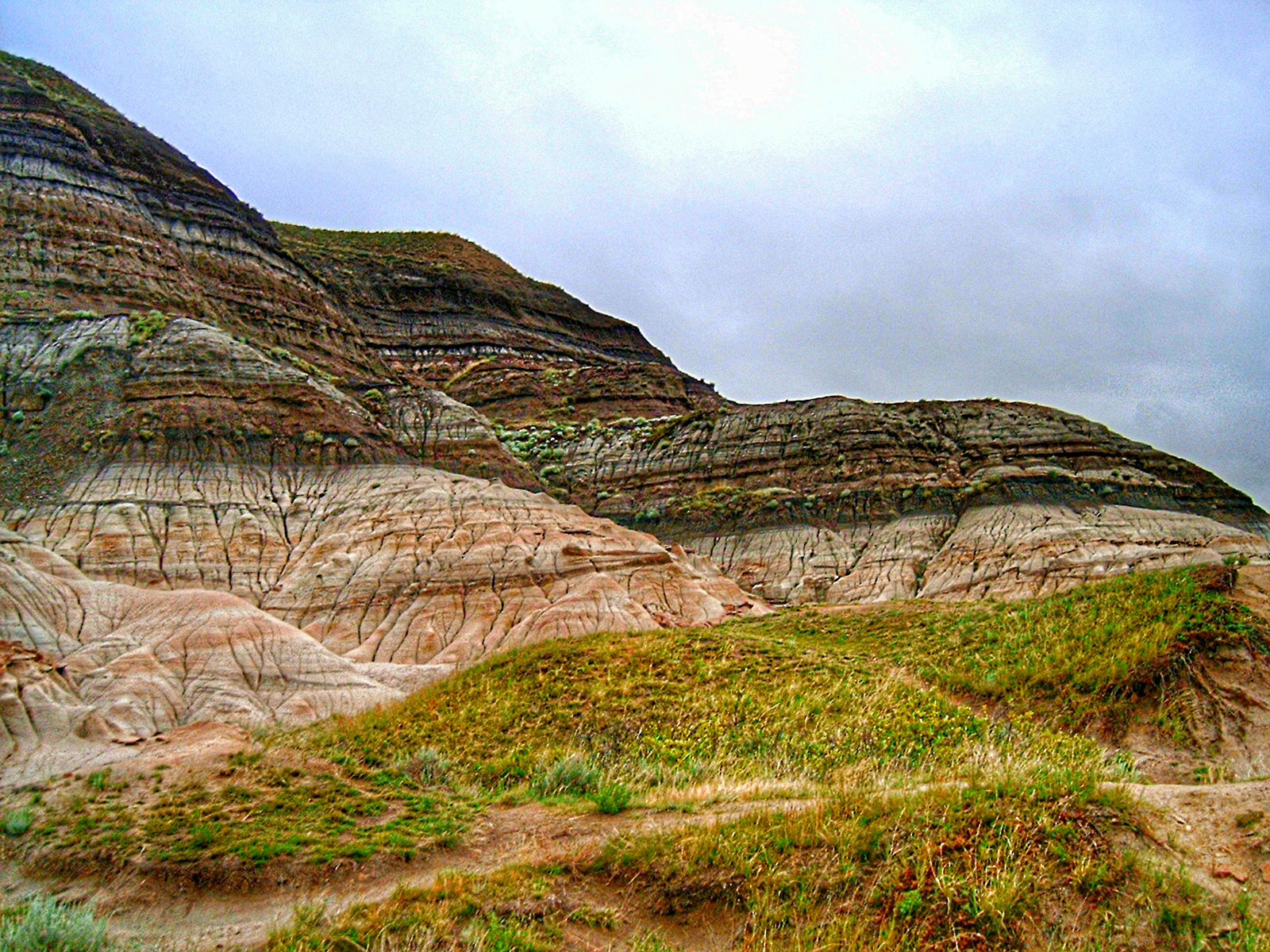
Mosasaurus went extinct as a result of the K-Pg extinction event; its last fossils were found at or close to the boundary, which is represented by the thick dark band separating the lighter and darker layers of this cliff.

By the end of the Cretaceous, mosasaurs were at the height of their evolutionary radiation, and their extinction was a sudden event. During the late Maastrichtian, global sea levels dropped, draining the continents of their nutrient-rich seaways and altering circulation and nutrient patterns, and reducing the number of available habitats for Mosasaurus. The genus adapted by accessing new habitats in more open waters. The last fossils of Mosasaurus, which include those of M. hoffmanni and indeterminate species, occur up to the Cretaceous-Paleogene boundary (K-Pg boundary). The demise of the genus was likely a result of the Cretaceous-Paleogene extinction event which also wiped out the non-avian dinosaurs. Mosasaurus fossils have been found less than 15 meters (49 ft) below the boundary in the Maastricht Formation, the Davutlar Formation in Turkey, the Jagüel Formation in Argentina, Stevns Klint in Denmark, Seymour Island, and Missouri.

M. hoffmanni fossils have been found within the K-Pg boundary itself in southeastern Missouri between the Paleocene Clayton Formation and Cretaceous Owl Creek Formation. Fossil vertebrae from the layer were found with fractures formed after death. The layer was likely deposited as a tsunamite, alternatively nicknamed the "Cretaceous cocktail deposit". This formed through a combination of catastrophic seismic and geological disturbances, mega-hurricanes, and giant tsunamis caused by the impact of the Chicxulub asteroid that catalyzed the K-Pg extinction event. As well as physical destruction, the impact also blocked out sunlight leading to a collapse of marine food webs. Any Mosasaurus surviving the immediate cataclysms by taking refuge in deeper waters would have died out due to starvation from a loss of prey.

One enigmatic occurrence of Mosasaurus sp. fossils is in the Hornerstown Formation, a deposit typically dated to be from the Paleocene Danian age, which was immediately after the Maastrichtian age. The fossils were found in association with fossils of Squalicorax, Enchodus, and various ammonites within a uniquely fossil-rich bed at the base of the Hornerstown Formation known as the Main Fossiliferous Layer. This does not mean Mosasaurus and its associated fauna survived the K-Pg extinction. According to one hypothesis, the fossils may have originated from an earlier Cretaceous deposit and were reworked into the Paleocene formation during its early deposition. Evidence of reworking typically comes from fossils worn down due to further erosion during their exposure at the time of redeposition. Many of the Mosasaurus fossils from the Main Fossiliferous Layer consist of isolated bones commonly abraded and worn, but the layer also yielded better-preserved Mosasaurus remains. Another explanation suggests the Main Fossiliferous Layer is a Maastrichtian time-averaged remanié deposit, which means it originated from a Cretaceous deposit with winnowed low-sediment conditions. A third hypothesis proposes that the layer is a lag deposit of Cretaceous sediments forced out by a strong impact by a tsunami, and what remained was subsequently refilled with Cenozoic fossils.

== See also ==
- Plotosaurus
- Eremiasaurus
- Moanasaurus
