= Satoshi =

- Pronunciation: Satoshi
- Gender: Male

Origin
- Origin: Japanese
- Region of origin: Japanese

Other names
- Related names: Japanese

Satoshi (さとし, サトシ) is a generally masculine Japanese given name.

== Written forms ==
- 哲, "intelligent, philosophy, clear"
- 悟, "bodhi, enlightenment, apprehension"
- 敏, "quick, sharp"
- 智, "knowledge, wisdom"
- 聡, "intelligent, clever, bright"
- 慧, "bright, intelligent"
- 訓, "teach, instruct"
- 諭, "teach, to lead"
- 里, "hometown, birthplace, one's origins, one's upbringing, one's past"
- 市, "market, city, town"

== People with the name ==
- Satoshi (born 1998), Moldovan singer
- Satoshi Arai (荒井 聰; born 1946), Japanese politician
- Satoshi Asano (浅野 哲; born 1982), Japanese politician
- Satoshi Ashikawa (芦川 聡; 1953–1983), Japanese musician, composer, producer and record store owner
- Satoshi Dezaki (出﨑 哲; born 1940), Japanese anime director, producer and screenwriter
- Satoshi Fujii (藤井 聡; born 1968), Japanese civil engineer, economist and social critic
- Satoshi Fujimaru (藤丸 敏; born 1960), Japanese politician
- Satoshi Fujimoto (藤本 聰; born 1975), Japanese Paralympic judoka
- Satoshi Fujisaki (藤崎 聡; born 1968), Japanese mixed martial artist
- Satoshi Fujita (藤田 智; born 1959), Japanese horticulturalist and professor
- Satoshi Fukuda (福田 聡志; born 1983), Japanese former professional baseball pitcher
- Satoshi Fukuoka (福岡 聡; born 1965), Japanese mixed martial artist
- Satoshi Fukushima (福島 智; born 1962), Japanese researcher and advocate
- Satoshi Furukawa (古川 聡; born 1964), Japanese surgeon and astronaut
- Satoshi Furuno (古野 慧; born 1999), Japanese freestyle skier
- Satoshi Goto (後藤 哲; born 1971), Japanese voice actor
- Satoshi Hamada (浜田 聡; born 1977), Japanese politician
- Satoshi Hashimoto (橋本 さとし; born 1966), Japanese actor and voice actor
- Satoshi Hatakeyama (畠山 智之; born 1958), Japanese journalist
- Satoshi Hida (飛弾 暁; born 1984), Japanese former football player
- Satoshi Higashi (東 聡; born 1960), Japanese professional golfer
- Satoshi Hino (日野 聡; born 1978), Japanese voice actor
- Satoshi Hirayama (平山 智; 1930–2021), American baseball player
- Satoshi Hirose (廣瀬 敏; born 1976), Japanese former cyclist
- Satoshi Hiyamizu (冷水 佐壽; 1943–2019), Japanese professor
- Satoshi Honma (本間 聡; born 1968), Japanese former mixed martial artist
- Satoshi Horinouchi (堀之内 聖; born 1979), Japanese former football player
- Satoshi Iida (飯田 覚士; born 1969), Japanese professional boxer
- Satoshi Iizuka (飯塚 悟史; born 1993), Japanese professional baseball player
- Satoshi Inoue (musician) (井上 智; born 1959), Japanese jazz guitarist
- Satoshi Inoue (politician) (井上 哲士; born 1958), Japanese politician
- Satoshi Irifune (入船 敏; born 1975), Japanese long-distance runner
- Satoshi Iriki (入來 智; 1967—2023), Japanese baseball player
- Satoshi Ishii (石井 慧; born 1986), Japanese judoka and mixed martial artist
- Satoshi Iwabuchi (岩渕 聡; born 1975), Japanese retired professional tennis player
- Satoshi Kadokura (門倉 聡; born 1959), Japanese composer, arranger, producer and keyboardist
- Satoshi Kajino (梶野 智; born 1965), Japanese former football player
- Satoshi Kako (加古 里子; 1926–2018), Japanese author and illustrator
- Satoshi Kamiya (神谷 哲史; born 1981), Japanese origami master
- Satoshi Kanazawa (サトシ カナザワ; born 1962), American-British evolutionary psychologist
- Satoshi Kashima (加島 聰), Japanese civil engineer
- Satoshi Kataoka (片岡 聡; born 1958), Japanese professional Go player
- Satoshi Kawata (河田 聡; born 1951), Japanese scientist
- Satoshi Kikuchi (菊池 悟; 1952–2019), Japanese handball player
- Satoshi Kinsui (金水 敏; born 1956), Japanese linguist
- Satoshi Kirishima (桐島 聡; 1954–2024), Japanese communist revolutionary
- Satoshi Kitamura (きたむら さとし; born 1956), Japanese Illustrator
- Satoshi Kobayashi (小林 聡; born 1972), Japanese Muay Thai fighter and kickboxer
- Satoshi Kodaira (小平 智; born 1989), Japanese professional golfer
- Satoshi Koga (古賀 聡; born 1970), Japanese former football player
- Satoshi Koizumi (小泉 聡; born 1987), Japanese curler
- Satoshi Kojima (小島 聡; born 1970), Japanese professional wrestler
- Satoshi Komatsu (小松 聖; born 1981), Japanese baseball player
- Satoshi Kon (今 敏; 1963–2010), film director, animator, screenwriter and manga artist
- Satoshi Kondo (born 1984), Japanese artistic
- Satoshi Kukino (久木野 聡; born 1987), Japanese retired football player
- Satoshi Kuribayashi (栗林 慧; born 1939), Japanese photographer
- Satoshi Kuroda (黒田 哲史; born 1975), Japanese former professional baseball infielder and current coach
- Satoshi Kuwata (born 1983), Japanese fashion designer
- Satoshi Maruo (丸尾 知司; born 1991), Japanese male athlete
- Satoshi Maruya (丸谷 里志; born 1947), Japanese swimmer
- Satoshi Mashimo (真下 佐登史; born 1974), Japanese former football player
- Satoshi Matsuda (松田 悟志; born 1978), Japanese actor
- Satoshi Matsui (松井 聰; 1915–1995), Japanese basketball player
- Satoshi Matsuoka (松岡 聡), Japanese computer scientist
- Satoshi Mikami (三上 哲; born 1968), Japanese actor and voice actor
- Satoshi Miki (三木 聡; born 1961), Japanese film director and screenwriter
- Satoshi Mitazono (三反園 訓; born 1958), Japanese journalist and the governor of Kagoshima Prefecture
- Satoshi Miyagawa (宮川 悟; born 1977), Japanese former football player
- Satoshi Miyagi (宮城 聰; born 1959), Japanese theatre director
- Satoshi Miyauchi (宮内 聡; born 1959), Japanese former football player and manager
- Satoshi Mizukami (水上 悟志; born 1980), Japanese manga artist
- Satoshi Mori (basketball) (森 哲; born 1949), Japanese basketball player
- Satoshi Mori (skier) (森 敏; born 1971), Japanese Nordic combined skier
- Satoshi Morimoto (森本 敏; born 1941), Japanese scholar
- Satoshi Motoyama (本山 哲; born 1971), Japanese race car driver
- Satoshi Murayama (村山 聖; 1969–1998), Japanese professional shogi player
- Satoshi Nagai (永井 怜; born 1984), Japanese former professional baseball pitcher
- Satoshi Nagano (長野 聡; born 1982), Japanese football player
- Satoshi Nakajima (中嶋 聡; born 1969), Japanese former professional baseball catcher
- Satoshi Nakamoto (fl. 2008–2011), a presumed pseudonym of the creator of bitcoin, a digital currency
- Satoshi Nakamura (中村 哲; born 1958), Japanese computer scientist
- Satoshi Nakanishi (中西 哲; born 1951), Japanese politician
- Satoshi Nakatani (仲谷 聖史; born 1981), Japanese international rugby union player
- Satoshi Nakayama (中山 悟志; born 1981), Japanese former football player
- Satoshi Ninoyu (二之湯 智; born 1944), Japanese politician
- Satoshi Ogawa (小川 聡; born 1983), Japanese sabre fencer
- Satoshi Ohno (大野 智; born 1980), Japanese actor and musician
- Satoshi Ōie (大家 敏志; born 1967), Japanese politician
- Satoshi Okura (大倉 智; born 1969), Japanese former football player
- Satoshi Ōmura (大村 智; born 1935), biochemist, a winner of the 2015 Nobel Prize in Physiology or Medicine
- Satoshi Osaki (大崎 悟史; born 1983), Japanese long-distance runner
- Satoshi Osugi (大杉 啓; born 1996), Japanese footballer
- Satoshi Ōtomo (大友 慧; born 1981), Japanese former footballer
- Satoshi Saida (斎田 悟司; born 1972), Japanese pioneering wheelchair tennis player
- Satoshi Sakashita (坂下 里士; born 1989), Japanese male short track speed skater
- Satoshi Sato (skier) (佐藤 智; born 1962), Japanese cross-country skier
- Satoshi Shiki (士貴 智志; born 1970), Japanese manga artist
- Satoshi Shimizu (清水 聡; born 1986), Japanese boxer
- Satoshi Shingaki (新垣 諭; born 1964), Japanese professional boxer
- Satoshi Shinpo (新保 鋭; born 1941), Japanese speed skater
- Satoshi Sugawara| (born 1959), Japanese bobsledder
- Satoshi Sumida (隅田 敏司; born 1962), Japanese swimmer
- Satoshi Sumita (澄田 智; 1916–2008), Japanese businessman, banker, and the 25th Governor of the Bank of Japan
- Satoshi Suzuki (鈴木 智; born 1963), Japanese screenwriter
- Satoshi Suzuki (mathematician) (鈴木 敏; 1930–1991), Japanese mathematician
- Satoshi Taira (平 聡; born 1970), Japanese former football player
- Satoshi Tajiri (田尻 智; born 1965), creator of Pokémon
- Satoshi Takahashi (高橋 敏; born 1968), Japanese instructor
- Satoshi Takamatsu (高松 聡; born 1963), Japanese artist, creative director, photographer and private astronaut
- Satoshi Takano (高野 智史; born 1993), Japanese shogi player
- Satoshi Takayama (高山 智司; born 1970) Japanese politician
- Satoshi Takayama (高山 智司; born 1986) Japanese politician
- Satoshi Takayanagi (高柳 慧; born 1938), Japanese long jumper
- Satoshi Takebe (武部 聡志; born 1957), Japanese musician, keyboard player, arranger, music director and producer
- Satoshi Takeda (武田 聡; born 1968), Japanese swimmer
- Satoshi Tanaka (田中 聡; born 2002), Japanese footballer
- Satoshi Tezuka (手塚 聡; born 1958), Japanese former football player and manager
- Satoshi Tokiwa (常盤 聡; born 1987), Japanese former footballer
- Satoshi Tokizawa (常澤 聡; born 1985), Japanese football player
- Satoshi Tomiie (富家 哲; born 1966), Japanese DJ and electronic music producer
- Satoshi Tomiura (冨浦 智嗣; born 1991), Japanese actor
- Satoshi Tsumabuki (妻夫木 聡; born 1980), Japanese actor and singer
- Satoshi Tsunami (都並 敏史; born 1961), Japanese football player
- Satoshi Uematsu (植松 聖; born c. 1990), perpetrator of the Sagamihara stabbings
- Satoshi Umemura (梅村 聡; born 1975), Japanese politician
- Satoshi Urushihara (漆原 智志; born 1966), manga artist and artist
- Satoshi Utsunomiya (宇都宮 聡; born 1969), Japanese fossil collector and science writer
- Satosi Watanabe (渡辺 慧; 1910–1993), Japanese theoretical physicist
- Satoshi Watanabe (beach volleyball) (渡辺 聡; born 1975), Japanese beach volleyball player
- Satoshi Yagisawa (八木澤 教司; born 1975), Japanese composer
- Satoshi Yagisawa (writer) (八木沢 里志; born 1977), Japanese author
- Satoshi Yamaguchi (footballer, born 1959) (山口 悟; born 1959), Japanese former football player
- Satoshi Yamaguchi (footballer, born 1978) (山口 智; born 1978), Japanese professional football manager and former player
- Satoshi Yamamoto (山本 サトシ; born 1965), illustrator of Pokémon Adventures starting in volume 10
- Satoshi Yamazaki (山崎 敏; born 1981), Japanese professional Nippon Professional Baseball player
- Satoshi Yanagisawa (柳澤 哲; born 1971), Japanese race walker
- Satoshi Yokoyama (横山 聡; born 1980), Japanese former football player
- Satoshi Yoneyama (footballer) (米山 智; born 1974), Japanese former football player
- Satoshi Yuki (結城 聡; born 1972), Japanese professional Go player
- Satoshi Yūki (結城 智史), a pseudonym of Kouji Miura (b. 1995), a Japanese manga artist

== Fictional characters ==
- Ash Ketchum (known as Satoshi (サトシ) in Japan), the main character in the Pokémon television series
- Satoshi Himuro (氷室 聡), in the Red River universe
- Satoshi Hiwatari (日渡 怜) or Satoshi Hikari (氷狩 怜), in D.N.Angel media
- Satoshi (Urusei Yatsura) (サトシ), also known as Megane, a member of Lum's Stormtroopers
- Satoshi Hojo (北条 悟史), in Higurashi no Naku Koro ni media
- Satoshi Omiya (大宮 智史), a racer in Initial D series
- Satoshi Fukube (福部 里志), in Hyōka
- Satoshi Mochida (持田 哲志), in the Corpse Party series
- Satoshi Isshiki (一色 慧), in the Food Wars: Shokugeki no Soma
- Satoshi Tsuchida (土田 聡史), in the Kuroko's Basketball
