= Keisen =

Keisen may refer to:

- Keisen University
- Keisen, Fukuoka
- Keisen Station
