= Japanese Women =

1995 anthology edited by Kumiko Fujimura-Fanselow and Atsuko Kameda

Japanese Women: New Feminist Perspectives on the Past, Present, and Future
- Editor: Kumiko Fujimura-Fanselow; Atsuko Kameda
- Publisher: The Feminist Press
- Publication date: 1995

Japanese Women: New Feminist Perspectives on the Past, Present, and Future is a collection of twenty-two essays compiled by Kumiko Fujimura-Fanselow and Atsuko Kameda. It was published in 1995 by The Feminist Press. The essays were written by Sachiko Kaneko, Orie Endō, Midori Wakakuwa, Kuniko Funabashi, Mioko Fujeida, Haruko Okano, Chieko M. Ariga, Fukunishi Suzuki, Kimi Hara, Atsuko Kameda, Kumiko Fujimura-Fanselow, Kyōko Yoshizumi, Masami Ohinata, Takado Soderi, Masamori Yamaguchi, Aiko Hada, Emiko Kaya, Naoko Sasakura, Yoko Kawashima Horne, Kazuko Tanada, Yayori Matsui, Mioko Fujieda, Kiyoko Kinjo, and Yoko Sato.
