= Sasagu Arai =

Japanese scholar of New Testament Study (1930–2024)

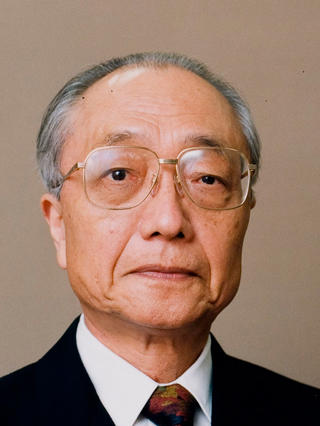
Portrait of Sasagu Araai, published by the Japan Academy

Sasagu Arai (荒井 献, Arai Sasagu; May 6, 1930 – August 16, 2024) was a Japanese scholar of New Testament Study and researcher of early Christianity and Gnosticism. Arai was a Doctor of Theology. Professor emeritus of University of Tokyo and Keisen University (in which he took office as president), and a member of the Japan Academy. He graduated (1962) at Erlangen-Nürnberg University in Germany.

== Award ==
- Prize of Japan Academy (日本学士院賞), 1973
- Prize of Society of Mediterranean Sea (地中海学会賞), 1998

== Life and studies ==
Arai was born in Akita prefecture, and he studied at the Graduate School of Humanities and Sociology of the University of Tokyo. He acquired the Doctor of theology from Erlangen University in Germany.

He and his wife (and daughter Keiko) lived in the early 1960s with the family of the later Bishop of Bavaria and President of the Lutheran World Congress, Johannes Hanselmann, in Grub am Forst, Oberfranken, Germany.

Arai was a pioneer of the studies of Gnosticism after the discovery of the Nag Hammadi library. He made clear that the Gnosticism which had been considered as the heretic in the traditional Christian churches was not heretic, but the different, independent religion through the study of Nag Hammadi library in Coptic. This was already suggested by the philosopher Hans Jonas before the discovery of the Nag Hammadi. Arai published two books in which he discussed the relations between the Christianity and the Gnosticism. First book is Early Christianity and Gnosticism in 1971, and then second book, New Testament and Gnosticism in 1988. Arai adopted the concept of Daseinshaltung by Hans Jonas to elucidate the Gnosticism. He translated and published Evangelium according to Thomas with detailed notes in 1994. As a Christian scholar, he wrote the book Jesus and his Age to make clear the historical figure of Jesus in 1974. He published the book in which he explained the position of women in Christianity.

Arai was selected as a member of the Japan Academy in 2001.

Arai died on August 16, 2024, at the age of 94.

== Works ==
=== Books ===
- Arai, Sasagu (1964). Die Christologie des Evangelium veritatis : eine religionsgeschichtliche Untersuchung. Leiden: E.J.Brill.
- ——— (1971). Early Christianity and Gnosticism. Tōkyō: Iwanami shoten. OCLC 33551535.
- ——— (1974). Jesus and his Age. Tōkyō: Iwanami shoten. OCLC 14945510.
- ——— (1988). New Testament and Gnosticism. Iwanami seminā bukkusu. Vol. 27. Tōkyō: Iwanami shoten. ISBN 9784000048972. OCLC 20629802.
- ——— (1994). Evangelium according to Thomas. Tōkyō: Koudansha.
- ——— (2001). Jesus Christ, Part1, Part2. Tōkyō: Koudansha.
- ——— (June 2001 – June 2002). Collected Works of Arai Sasagu (10 vol. and addendum book. Tōkyō: Iwanami shoten.

=== Edited by ===
- ———, ed. (1997–1998). Nag Hammadi Library (in 4 vol.). Tōkyō: Iwanami shoten.
