= List of informally named fossil reptiles =

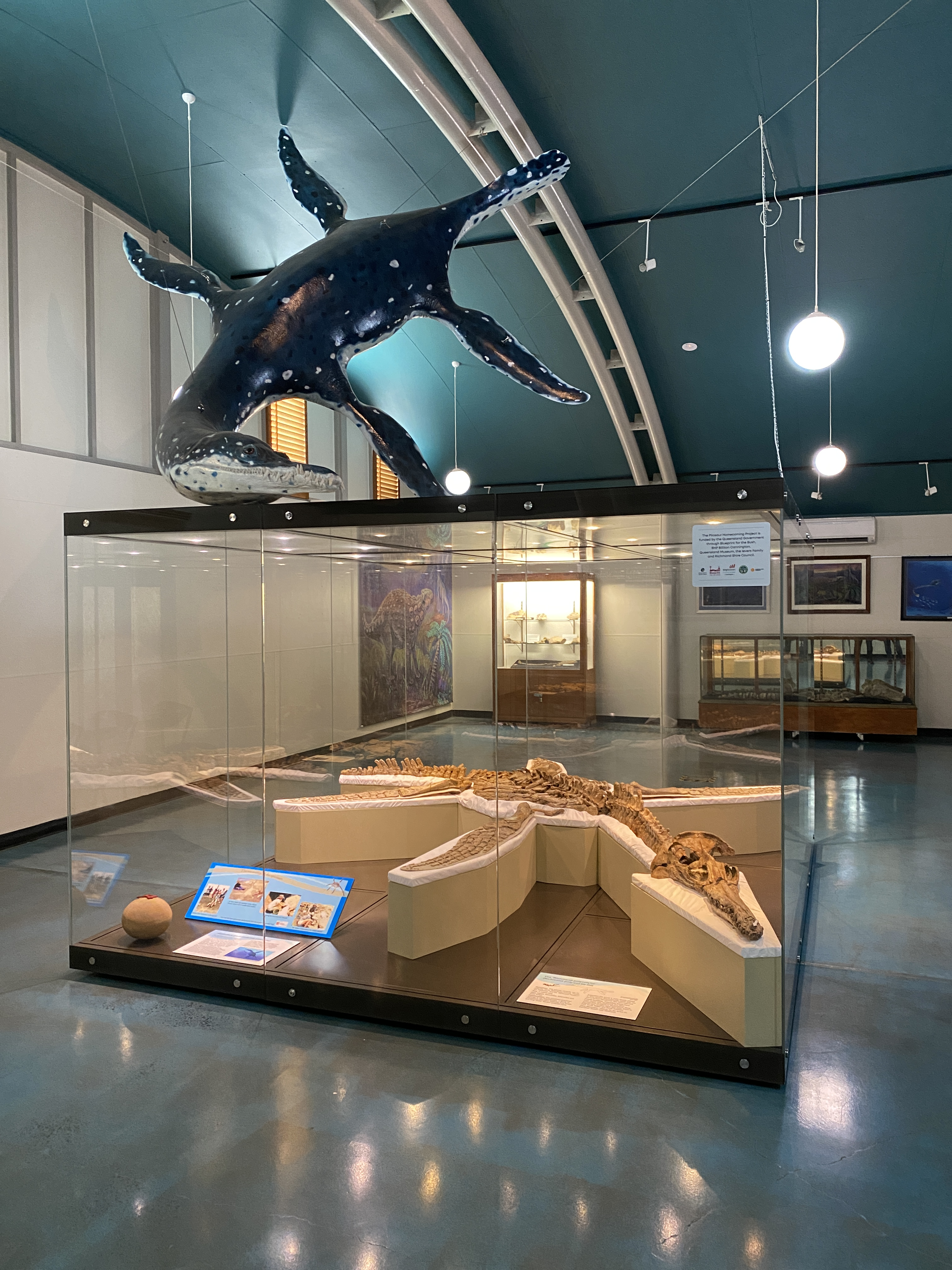
"Richmond pliosaur" in Kronosaurus Korner

This list of informally named fossil reptiles is a listing of prehistoric reptiles (excluding dinosaurs) that have never been given formally published scientific names. This list only includes names that were not properly published ("unavailable names") and have not since been published under a valid name. The following types of names are present on this list:

- Nomen nudum, Latin for "naked name": A name that has appeared in print but has not yet been formally published by the standards of the International Commission on Zoological Nomenclature. Nomina nuda (the plural form) are invalid, and are therefore not italicized as a proper generic name would be.
- Nomen manuscriptum, Latin for "manuscript name": A name that appears in manuscript but was not formally published. A nomen manuscriptum is equivalent to a nomen nudum for everything except the method of publication, and description.
- Nomen ex dissertationae, Latin for "dissertation name": A name that appears in a dissertation but was not formally published.
- Nicknames or descriptive names given to specimens or taxa by researchers or the press.

This list also includes names published in self-published or predatory journals.

== A ==
=== Addyman plesiosaur ===
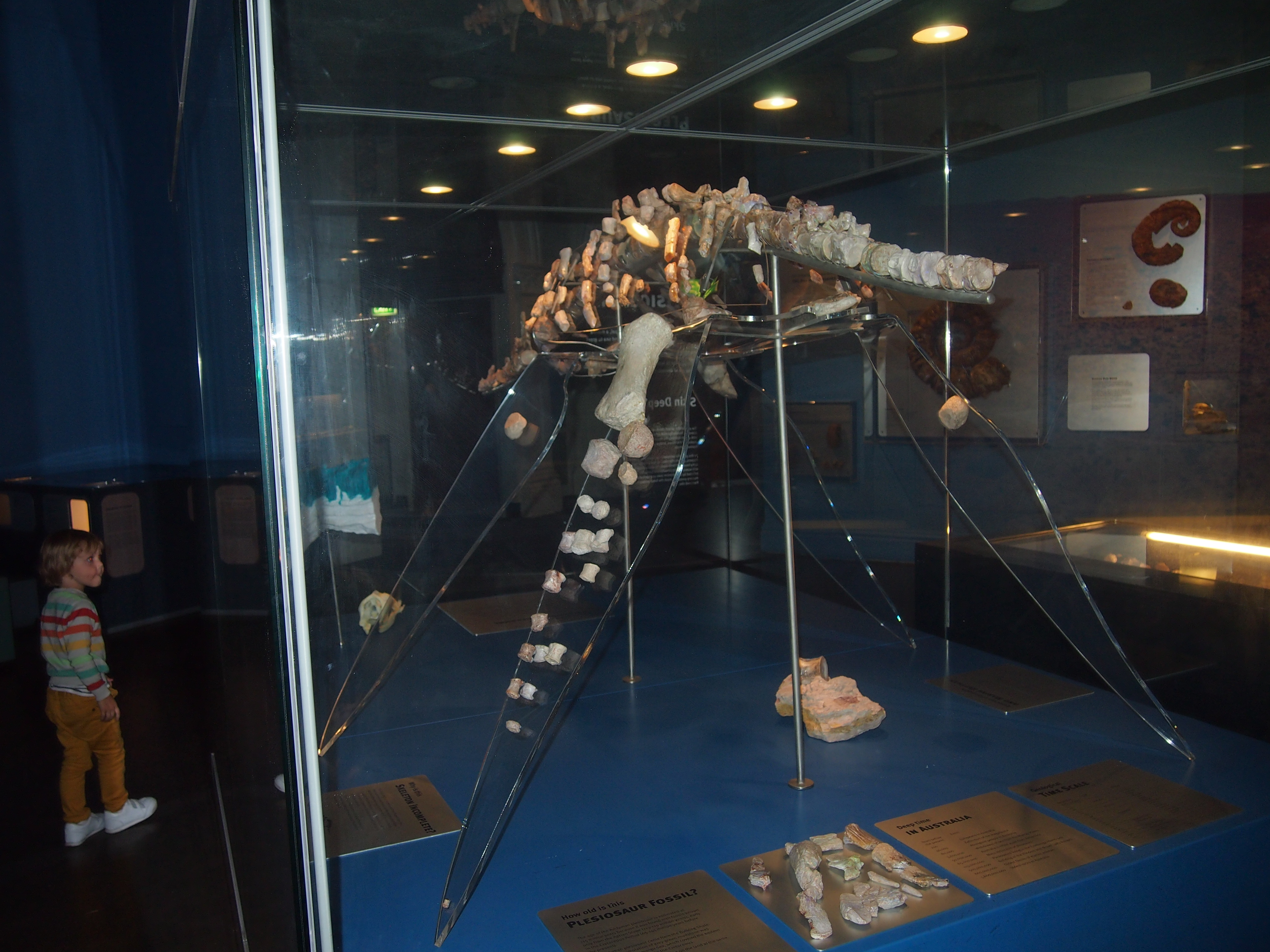
The "Addyman plesiosaur"

The "Addyman plesiosaur" is an informal name given to a leptocleidid plesiosaur specimen (SAM P15980) discovered by the opal miners John and Molly Addyman in 1967 from the Bulldog Shale near Andamooka, South Australia. Assigned to as cf. Leptocleidus sp. in 2007, probably a juvenile Umoonasaurus, this 80% complete skeleton measures 70 cm (28 in) long and represents one of the most immature and smallest known plesiosaur specimens. Housed in the South Australian Museum, the "Addyman plesiosaur" is also dubbed "the finest known opalised skeleton on Earth".

=== African pterosaur ===
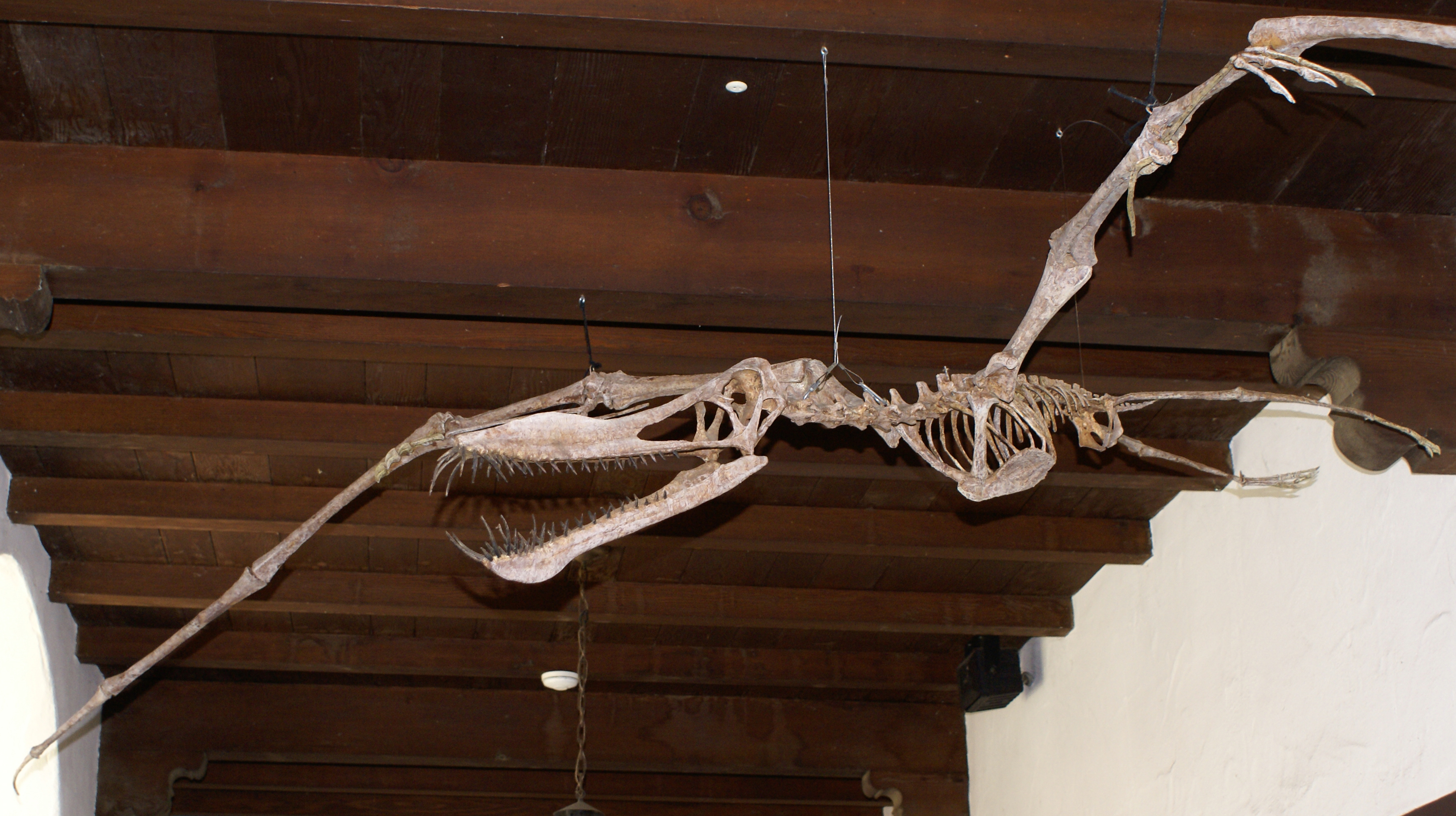
Life-size skeleton reconstruction of the "African pterosaur"

The "African pterosaur" is an informal name given to a pterosaur specimen from the Early Cretaceous of Niger, which was reported by Paul Sereno's team. The specimen is stated to be a partial wing, which is the first known in Africa, and its life-size reconstruction can be seen in the "GIANTS" exhibit in Chicago; although it is unstated which type of pterosaur this specimen belongs to, it is noted to be a piscivore (fish-eater) based on associated teeth material and similar to the pterosaurs known from Brazil of South America, with an estimated wingspan of 5 metres (16 ft). The specimen was later shown in the 2-hour National Geographic special program Sky Monsters (2006), which featured its discovery and life-size reconstruction attempt by Sereno's team. In his update entry of the 2000 Expedition of Niger, Sereno mentioned that his team found evidence of a large pterosaur specimen. In his 2000 interview, David Blackburn who participated in that expedition recounted the pterosaur partial wing discovery. He later discussed about the Elrhaz Formation pterosaur specimens in a 2002 conference abstract, stated to be the "only documented pterosaurian appendicular material from Africa", with the left humerus belonging to a tapejaroid and the partial wing belonging to an anhanguerid.

=== Aktisaurus ===
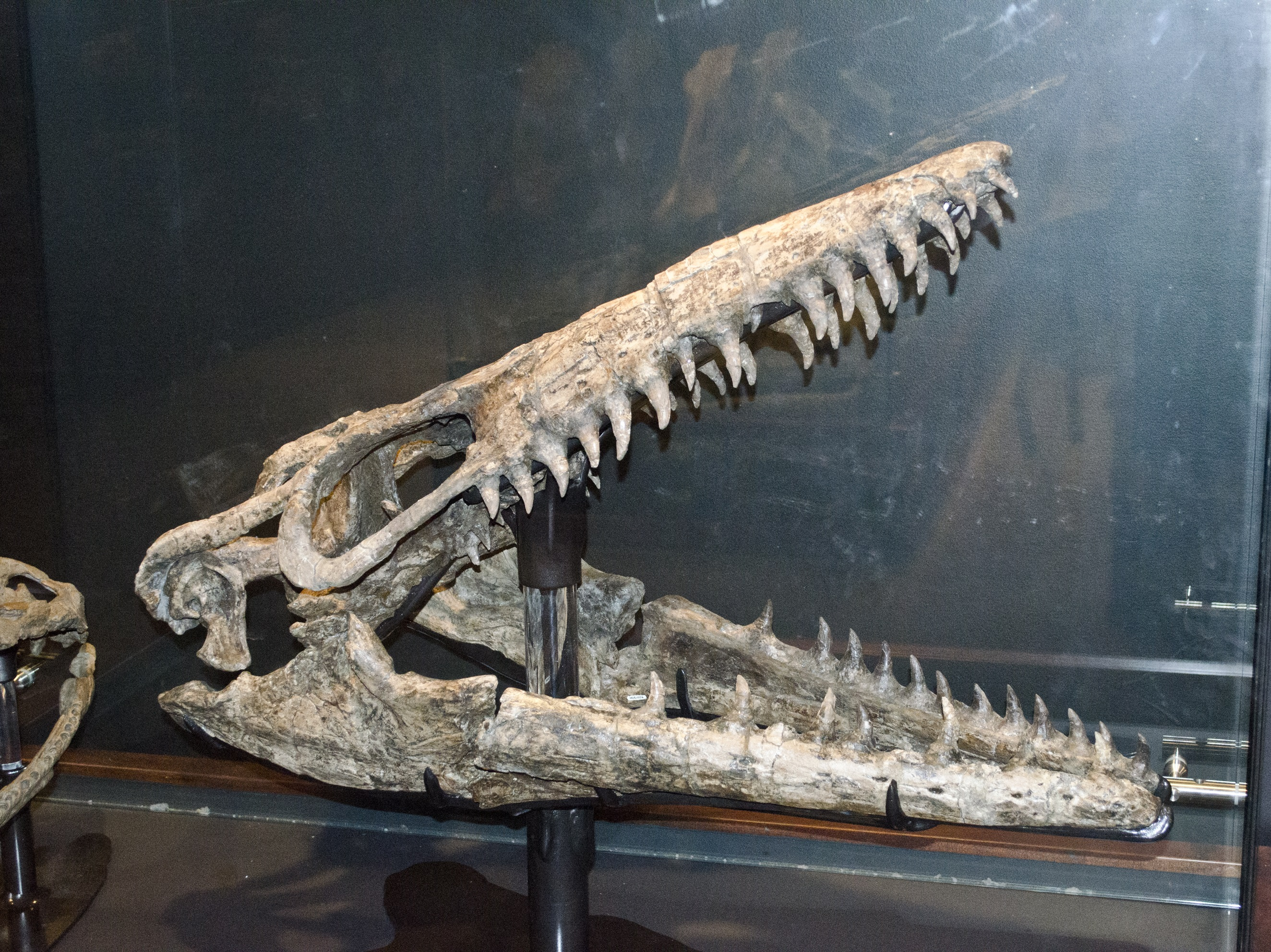
"Aktisaurus" skull

"Aktisaurus" (meaning coast or shoreline lizard) is a nomen ex dissertationae created by Hallie Pritchett Street in her PhD thesis as a new genus to contain the species originally named Mosasaurus conodon (specimen AMNH 1380), which has been of uncertain classification since its naming. The phylogenetic analysis of Street did not recover Mosasaurus as a monophyletic genus, and erected several new genera for species previously assigned to Mosasaurus. "Aktisaurus" was recovered as the sister taxon of Plotosaurus as demonstrated by the similar morphology of the carinae on their teeth.

=== Amblyrhynchosaurus ===
"Amblyrhynchosaurus wiffeni" (meaning blunt-snouted lizard) is a genus and species of nomen ex dissertationae named by Hallie Pritchett Street in her PhD thesis centered on the taxonomy of Mosasaurus. The designated type specimen is NZGS CD 535, which is a mostly complete mosasaurine skull that was discovered in the Maungataniwha Sandstone on the North Island of New Zealand. "Amblyrhynchosaurus" has similar skull morphology to the genus Prognathodon, but it was recovered as the sister taxon of Moanasaurus and a close relative of Mosasaurus. The species epithet is in honor of Joan Wiffen, although the precise spelling is uncertain. It is spelled both as "wiffeni" and "wiffenae" in the text of the thesis.

=== Antipodenectes ===
"Antipodenectes" (meaning swimmer from the other side of the world) is a nomen ex dissertationae erected by Hallie Pritchett Street in her PhD thesis to contain the species Mosasaurus mokoroa, which was named by S.P. Welles and D.R. Gregg in 1971. In her phylogenetic analysis, Street did not recover M. mokoroa as being within a monophyletic Mosasaurus genus, so named a new genus to contain this taxon. It was recovered as a close relative of Plotosaurus as well as "Aktisaurus". The type specimen is CM Zfr-1, which was discovered in the Conway Formation from the South Island of New Zealand.

=== Argochampsa microrhynchus ===
skull diagram of different Argochampsa specimens, including "A. microrhynchus"

A second species of the crocodylian genus Argochampsa, A. "microrhynchus", from the Paleocene beds of the Ouled Abdoun Basin was informally named on a 2018 thesis by Hannah Russell. Proportionally, it shows a much shorter and relatively wider snout than the type species, A. krebsi, with a lower number of maxillary teeth and more laterally-protuding alveoli providing the skull with a scalloped outline.

=== Aust Colossus ===
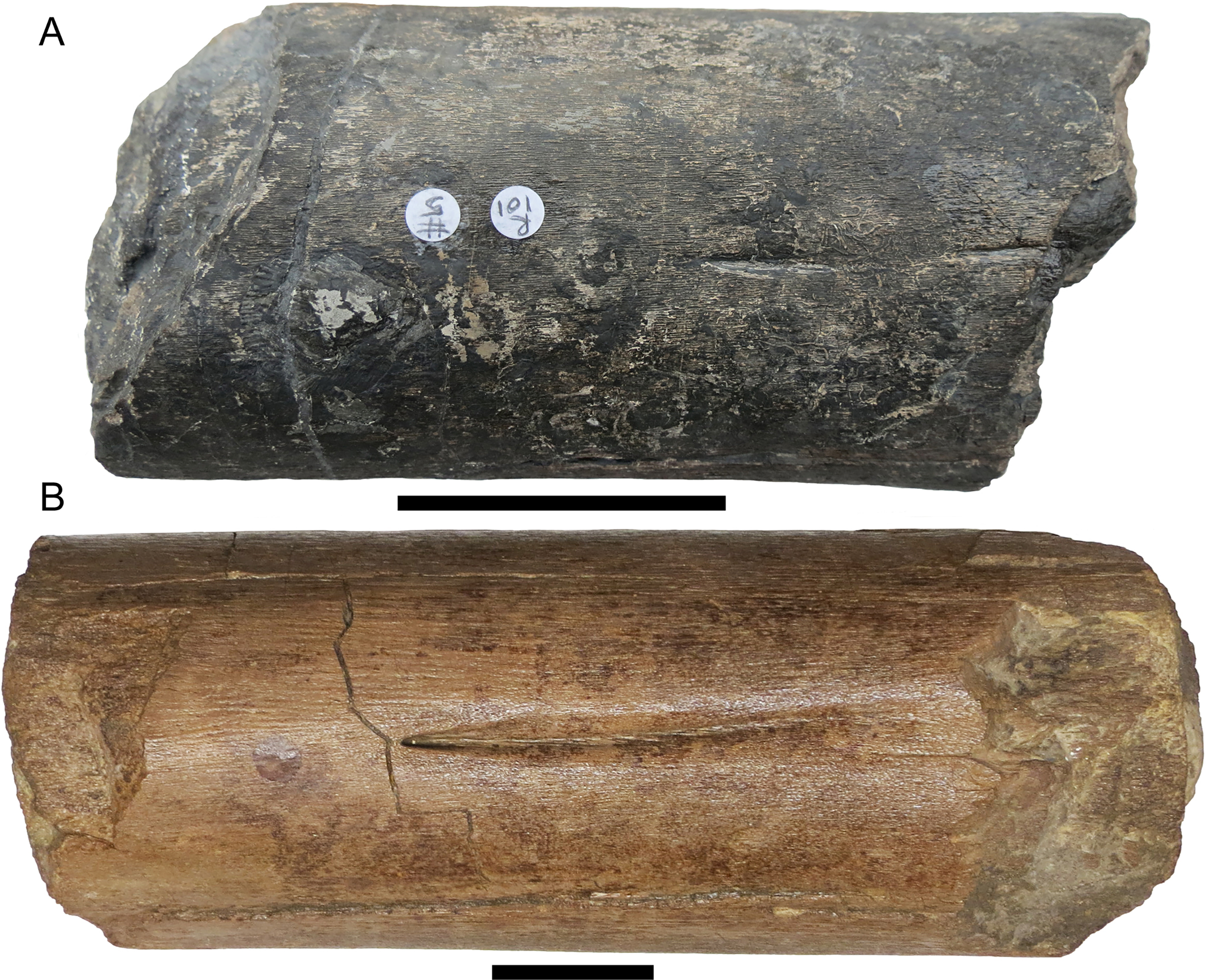
Surangular of Ichthyotitan (A) and "Aust Colossus" (B)

The "Aust Colossus" is an informal name given to the giant ichthyosaur specimens (BRSMG Cb3869, BRSMG Cb3870, BRSMG Cb4063 and BRSUG 7007) discovered from the Late Triassic (Rhaetian) Westbury Formation at the Aust Cliff. "Aust Colossus" has been tentatively estimated to be even larger than the 25 metres (82 ft) long ichthyosaur Ichthyotitan from the same formation, possibly over 30 metres (98 ft) long, though the authors acknowledge that this is a very speculative estimate.

== B ==
=== Batoremys ===
"Batoremys" is a genus of putative macrobaenid turtle from the Early Cretaceous of Mongolia. The intended type species "Batoremys leptis" was never given formal description, so it remains a nomen nudum.

== C ==
=== Camel turtle ===
The "camel turtle" is an informal nickname given to an un-described species of turtle, as it sports an unusual protruding ridge along the middle of its carapace, as well as due to its Moroccan origin.

=== Clidastes moorevillensis ===
Clidastes "moorevillensis" is an informal species of mosasaur from the Late Cretaceous Mooreville Chalk Formation of Alabama. First named in a 1975 thesis, it was never given formal description and lacks sufficient diagnostic characters that differentiate it from the dubious Clidastes liodontus.

=== Cuers ichthyosaur ===
The "Cuers ichthyosaur" is an informal name given to the giant ichthyosaur specimens (MHNTV PAL-1-10/2012 and MHNTV PAL-2/2010) discovered from the Late Triassic (Rhaetian) locality in Cuers, France. It is suggested to be similar to the Autun ichthyosaur specimens (Ichthyosaurus rheticus and Ichthyosaurus carinatus, both of which are nomen dubium) and Ichthyotitan.

=== Cystosaurus ===
"Cystosaurus" is a genus of putative teleosaur from France informally named by Étienne Geoffroy Saint-Hilaire in 1831. Because it was never given formal description, "Cystosaurus" remains a nomen nudum. Cryptodraco was used as an unnecessary replacement name for Cryptosaurus by Richard Lydekker (1889) who believed the name Cryptosaurus was already previously in use for "Cystosaurus".

== H ==
=== Hadongsuchus ===
"Hadongsuchus" (crocodile of Hadong County) is an Early Cretaceous (Aptian-Albian) crocodyliform from the Hasandong Formation of South Korea. Known from a 52 mm (2.0 in) long complete skull (KIGAM VP 200401) discovered in 2002, it was informally named as "Hadongsuchus acerdentis" in a 2005 thesis. Certain features of the third premaxillary tooth help distinguish it from other related crocodylomorphs. Like other protosuchians, it is believed to have been a fully terrestrial cursorial animal with a semi-erect posture. Lee (2005) suggested that "Hadongsuchus" and three other crocodyliforms (Shantungosuchus, Sichuanosuchus, and Zosuchus) comprise a new family which represents a sister taxa to the Protosuchidae, with Zosuchus being the closest relative.

=== Hainosaurus boubker ===
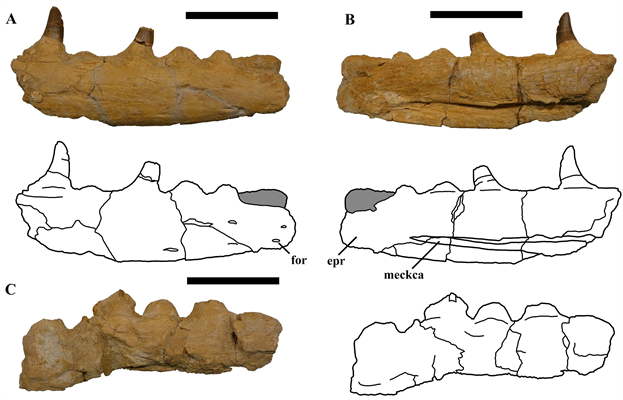
Dentary

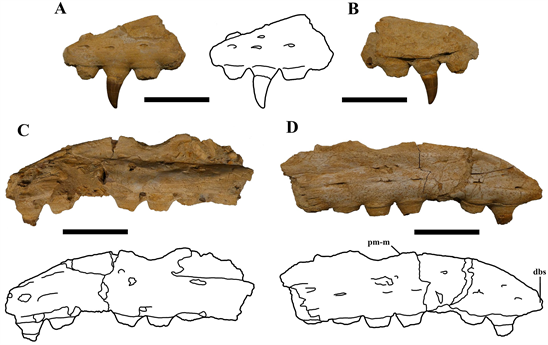
Maxilla

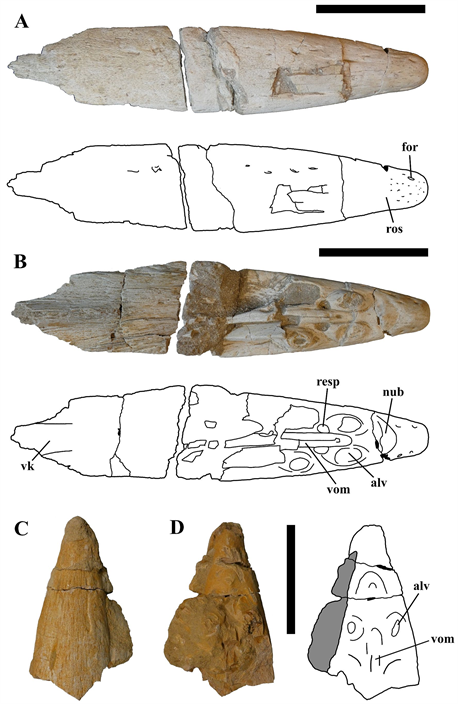
Premaxilla

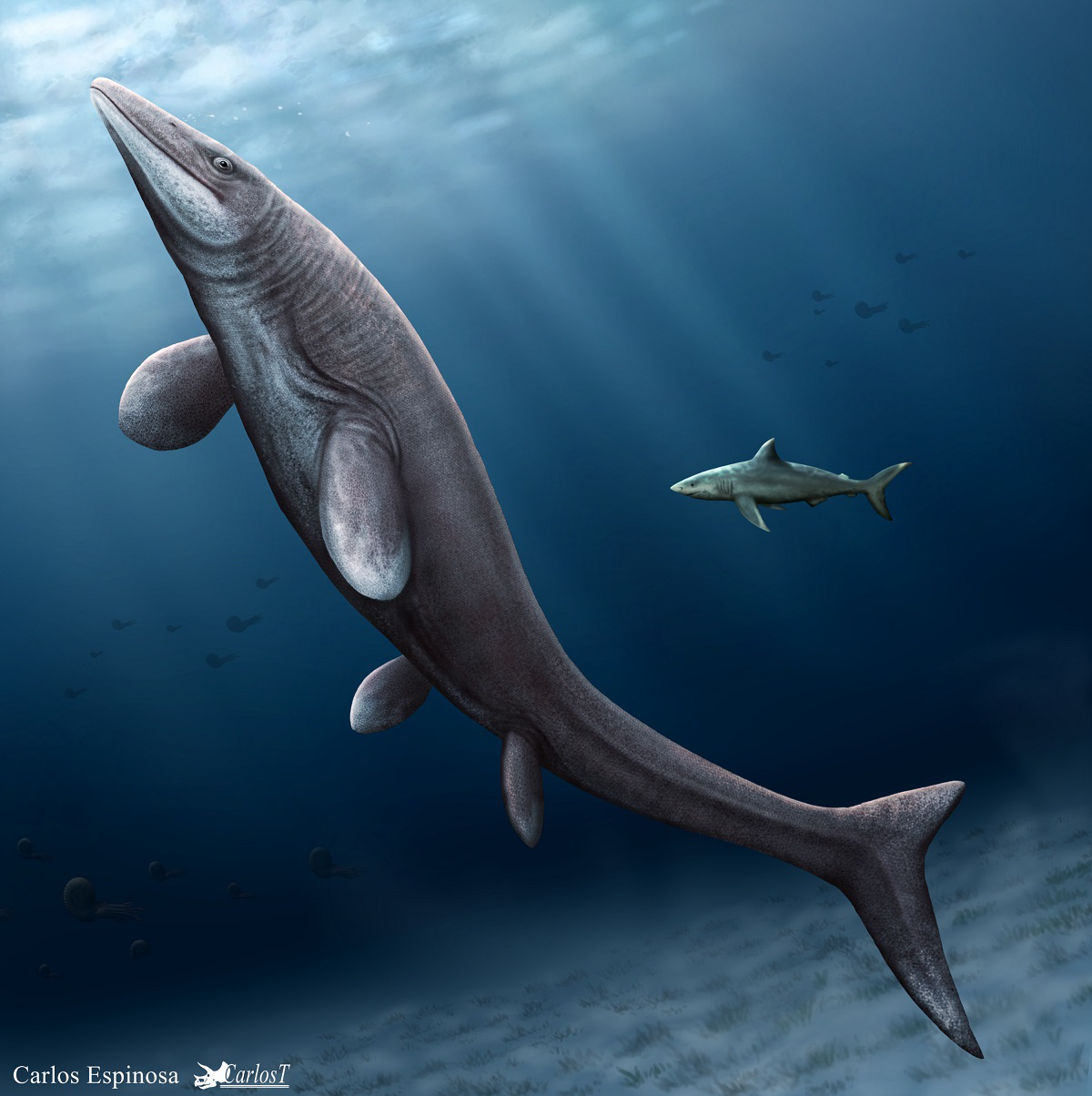
Hainosaurus "boubker" life restoration

Hainosaurus "boubker" is an informal species of mosasaur from the Sidi Chennane phosphate quarry in Morocco. The genus Hainosaurus is generally regarded as a synonym of Tylosaurus. In 2025, Bardet and colleagues tentatively recognized H. "boubker" as a valid member of the Tylosaurinae pending more complete specimens; it has been noted that, following ICZN recommendations, the specific name should have been "boubkeri", as it honors Mr. Boubker Chaibi, the discoverer of the specimen. The intended syntype was purportedly reposited in the "Paleontological Museum of the Vancouver Paleontological Society," but Zietlow et al. (2026) were unable to locate the specimen first hand due to the museum being non-existent, indicating that the initial description of this supposed taxon does not conform to ICZN article 72.10 and recommendation 16C; they further argued that the syntype of H. "boubker" is undiagnostic and cannot be distinguished from other tylosaurines, rendering its binomen as a dubious name.

=== Hitachinaka-ryu ===
"Hitachinaka-ryu" (ヒタチナカリュウ) is the nickname give to single bone of fossil reptile (INM-4-15300) from Campanian-Maastrichtian Nakaminato Group, Ibaraki Prefecture, Japan. It was originally identified as a right scapula of a pterosaur, but it is later re-identified as the right humerus of a trionychid turtle with estimated carapace length around 60–70 cm (24–28 in). It has been renamed as "Hitachinaka-oosuppon" in 2021.

=== Hobetsu-araki-ryu ===
"Hobetsu-araki-ryu", or "Hoppy" is the nickname given to an elasmosaurid plesiosaur (HMG 1) from early Campanian Yezo Group, Hokkaido, Japan. It is known from a considerable number of postcranial materials, although not enough to identify at lower taxonomic levels.

== I ==
=== Induszalim ===
"Induszalim" is an informal genus of crocodyliform named by M.S. Malkani based on fragmentary remains found in the Vitakri Formation of Pakistan in 2005. The proposed type species, "Induszalim bala", was named in a 2014 conference abstract, rendering this name a nomen nudum. A rostrum discovered around 2001 was referred to the theropod dinosaur "Vitakridrinda sulaimani" by Malkani (2006), but it was later referred to "Induszalim" by Malkani (2015a).

== K ==
=== Kaosaurus ===
"Kaosaurus" is an informal genus of turtle from Maastrichtian Mt Indamane (Mont In Daman) site in Niger. It is described in Michaut (2002), but it is not considered as valid under ICZN rules. Michaut described a species of Stratodus ("S. indamanensis") and smaller relative "Ministratodus" from same site, which are also doubtful.

=== Khuzdarcroco ===
"Khuzdarcroco" is an informal genus of purported mesoeucrocodylians proposed by M.S. Malkani in a 2015 conference abstract based on a rib fragment from the Goru Formation of Pakistan. The proposed type species is, "Khuzdarcroco zahri".

=== Kitadani goniopholidid ===
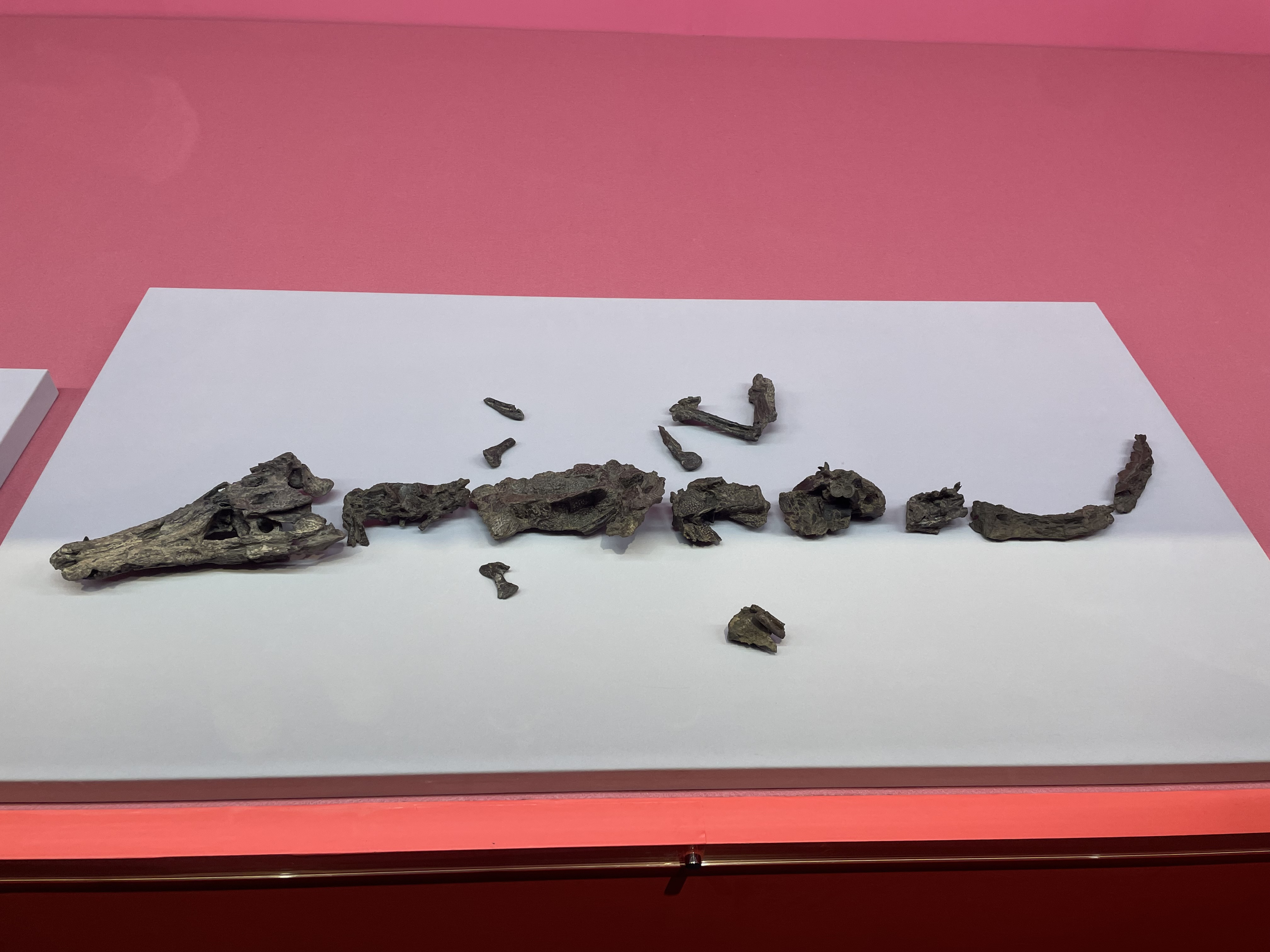
The Kitadani goniopholidid

The "Kitadani goniopholidid", also called as "Tetori-wani" (テトリワニ, "Tetori crocodile") is a goniopholidid crocodyliform known from Kitadani Formation of Japan. Nearly complete skeleton was discovered in 1982, which is the first vertebrate record from Kitadani Dinosaur Quarry. Partial materials described in 2024 are likely to belong to the same taxon.

== L ==
=== Likhoelesaurus ===
"Likhoelesaurus" (meaning "Li Khole lizard") is the name given to an as yet undescribed genus of archosauriform, either a dinosaur or rauisuchian, from the Late Triassic of what is now South Africa. The name was coined by Ellenberger in 1970, and the "type species" is "Likhoelesaurus ingens". It is named after the town in Lesotho where the fossils were found. The only fossils recovered have been teeth, from the late Carnian–early Norian-age Lower Elliot Formation. Ellenberger (1972) regarded the genus as a giant carnosaur, and Kitching and Raath (1984) treated it as possibly referable to Basutodon. Knoll listed "Likhoelesaurus" as a rauisuchian, also he noted that could also be a rauisuchian.

== M ==
=== Macysuchus ===
"Macysuchus" is an informal genus of phytosaur from the Late Triassic Cooper Canyon Formation, Texas, including single proposed species, "Macysuchus brevirostris". It is described in an unpublished thesis based on an articulated specimen including the skull and postcranial skeleton (TTUP 9425). This specimen is later referred to Redondasaurus gregorii by Spielmann and Lucas (2012).

=== Marichimaera ===
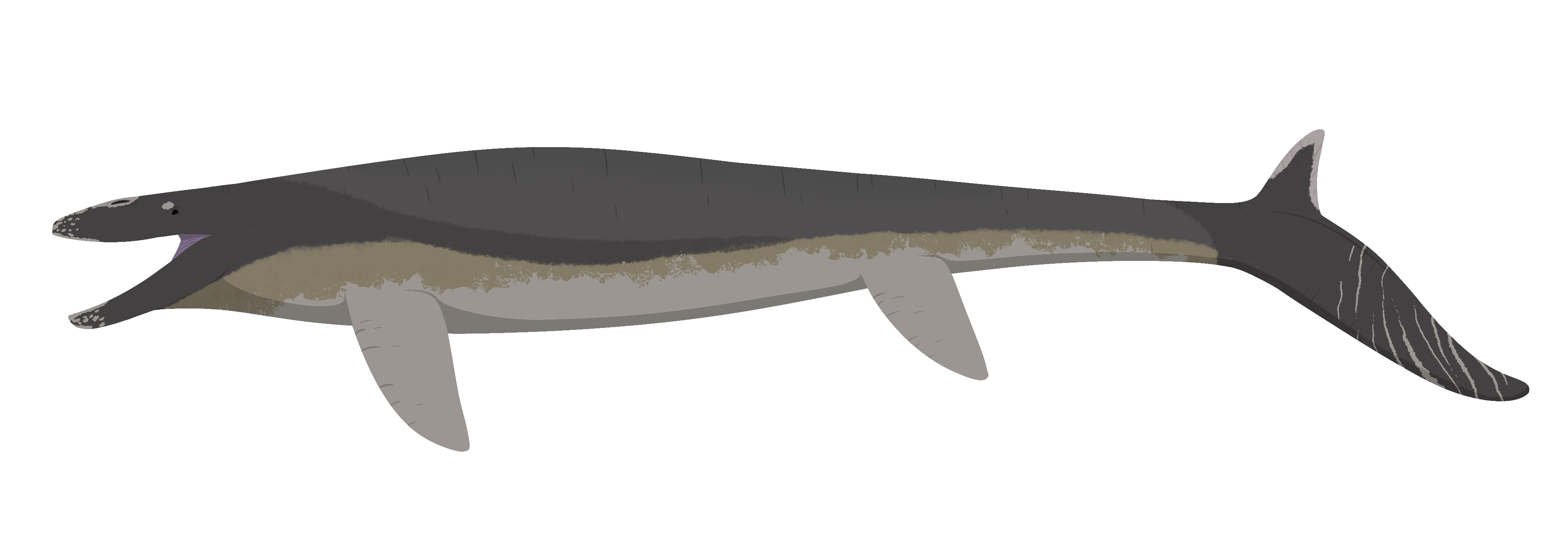
Restoration of "Marichimaera"

"Marichimaera waiparaensis" (meaning chimaera of the sea) is a nomen ex dissertationae created by Hallie Pritchett Street in their PhD thesis centered on the taxonomy of Mosasaurus. It was given this name because the type specimen (CM Zfr-108) apparently bore a mix of traits that were similar to the genera Mosasaurus and Prognathodon. This new genus was erected to contain the previously named species Prognathodon waiparaensis. In Street's phylogenetic analysis, "Marichimaera" was recovered as being just outside of Mosasaurini. The type specimen was discovered in the Ladimore Formation from the South Island of New Zealand.

=== Microbaena ===
"Microbaena" is an informal genus of macrobaenid turtle from the Cretaceous (Albian-Cenomanian) Blackleaf Formation. The intended type species, "Microbaena quadratosternon", is described in an unpublished thesis based on the complete specimen MOR 14891, first mentioned in a 2025 conference abstract. Microbaena is already preoccupied by a genus of moth named by Axel Hausmann in 1996.

=== Moanasaurus hobetsuensis ===
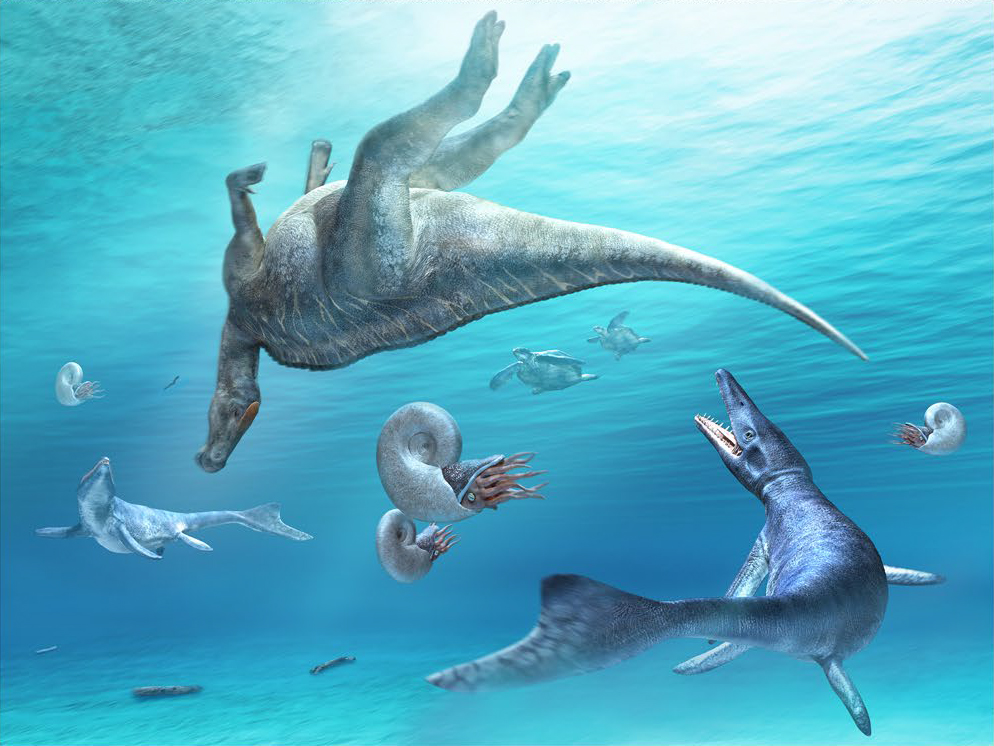
Two Moanasaurus "hobetsuensis" individuals swimming around a floating carcass of Kamuysaurus

Moanasaurus "hobetsuensis" is a nomen ex dissertationae created by Hallie Pritchett Street in her PhD thesis centered on the taxonomy of Mosasaurus. It is a combination of the existing genus Moanasaurus (which currently contains only one valid species, M. mangahouangae) and the previously named species Mosasaurus hobetsuensis, which was named in 1985. Street's phylogenetic analysis recovered this specimen (HMG 12) as being within the Moanasaurus genus but as being distinct from the type species by the saddle-shape of the glenoid condyle of the humerus and other features of the vertebrae and radius bone. The only known remains of M. "hobetsuensis" were discovered in the Hakobuchi Group on the island of Hokkaido in Japan.

=== Moanasaurus longirostris ===
Moanasaurus "longirostris" is a nomen ex dissertationae created by Hallie Pritchett Street in her PhD thesis centered on the taxonomy of Mosasaurus. The species was named as a new species of the existing genus Moanasaurus (which currently contains only one valid species, M. mangahouangae). The type specimen is IRSNB 3211, which was discovered in Belgium, although the exact locality is not named. M. "longirostris" differs from M. mangahouangae and M. "hobetsuensis" (section above) in the morphology of the zygapophyses and the quadrate bone.

=== Monster of Aramberri ===
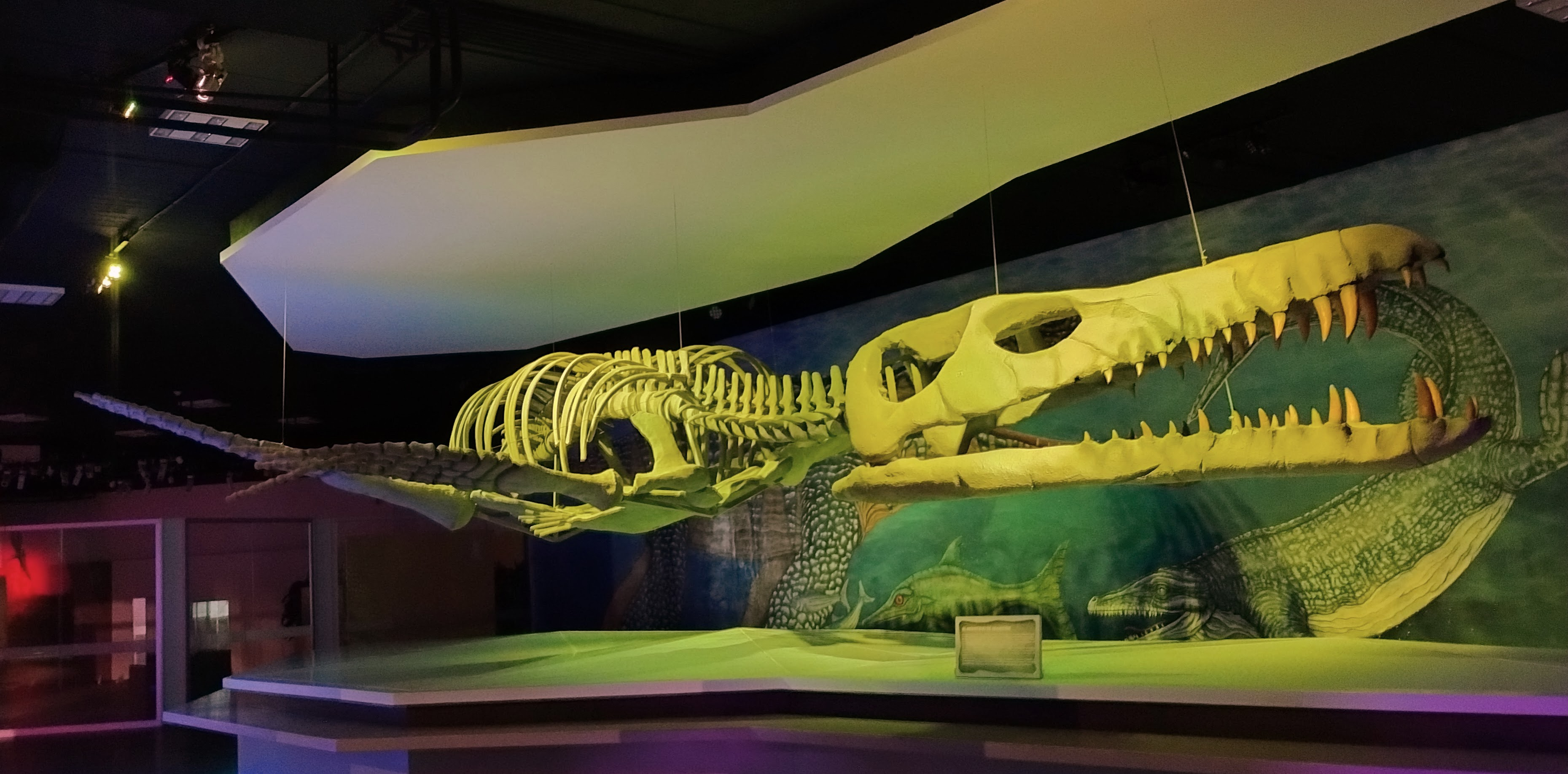
Reconstructed skeleton of the "Monster of Aramberri"

The "Monster of Aramberri", also known as the "Aramberri pliosaur", is an informal name given to a large pliosaur specimen (UANL-FCT-R2) discovered from the Late Jurassic (Kimmeridgian) La Caja Formation, Mexico. The body length of the "Aramberri pliosaur" is estimated around 10–11 metres (33–36 ft).

=== Mosasaurus glycys ===
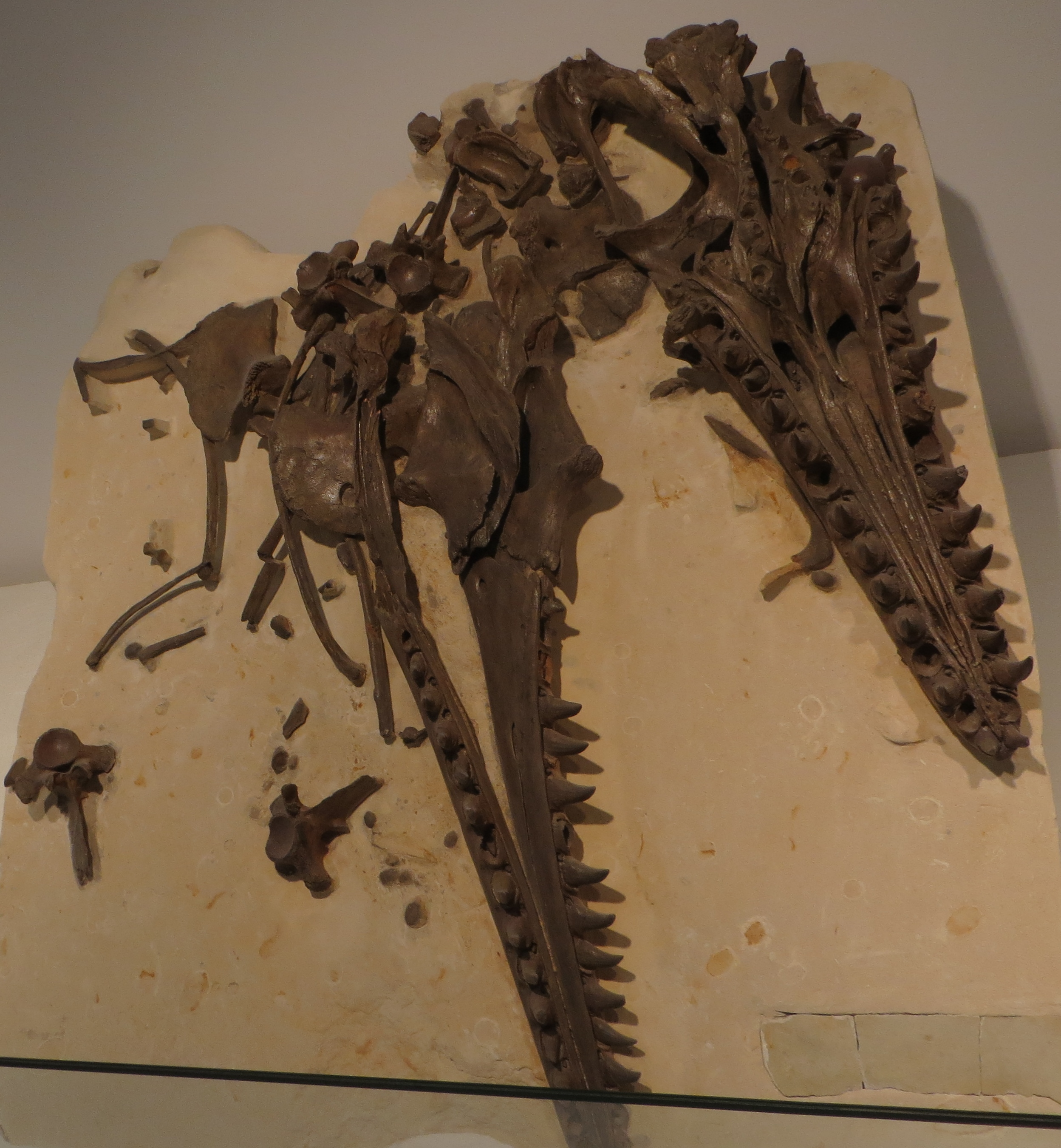
Mosasaurus "glycys" skull

Mosasaurus "glycys" is a nomen ex dissertationae created by Hallie Pritchett Street in her PhD thesis centered on the taxonomy of Mosasaurus. This new species was erected based on the specimen IRSNB R12, which was discovered in Belgium, although the precise locality from which it was discovered is not known. It was distinguished from all the existing species of Mosasaurus based on the presence of more teeth in all of the tooth-bearing bones (premaxillae, maxillae, dentaries, and pterygoids) than Mosasaurus hoffmannii but fewer pterygoid and maxillary teeth than Mosasaurus lemonnieri. It also possesses unique morphology of its jugal bone, unlike any other species of Mosasaurus. The species epithet "glycys" means "sweet", which is a reference to Belgium's reputation for chocolate production. The skull is similar in size to the holotype of Mosasaurus hoffmannii, measuring about 1 metre (3.3 ft) long, and it has been suggested that this specimen is a juvenile.

=== Mosasaurus poultneyi ===
Mosasaurus "poultneyi" is an informal species of mosasaur named in a 1953 thesis. The holotype specimen SDSM 452 was discovered in the Late Cretaceous Pierre Shale (Virgin Creek Member) of Brown County, South Dakota and consists of a fairly completed skeleton. While some researchers assigned the specimen into the previously named species Mosasaurus conodon, others considered it as represents an intermediate species of Mosasaurus.

== N ==
=== Nakagawa-kubinagaryu ===
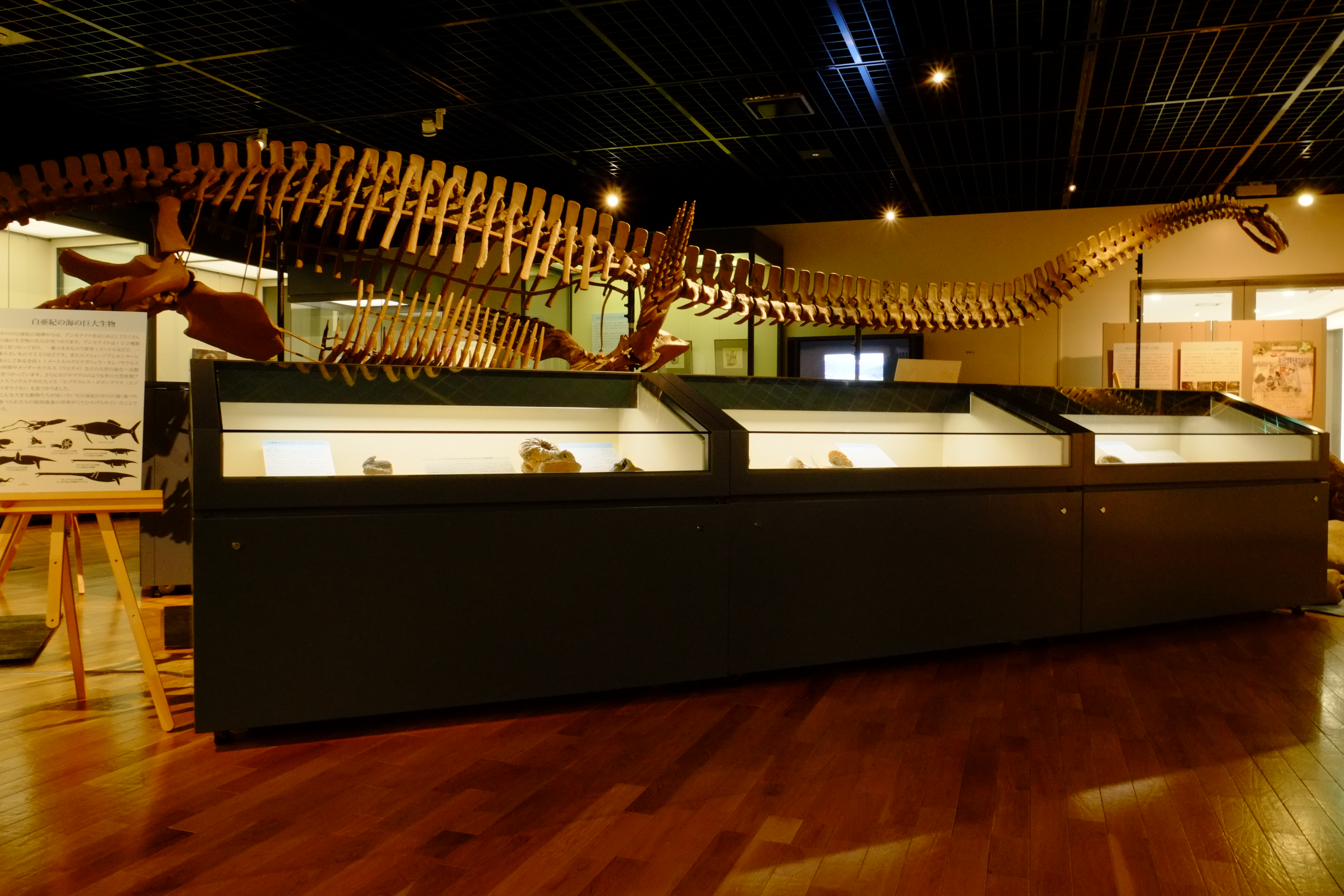
Reconstructed skeleton of Nakagawa-kubinagaryu

Nakagawa-kubinagaryu (ナカガワクビナガリュウ, "Nakagawa plesiosaur") is the nickname given to an elasmosaurid plesiosaur (NMV 2) from deposit of Maastrichtian Yezo Group in Nakagawa, Hokkaido. It is known from fragmentary skull and partial postcranial materials, which shares characters with Morenosaurus. Direct comparison with Futabasaurus is difficult due to poor preservation, though Futabasaurus does not have a massive humerus which is present in both Morenosaurus and NMV 2.

=== Narynsuchus ===
"Narynsuchus" is an extinct genus of goniopholidid. Because it has never been formally described, it is currently considered a nomen nudum. The name was first used in 1990 for fossil material found from a formation called the Balabansai Svita, which forms a lens in site FTA-30 of the Sarykamyshsai 1 locality in the Fergana Valley of Kyrgyzstan. The formation dates back to the Callovian stage of the Middle Jurassic. The known material of the intended type species "Narynsuchus ferganensis" consists of large and characteristically striated teeth as well as a robust left tibia. "Narynsuchus" is thought to have been larger than Sunosuchus, another crocodyliform from Sarykamyshsai 1, due to the greater size of the known elements belonging to the genus. This material was first recognized as belonging to a new crocodyliform in 1989, when it was referred to as an indeterminate species of Peipehsuchus.

== O ==
=== Oolithorhynchus ===
"Oolithorhynchus" is an informal genus of pterosaur based on numerous humeri referred to Rhamphocephalus from the Middle Jurassic (Bathonian) Eyford Member of the Fuller's Earth Formation. Because the paper proposing "Oolithorhynchus" was not formally published, this name is a nomen manuscriptum.

== P ==
=== Parirau ===
"Parirau" is an informal genus of pterosaur from the Late Cretaceous (Campanian-Maastrichtian) Maungataniwha Member of the Tahora Formation, New Zealand. The intended type species "Parirau ataroa" is named based on a single left ulna (NZMS CD 467) in a 2019 preprint, which renders this name a nomen nudum. Originally described as an indeterminate pterosaur with possible similarities to Santanadactylus in a 1988 paper, NZMS CD 467 is classified as an indeterminate azhdarchid in formal literature, contrary to the 2019 preprint which placed it within Lonchodectidae.

=== Phasmatosuchus decipulae ===
Skull diagram and size comparison of "Phasmatosuchus decipulae"

"Phasmatosuchus decipulae" is an informal genus of long-snouted crocodylian from the Thanetian age (Late Paleocene) Ouled Abdoun Basin of Morroco, named in a 2018 thesis by Hannah Russell. It is known from two partial skulls with broken anterior ends, although the available remains show it possessed an extremely elongated snout (of more than 85% of the total skull length) with laterally oriented teeth. It was suggested that it may have hunted fish with lateral swipes of the head, akin to a sawfish, as has been suggested for Euthecodon.

=== Platecarpus indamanensis ===
"Platecarpus indamanensis" is an informal species of genus Platecarpus from Maastrichtian Mt Indamane (Mont In Daman) site in Niger. It is described in Michaut (2013), as pre-publication thesis.

=== Platychelone ===
"Platychelone" is an informal genus of sea turtle from the Maastrichtian type area of Netherlands. Named by Louis Dollo in 1909, the intended type species "Platychelone emarginata" is considered a nomen nudum as the taxon was based on an undescribed, large carapace with no illustrations.

=== Pricesaurus ===
"Pricesaurus megalodon" ("Llewellyn Ivor Price lizard") is a nomen nudum based on remains currently assigned to Anhanguera. The remains were first brought up in a lecture by Rafael Gioia Martins-Neto in 1986. He notes several distinct features, but further research proved that all noted features are non-diagnostic and the taxon was ruled invalid due to improper naming conventions.

=== Procoelosaurus ===
"Procoelosaurus" is an informal genus of purported pterosauromorph from the Late Triassic Cooper Canyon Formation of Texas. Named in a 2002 thesis, the intended type species "Procoelosaurus brevicollis" was classified as an ornithodiran close to pterosaurs based on its hindlimb morphology. Other potential specimens identified as cf. "Procoelosaurus" were noted in a 2008 thesis. In 2012, this taxon was informally referred to as "procoelous vertebrate taxon A".

=== Pteromimus ===
"Pteromimus" is an informal genus of purported pterosauromorph from the Late Triassic Cooper Canyon Formation of Texas. Named in a 2002 thesis, the intended type species "Pteromimus longicollis" was classified as an ornithodiran close to pterosaurs based on its hindlimb morphology. A cervical vertebra identified as cf. "Pteromimus" was noted in a 2008 thesis. In 2012, this taxon was informally referred to as "procoelous vertebrate taxon B".

=== Pui azhdarchid ===
The "Pui azhdarchid" is an unnamed hatzegopterygian azhdarchid pterosaur from the Maastrichtian Pui locality of Romania, known from a single cervical vertebra (LPB R.2395). The vertebra indicates a medium-sized species, with an estimated wingspan of 3.5–4 metres (11–13 ft), closely related to Albadraco and Hatzegopteryx.

== R ==
=== Raptocleidus ===
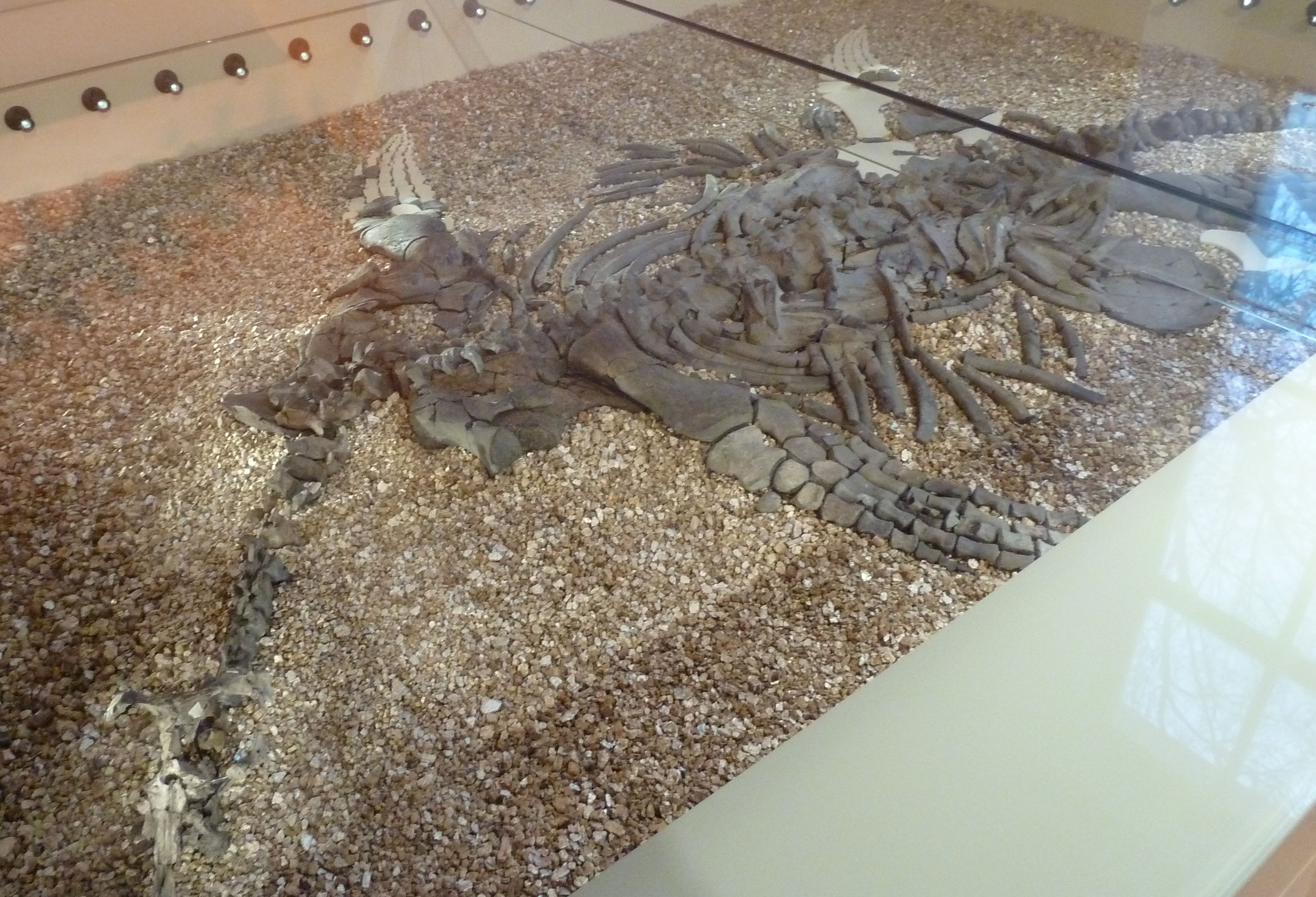
"Raptocleidus blakei", the "Blockley plesiosaur"

"Raptocleidus" is a plesiosaur from the Early Jurassic (Pliensbachian) deposits of Lyme Regis, southern United Kingdom. The genus contained two species, "Raptocleidus blakei" (LEICT G1.2002, one of the "Blockley plesiosaur" specimens) and "Raptocleidus bondi" (NHMUK R16330), both of which were informally named in a 2012 thesis. In the same thesis, the other two "Blockley plesiosaur" specimens (BHI 126445 and GLRCM specimen) and the other plesiosaur specimen from Dorset (BRSMG Ce17972a-o) are classified as "Raptocleidus" sp. It was likely a small plesiosaur, with an estimated body length of 3 metres (9.8 ft).

=== Rhamphodactylus ===
"Rhamphodactylus" is a nickname given to fossils of what is likely a basally-branching pterodactyloid from the Mörnsheim Formation by Oliver Rauhut in 2012. The name references the mosaic of features that seem to recall both Rhamphorhynchoidea and Pterodactyloidea. The preserved skull bones are especially similar to Pterodactylus, the tail is similar to rhamphorhynchoids but also Darwinopterus, the shoulder and arm bones are similar to Rhamphorhynchus, and the metacarpal is almost exactly intermediate the two major clades. While the fossil material has been recognized as likely belonging to a new taxon, a proper description has not been published. Some publications have used the nickname "Rhamphodactylus" in reference to this important fossil, even including it in phylogenetic analyses, which have recovered it as a basal pterodactyloid within Monofenestrata. A similar fossil, also with mosaic "transitional" features is known from the Painten Formation of Germany, which is now known as Propterodactylus.

=== Richmond pliosaur ===
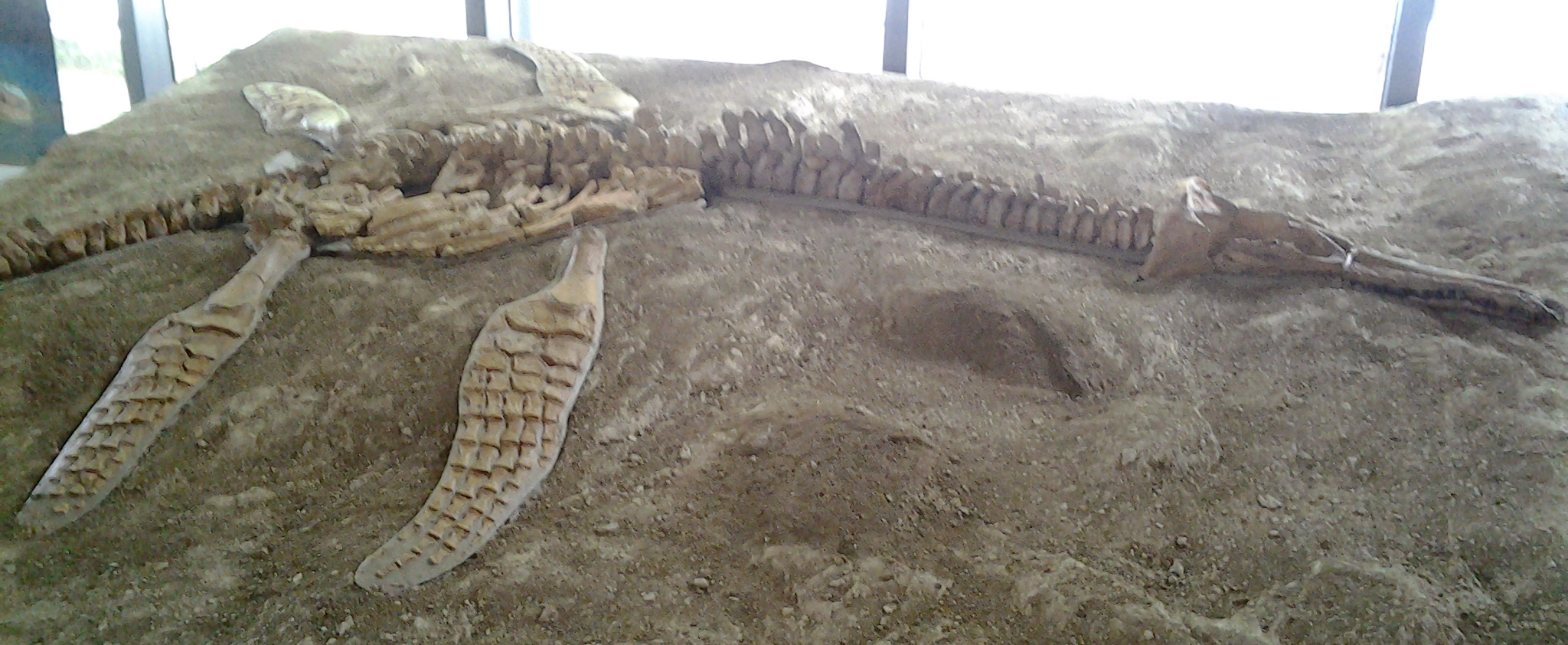
The Richmond pliosaur

The "Richmond pliosaur", also known as "Penny", is an informal name given to a complete polycotylid specimen (QM F18041) from the Early Cretaceous (Albian) Allaru Formation, Australia. Discovered in October 1989, this complete articulated specimen is measured around 5 metres (16 ft) long. Within the family Polycotylidae, it is classified as a member of the clade Occultonectia, which also includes Plesiopleurodon and Sulcusuchus.

== S ==
=== Satsuma-mukashi-umigame ===
"Satsuma-mukashi-umigame" (サツマムカシウミガメ, "Satsuma (old name of Kagoshima) ancient sea turtle" is the nickname given to presumed chelonioidean sea turtle from the Late Cretaceous (Cenomanian) Goshoura Group, Shishijima Island, Kagoshima Prefecture in Japan. Known from partial plastron and single cervical vertebra which shares characters with modern cheloniids, Corsochelys and Toxochelys, it is the oldest known marine turtle fossil from Japan. Carapace length is estimated to be around 70 cm (28 in) long.

=== Satsuma-utsunomiya-ryu ===
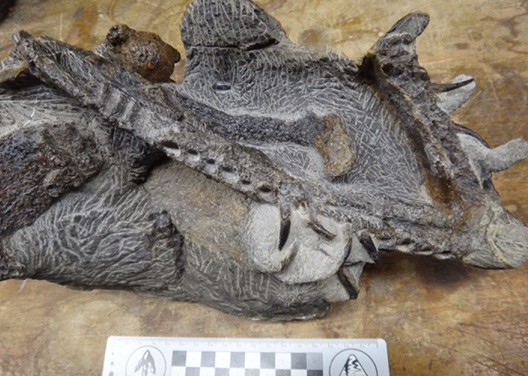
Mandible of "Satsuma-utsunomiya-ryu"

"Satsuma-utsunomiya-ryu" (サツマウツノミヤリュウ) is the nickname given to an elasmosaurid plesiosaur from the Late Cretaceous (Cenomanian) Goshoura Group, Shishijima Island, Kagoshima Prefecture in Japan. It is the oldest known elasmosaurid from East Asia, dating back to approximately 100 million years ago. The known material includes the mandible, hyoid, fragments of the skull, 40 cervical vertebrae, and a limb bone, possibly belonging to a juvenile individual. Features of the tooth surface ornamentation cervical vertebrae, suggest Satsuma-unomiya-ryu may represent a new species. The name references the former province name of the discovery site and the discoverer, Satoshi Utsunomiya. In 2021, Ustunomiya and Yasuhisa Nakajima reported the presence of a regurgitated "pellet" around its throat region.

=== Satsuma-yokuryu ===
"Satsuma-yokuryu" (薩摩翼竜, "Satsuma pterosaur") is a nickname given to fossil of partial limb bone of pterosaur described from the Late Cretaceous (Cenomanian) Goshoura Group, Shishijima Island, Kagoshima Prefecture in Japan. This specimen was first discovered by Satoshi Utsunomiya during a TV program, he and Yasuhisa Nakajima analyzed material and found to be a part of limb bone. Its wingspan would be around 4 meters (13 ft).

=== Scientrysuchus ===
"Scientrysuchus" is an informal genus of goniopholidid crocodyliform based on the specimen DNSM-NPA-1732 from the Nakdong Formation of South Korea. The specimen and its speculative life restoration is currently housed in the Daegu National Science Museum.

=== Sinuiju pterosaur ===
The "Sinuiju pterosaur" is an informal name given to the anurognathid pterosaur specimen (CKGP 19960828, formerly PS198922) discovered from the Sinuiju Formation of North Korea. This specimen has been tentatively assigned to Jeholopterus cf. ningchengensis, and another pterosaur specimen (PS199921) is also known from the same formation.

=== Speeton Clay plesiosaurian ===
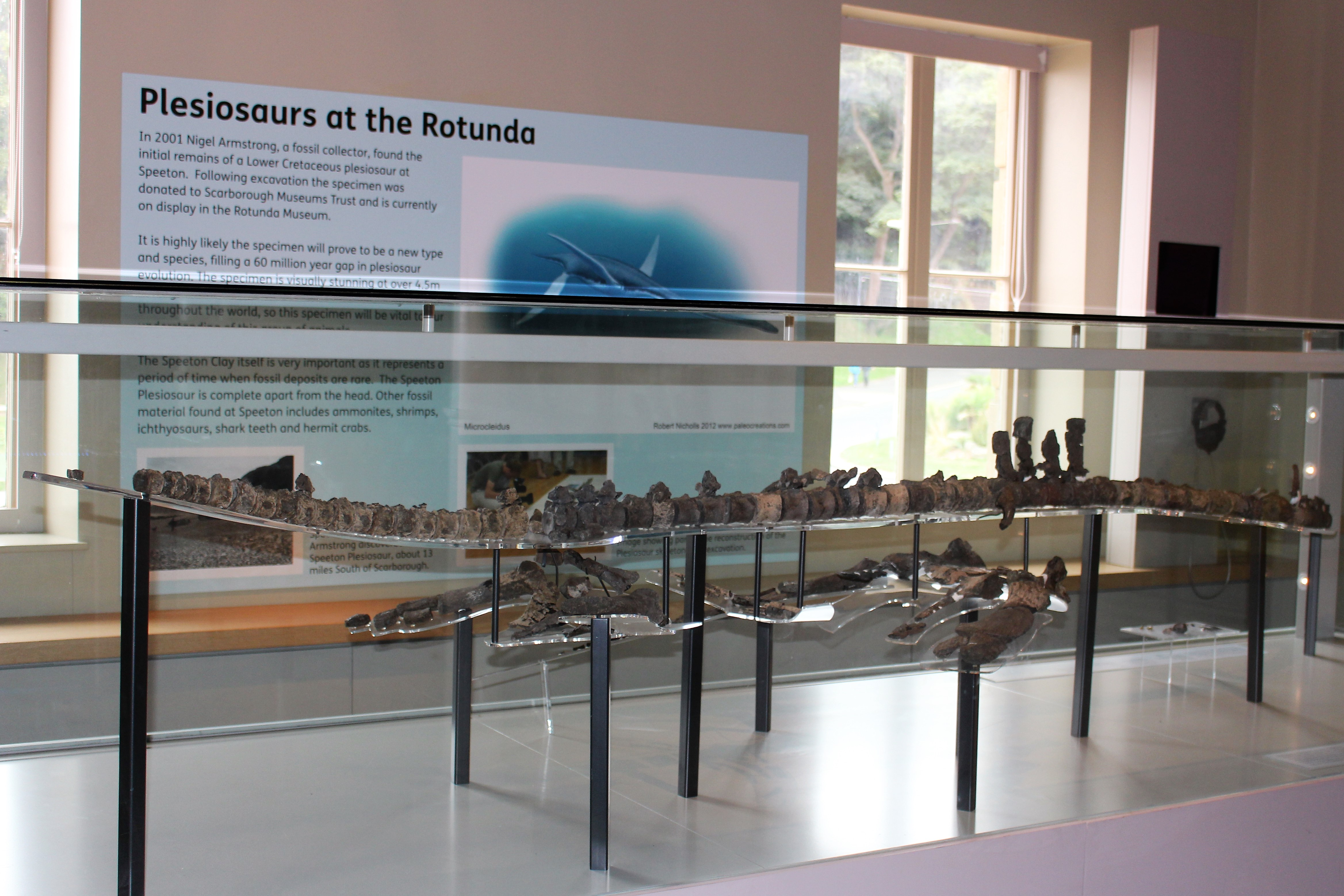
The Speeton Clay plesiosaurian

The "Speeton Clay plesiosaurian" is an informal name given to the elasmosaurid plesiosaur specimens (NHMUK PV R8623 and SCARB 200751) from the Early Cretaceous (Hauterivian) Speeton Clay Formation of northern England.

=== Steneosaurus barettoni ===
"Steneosaurus barettoni", also known as "Barettoni's metriorhynchid", is an informal name given to the metriorhynchid mandible specimen (MGP-PD 26552) from the Late Jurassic (possibly Oxfordian) of northern Italy. Estimated around 3.7 metres (12 ft) in total body length, Andrea Cau tentatively referred this specimen to Neptunidraco, but other researchers argued that it likely belongs to a separate, indeterminate metriorhynchid.

=== Stereosaurus ===
"Stereosaurus" is an informal genus of plesiosaur from the Late Cretaceous (Cenomanian) Cambridge Greensand. The genus contains three species, "Stereosaurus platyomus", "S. cratynotus" and "S. stenomus", all of which were informally coined in 1869 by British paleontologist Harry Seeley, who considered them to be plesiosaurian.

=== Sulaimanisuchus ===
"Sulaimanisuchus" is an informal genus of purported mesoeucrocodylians from the Cretaceous Vitakri Formation of Pakistan, mentioned by M. Sadiq Malkani in 2010. The proposed holotype is a partial mandibular symphysis. The intended type species is "Sulaimanisuchus kinwai."

== T ==
=== Tous pterosaur ===
The "Tous pterosaur" is an unnamed species of azhdarchid from the Maastrichtian Sierra Perenchiza Formation of Valencia, Spain. It is known from fragments of mid-cervical vertebrae that resemble those of Azhdarcho and Quetzalcoatlus.

=== Tylosaurus borealis ===
Tylosaurus "borealis" is an informal species of mosasaur, with the known specimen discovered from approximately 55 kilometers (34 mi) northeast of Grande Prairie. It was named in a 2020 thesis by Samuel Garvey who described a partial skull of Tylosaurus catalogued as TMP 2014.011.0001, which makes the specimen the northernmost known occurrence of this genus.

== U ==
=== Umikosaurus ===
"Umikosaurus" (meaning lizard child of the sea) is a nomen ex dissertationae created by Hallie Pritchett Street in her PhD thesis centered on the taxonomy of Mosasaurus. It was named to contain the existing species Mosasaurus prismaticus, which was named by K. Sakurari and colleagues in 1999. Street's phylogenetic analysis did not recover M. prismaticus within a monophyletic Mosasaurus genus, but rather found that "Umikosaurus" was a close relative of Plotosaurus and Mosasaurus conodon (which they renamed "Aktisaurus conodon"), which is reflected in the morphology of the carinae on its teeth. The type specimen, HMG 1065, was discovered in the Hakobuchi Group on the island of Hokkaido in Japan.

== W ==
=== Wadanaang ===
"Wadanaang" is an informal genus of madtsoiid snake named by M.S. Malkani (2021) in Scientific Research Publishing, a known predatory publisher. The known material of the intended type species "Wadanaang kohsulaimani" consists of fragmentary teeth and vertebra from the Vitakri Formation of Pakistan.

=== Wyomingopteryx ===
The name "Wyomingopteryx" appears in a painting of Morrison prehistoric animals by Robert Bakker. However, this binomen is a nomen nudum, and it is possible that Bakker may have intended to coin "Wyomingopteryx" for the Istiodactylus-like specimen TATE 5999 because that specimen is found in Wyoming.

== See also ==
- List of informally named dinosaurs
