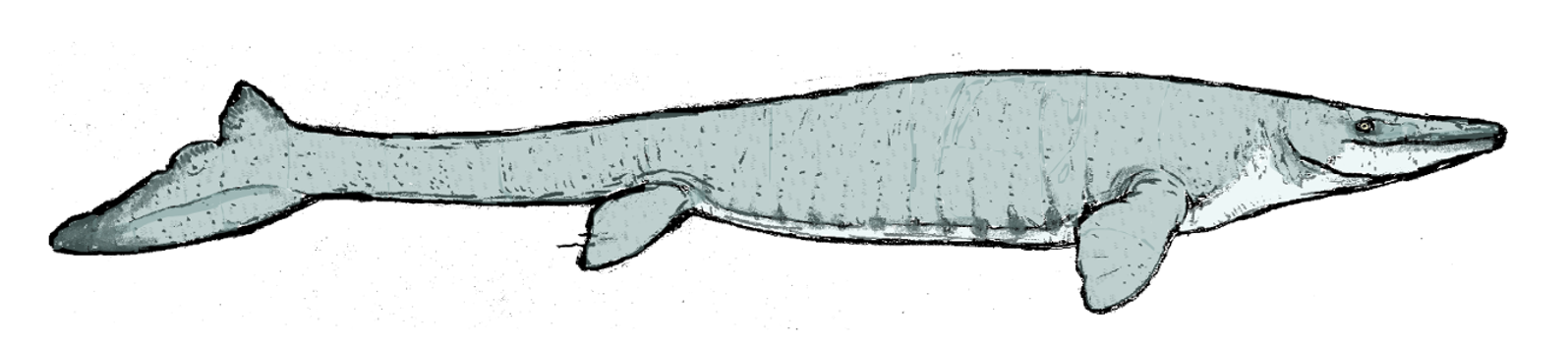
- Life restoration

Scientific classification
- Kingdom: Animalia
- Phylum: Chordata
- Class: Reptilia
- Order: Squamata
- Clade: †Mosasauria
- Family: †Mosasauridae
- Tribe: †Mosasaurini
- Genus: †Moanasaurus; Wiffen, 1980

Species
- Moanasaurus mangahouangae (type) Wiffen, 1980

Synonyms
- Rikisaurus tehoensis Wiffen, 1990; Mosasaurus flemingi? Wiffen, 1990

= Moanasaurus =

Moanasaurus Temporal range: Late Cretaceous, 77–66 Ma

Extinct genus of lizards

Moanasaurus (From Māori moana "sea" and Greek sauros "lizard"; meaning "Sea Lizard") was a genus of mosasaur from the Late Cretaceous period. Its fossil remains have been discovered in the North Island of New Zealand. Moanasaurus was a very large mosasaurine known originally from holotype CD43, a disarticulated skull, vertebrae, ribs and flipper bones. The skull measures 78 cm (31 in) in length, which shows that Moanasaurus was one of the largest in the subfamily of Mosasaurinae. Researchers argue that some Antarctic Mosasaurus remains (including a "large, fragmentary skull") may be attributed to this genus.

Two additional species have been named, "Moanasaurus hobetsuensis" (originally named Mosasaurus hobetsuensis) from Japan and "Moanasaurus longirostris" from Belgium, but these are nomina nuda because they were named in a PhD thesis. The same thesis argued that Mosasaurus flemingi is a junior synonym of Moanasaurus mangahouangae.

== See also ==
- List of dinosaurs and other Mesozoic reptiles of New Zealand
