= Kawai Michi =

Japanese educator

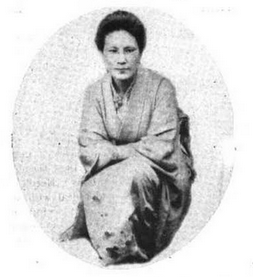
Michi Kawai, in a 1919 publication of the YWCA.

Kawai Michi (河井 道; July 29, 1877 – February 11, 1953) was a Japanese educator, Christian activist, and proponent of Japanese-Western ties before, during, and after World War II. She served as the first Japanese National Secretary of the YWCA of Japan and founded Keisen University.

== Early life ==
Kawai was born on July 29, 1877, in Yamada City in the Province of Ise, to Kawai Noriyasu, a Shinto priest, and Shimosato Kikue, the daughter of the village master of Makkido. When Kawai was still a child, her father lost his job and chose to move his family to Hakodate, in Hokkaido, where the government was encouraging people to settle. There, in 1887, she began attending a newly established boarding school in Sapporo, run by a Presbyterian missionary named Sarah C. Smith. Originally known as Smith Girls' School, the school was later renamed Hokusei Jogakko, or North Star Girls’ School. (In 1951, the school became Hokusei Gakuen Women's Junior College, and in 1962 Hokusei Gakuen University was founded.)

At Miss Smith's school, Kawai began learning Japanese composition and writing, arithmetic, and English. Other subjects, such as botany, Japanese literature, zoology, the Chinese classics, and algebra and geometry were added in time. Some classes were taught by professors from Sapporo Agricultural College (later to become Hokkaido University), such as Nitobe Inazō.

In 1895, shortly before turning 18, Kawai spent a year helping to start up another girls' school in northern Hokkaido, experience that would prove useful later in her life.

== Study in the United States ==
Upon her return to Hokusei Jogakko, Nitobe Inazō encouraged Kawai to travel to the United States to study. She first spent time in Tokyo studying with Tsuda Umeko and was awarded a scholarship from an American committee which Tsuda had founded in Philadelphia. Kawai moved to the United States at the age of 21 and enrolled in an American preparatory school. She entered Bryn Mawr College in Pennsylvania 1900, graduating in 1904.

While in the United States, Kawai became involved with the Young Women’s Christian Association (YWCA) which worked to better women's lives through the promotion of social and economic change. In particular, she attended a YWCA Conference in New York State during the summer of 1902. There she met a Canadian woman named Caroline Macdonald, who would later be sent to Japan by the World's Committee of the YWCA in order to help establish a Japanese National YWCA Association.

== Return to Japan ==
After graduation she returned to Japan, teaching at Tsuda Ume's girls' school Joshi Eigaku Juku (Women’s English School), which would later become Tsuda College. There she taught English, translation, and history. She also became one of the founding members of the Japanese YWCA along with Caroline Macdonald, who had arrived in Japan in 1905. Kawai would become the first National Secretary (a position also referred to as the General Secretary), of the Japanese YWCA in 1912, a position she would hold until 1926.

In 1916, Kawai chose to turn her attention full-time to the YWCA, giving up teaching. She worked to expand the National Association and create local city-level YWCA associations throughout Japan as well as travelled internationally to global meetings of the YWCA where she often spoke on behalf of the Japanese Association. Following the 1923 Great Kantō earthquake, Kawai also served as the first chairman of the Federation of Tokyo Women's Associations, which played a significant role in organizing the post-earthquake relief efforts.

== Foundation of Keisen University ==
In 1929, Kawai founded a Christian school for young women in Tokyo. She named this school Keisen Jogaku-en (Fountain-of-blessings Girls’ Learning-garden). While initially situated in a rental house in Tokyo, and enrolling nine girls in 1929, its first school year, the school soon outgrew its location. By 1931 the school had its own grounds and 60 students and it continued to grow. In its first years, the school taught Japanese, Mathematics, History and Geography, Science, English, Japanese sewing, Singing and Games, Drawing, Bible and Morals, International Study, and Gardening. Out of this school grew the modern Keisen University, which was founded in Tama, Tokyo in 1988.

== Continuing Cultural Outreach ==
Simultaneously continuing her work as a Japanese Christian, in 1934 Kawai published Japanese Women Speak: A Message from the Christian Women of Japan to the Christian Women of America, a book requested by the United Study of Foreign Missions, a Christian outreach organization. That same year, Kawai travelled to the United States on a sponsored speaking tour promoting Japanese-American relations.

In 1941 Kawai attended a meeting of the Foreign Mission Boards of North America and Canada, representing Japanese Christian women. While in California, Kawai was awarded an honorary degree of Doctor of Humane Science from Mills College in California. In her biography, Michi wrote, “‘This is a gesture of American goodwill to Japan at this critical moment,’ said my soul to me, ‘therefore accept the honor, not for yourself, but for your country, and pledge yourself to stand for the cause of peace and friendship in this hour of tribulation.’"
