= Keisen University =

Private women's college in Tokyo, Japan

Keisen university
- 恵泉女学園大学
- Type: Private
- Established: 1988
- Officer in charge: Masami Ohinata
- Students: 1,188
- Location: Tama, Tokyo, Japan
- Campus: Urban
- Website: www.keisen.ac.jp

Keisen University (恵泉女学園大学, Keisen jogakuen daigaku) is a private women's college in Tama, Tokyo, Japan, established in 1988. The university is linked to the Keisen School for Young Women, founded in 1929 by Michi Kawai, the National Secretary of the Young Women's Christian Associations of Japan. In March 2023, the University announced that it would close once students admitted in 2023 had graduated. The University will not seek new admissions in the 2024 academic year.

== Philosophy ==
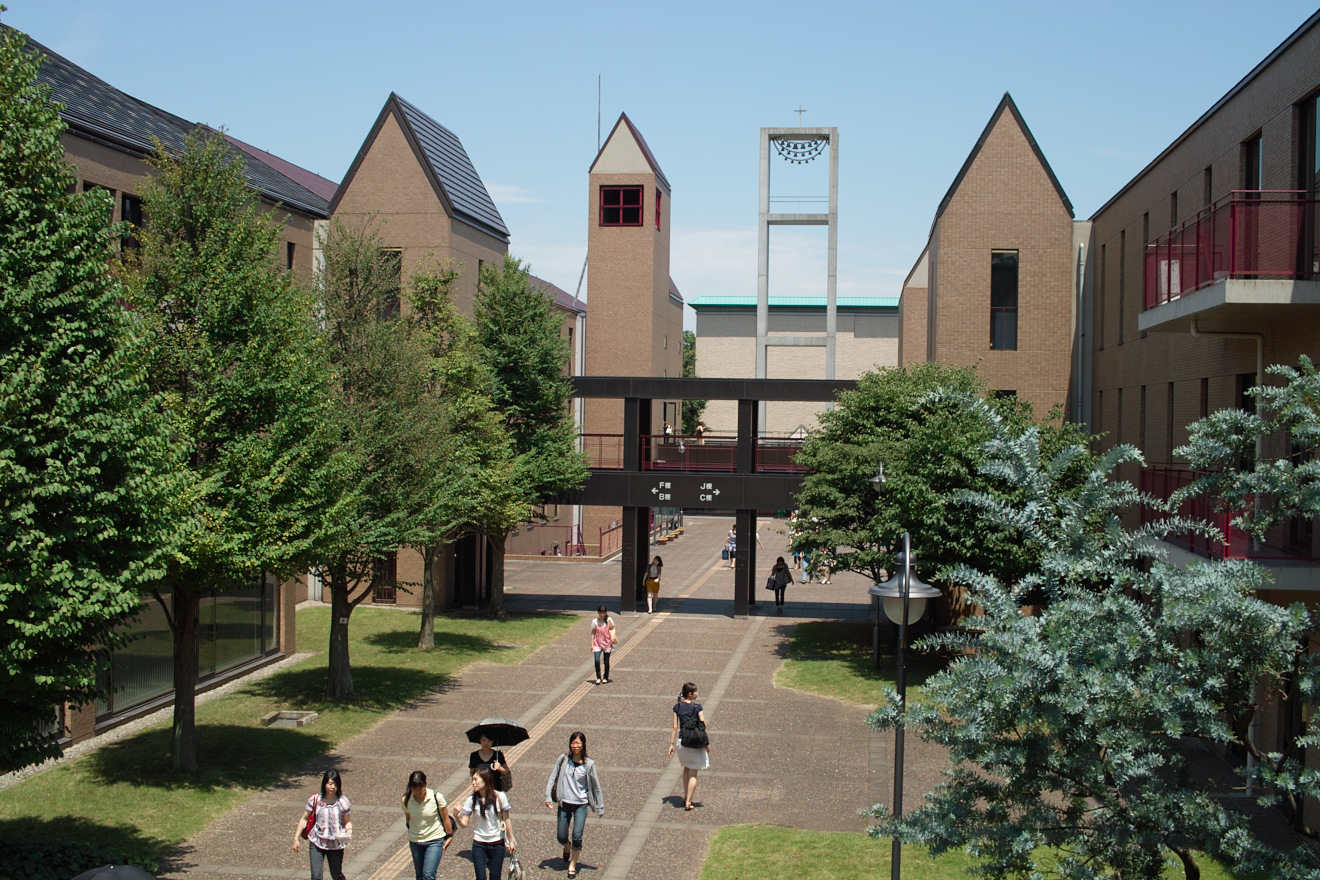
Keisen University

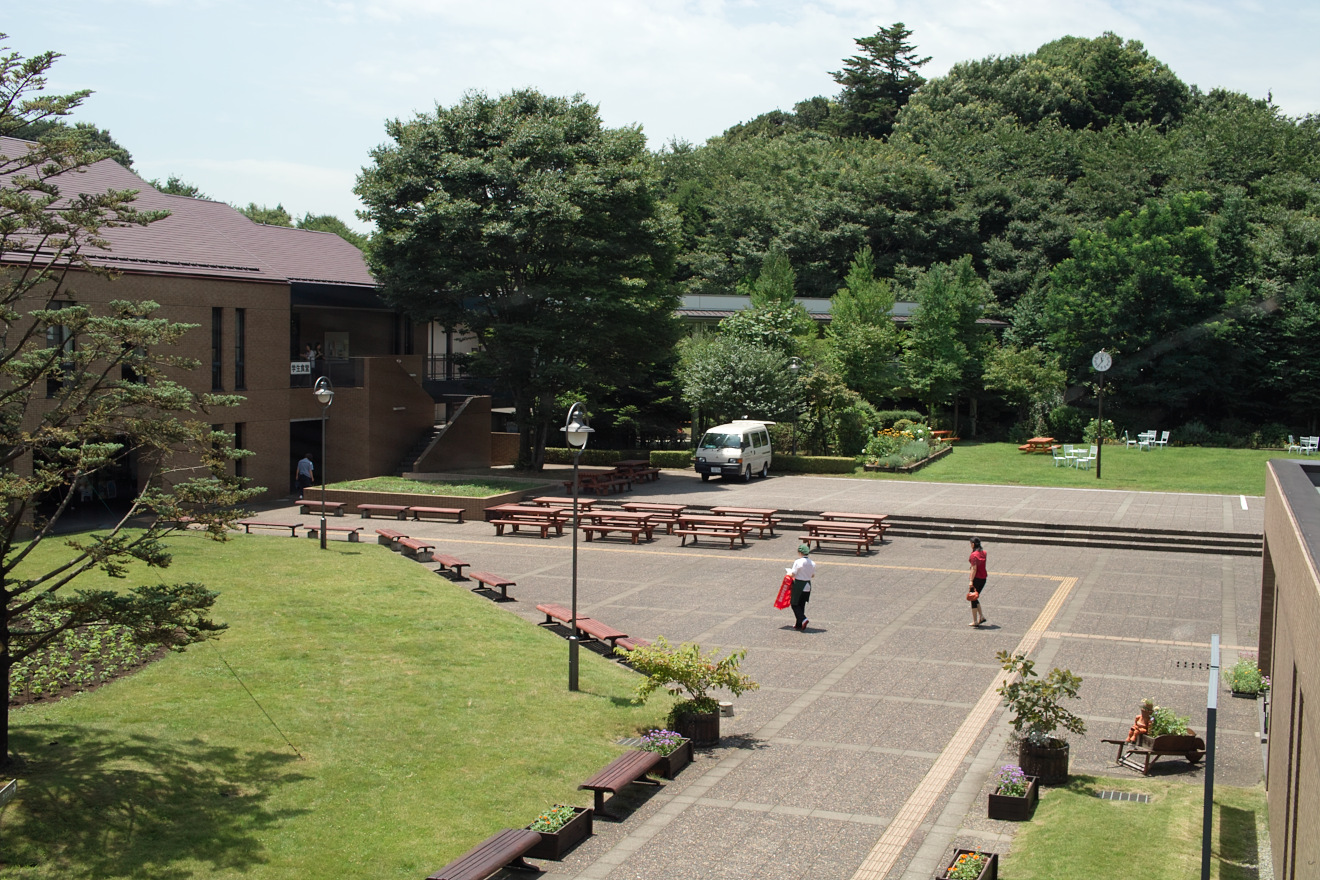
Keisen Campus

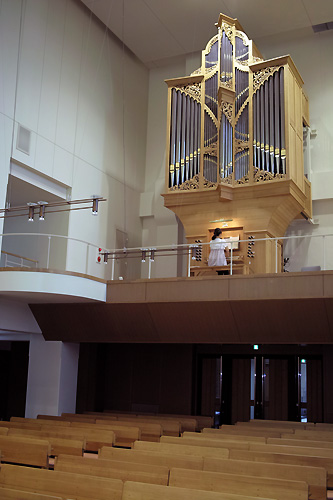
The Organ and Chapel

Keisen University follows an educational philosophy based on the following three sets of values:

- Christianity:
  Respect for human's individualities and attention to other person without discrimination of race and class.
- International Peace Studies:
  Improve Japanese women's knowledge of the world, get rid of prejudice and face problems.
- Horticulture:
  The love of nature, the respect for all the living things and the learning of the basic morals.

== Faculties and Departments ==
=== Faculty of Humanities ===
- Department of Japanese Language and Culture
- Department of English Communication

=== Faculty of Human and Social Studies ===
- Department of International Social Studies
- Department of Psychology and Horticulture

=== Graduate school ===
- Graduate School of Humanities-Division of Cultural Coexistence

This division's main focus is on Japanese-Language education and multicultural coexistence studies. Study programmes include Japanese language teaching and education, gender and culture studies, minority and culture studies and multicultural communication.

- Graduate School of Human and Social Studies-Division of Peace Studies

== Facilities ==
=== Chapel ===
The chapel offers regular services, as well as music of pipe organ. There is a Christian center under the chapel. Sometimes, they have some chapel concerts for students and the local community.

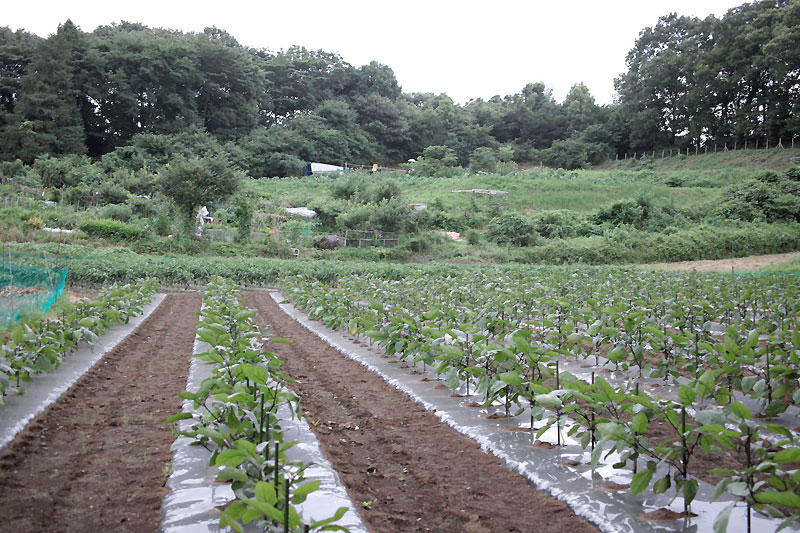
Educational Farm for Horticulture

=== Educational Farm ===
There is a large farm called "Farm for education" where various vegetables and flowers are cultivated. All first year "Freshman" students take a compulsory horticulture class, where they learn to grow vegetables and flowers.

=== Herb Garden ===
There are many kinds of herbs. Students can pick herbs and sometimes drink herbal teas. The herb garden is also a popular spot where students can eat lunch.

== International links ==
In addition to 'study-abroad' programs in California, Thailand, England and Australia, Keisen University has educational links with the following institutions:

- North Western College (Iowa, USA)
- Silla University (Busan, Korea)
- Payap University (Chiang Mai, Thailand)

== Notable alumni and teachers ==
- Michi Kawai, founder.
- Noyuri Otsuka, Honorary professor of Keisen University, Japan. Christian writer and researcher. Japanese Wikipedia
- Sachiko Kokubu, actress, alumnus of Junior College English literature department.
- Rieko Hara, alumnus of Faculty of Humanities.
- Sasagu Arai, Professor of Theology
- Masami Ohinata, professor of Department of Human Life and Environment Studies.
- Kenji Kawashima, professor of Department of International Social Studies.
- Yuichi Yoshikawa, professor and translator.
- Satoshi Fujita, professor of horticulture and regular NHK presenter.
