= Satoshi Fujita =

Japanese horticulturalist

- Born: 1959 (age 66–67)
- Occupation: Professor (horticulture)
- Known for: NHK presenter

Satoshi Fujita (藤田 智, Fujita Satoshi; born 1959 in Akita Prefecture) is a Japanese horticulturalist and professor of the Human Environmental Science Department at Keisen University. He appears as a gardening tipster on the NHK TV show Shumi no Engei, which entered its 5th season in 2012.

He is an alumnus of the graduate school at Iwate University.

== Selected bibliography ==
- Fujita, Satoshi (藤田智) (2007). 成功するコツがひと目でわかる野菜と果樹の育て方(Seikō suru kotsu ga hitome de wakaru yasai to kajutsu no sodatekata). Nihon Bungei sha (日本文芸社). ISBN 978-4537205312.
- Fujita, Satoshi (藤田智) (2007). 市民農園ライフ／畑を借りて野菜を作ろう(Shimin nōen life / hatake o karite yasai o tsukurō). Nikkei BP Kikaku (日経ＢＰ企画). ISBN 978-4861302459.
- Fujita, Satoshi (藤田智) (2007). キュウリのトゲはなぜ消えたのか－サプライズな『野菜学』 (Kyūri no toge wa naze kieta no ka - surprise an yasaigaku). Gakushu Kenkyusho (学習研究社). ISBN 978-4054034600.
- Fujita, Satoshi (藤田智) (2007). 野菜づくり大図鑑 (Yasai zukuri daizukan). Kodansha. ISBN 978-4062137539.
- Fujita, Satoshi (藤田智) (2009). 体においしい野菜づくり (Karada ni oishii yasai zukuri) (preview). PHP研究所. ISBN 9784569706108.
