= Masami Ohinata =

Japanese academic

Masami Ohinata is a Japanese academic and president of Keisen University in Tokyo.

== Biography ==
Ohinata specialises in the field of developmental psychology, including child development, the psychology of family relationships and the psychology of women. She also contributes to the work of a non-profit organisation, Ai-Port Station, which provides a free social space for parents and children and a temporary daycare service.

== Publications ==
- The mystique of motherhood: a key to understanding social change and family problems in Japan in Fujimura-Fanselow, K., & Kameda, A. (1995). Japanese women: New feminist perspectives on the past, present, and future. New York: The Feminist Press at the City University of New York.
