= Satoshi Utsunomiya =

Japanese fossil hunter (born 1969)

- Born: 1969 (age 56–57); Japan Ehime Prefecture
- Education: Ritsumeikan University (Undergraduate); Kagoshima University (Graduate School)
- Known for: Discoveries of fossils like Satsuma-utsunomiya-ryu, Satsuma-yokuryu, dinosaur remains etc.
- Scientific career
- Fields: Paleontology
- Workplaces: Panasonic; Osaka Museum of Natural History (Visiting Researcher)
- Academic advisors: Kei Kizugawa; Hideo Nakaya

Satoshi Utsunomiya (born 1969) is a Japanese fossil collector and science writer. He is an external researcher at the Osaka Museum of Natural History. He is known as the "Salaryman Fossil Hunter".

The plesiosaur (also known as Satsuma-utsunomiya-ryu) was named after the old regional name of the discovery site and the discoverer, Satoshi Utsunomiya. His other discoveries include a spinosaurid tooth fossil and remains of a giant mosasaur.

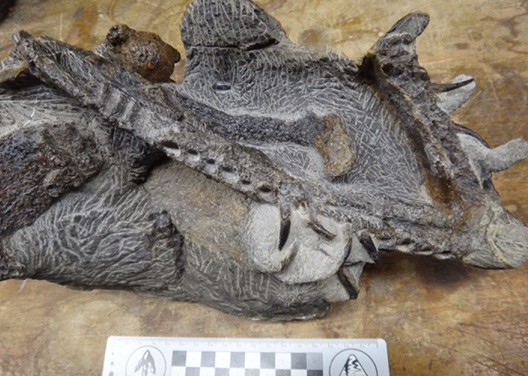
Satsuma-utsunomiya-ryu, elasmosaurid he discovered

== Biography ==
Born in Ehime Prefecture. In 1992, after graduating from Ritsumeikan University, he joined Matsushita Electric Industrial Co., Ltd. (now Panasonic) as an employee. He continued fossil collecting as a hobby while working as a company employee. As a lifelong pursuit, he conducted excavations of prehistoric creatures, discovering numerous large vertebrate fossils in various parts of Japan. These discoveries include Satsuma-utsunomiya-ryu, named after him, as well as dinosaurs (carnivorous, herbivorous, and piscivorous), mosasaur, pterosaur, and other major Mesozoic vertebrate fossils in Japan.

In 2004, for the research thesis on plesiosaur discovered in Kagoshima Prefecture, he enrolled in the master's program at Kagoshima University where the specimens were stored (2014). During his spare time as a company employee, he advanced the cleaning and research of the specimens.

Under the guidance of Hideo Nakaya (then a professor at Kagoshima University) and Tamaki Sato (Professor at Kanagawa University), he published a thesis about Satsuma-utsunomiya-ryu in 2019. This thesis clarified that it is the oldest Elasmosauridae in East Asia. Furthermore, during the cleaning process of Satsumautsunomiyaryu, he discovered foreign objects in its throat. In collaboration with Yasuhisa Nakajima of Tokyo City University, they announced the world's first plaeiosaur "pellet" fossil.

With Nakajima, he has also collaborated on other research, including the discovery of Spinosauridae fossils in Wakayama Prefecture, pterosaur fossils discovered in Kagoshima (commonly referred to as Satsuma-yokuryu), and the excavation and research of a dinosaur bone bed in Kagoshima Prefecture, among others.

Regarding Satsuma-utsunomiya-ryu, he handled everything from discovery and excavation to cleaning, research, and paper publication. The specimen of Satsuma-utsunomiya-ryu is currently on permanent display at the Kagoshima Prefectural Museum.

Furthermore, he has authored several works on paleontology and writes paleontology columns in newspapers. He also engages in lecture activities.

== Major discoveries ==
- Discovery of Satsuma-utsunomiya-ryu, the oldest Elasmosauridae in East Asia (2004, Kagoshima Prefecture).
- Discovery of a domestically rare new species of coral fossil, Syringopora utsunomiyai (2005, Miyazaki Prefecture).
- Discovery of fossils of a large Theropod teeth (2008, Ishikawa Prefecture).
- Discovery of plant-eating dinosaur fossils of the Iguanodontidae (Kagoshima Prefecture).
- Discovery of the mandible fossil of the largest Mosasaurid in Japan (2010, Osaka Prefecture).
- Discovery of the first hybodont Lissodus found in Japan (2010, Ehime Prefecture).
- Discovery of the first Spinosauridae fossil found in Japan (2018, Wakayama Prefecture).
- Discovery of the first pterosaur fossil in Kagoshima Prefecture (Satsuma-yokuryu) (2020, Kagoshima Prefecture).
- Discovery of the world's first Elasmosaurid pellet (2021, Kagoshima Prefecture).
- Discovery of a dinosaur bone bed (2021, Kagoshima Prefecture).
- Discovery of the oldest East Asian sea turtle fossil (Satsuma-mukashi-umigame) (2024, Kagoshima Prefecture).

== Career and academic contributions ==
=== Publications ===
- Satoshi Utsunomiya (March 2019). "Discovery of the Eastern Asia's Oldest Elasmosauridae (Reptilia, Sauropterygia, Plesiosauria) from the Upper Cretaceous Myoso Formation in Shishijima, Nagashima-cho, Kagoshima, Japan". Bulletin of the Osaka Museum of Natural History. 73. Osaka Museum of Natural History: 23–35. doi:10.20643/00001333.
- Konishi, Takuya; Tanimoto, Masahiro; Utsunomiya, Satoshi; Sato, Masahiro; Watanabe, Katsunori (2012). "A Large Mosasaurine (Squamata: Mosasauridae) from the Latest Cretaceous of Osaka Prefecture (SW Japan)". Paleontological Research. 16 (2): 79–87. doi:10.2517/1342-8144-16.2.079.
- Satoshi Utsunomiya (2020). "Ammonites from the Upper Cretaceous Goshoura Group, Hegushi Formation, Shishijima Island, Kagoshima Prefecture, Japan". Chigaku Kenkyu (Journal of the Geological Society of Japan). 66 (1): 5–14.
- Masatoshi Goto; Takeshi Tanaka; Satoshi Utsunomiya (2010). "On a tooth remain of Lissodus (Elasmobranchii) from the Taho Formation (Lower Triassic) in Seiyo City, Ehime Prefecture, Southwest Japan". Earth Science (Chikyū Kagaku). 64 (3): 111–116. doi:10.15080/agcjchikyukagaku.64.3_111.
- 伊藤謙; 宇都宮聡; 小原正顕; 塚腰実; 渡辺克典; 福田舞子; 廣川和花; 髙橋京子; 上田貴洋; 橋爪節也; 江口太郎 (March 2015). "<研究資料>日本の地質学黎明期における歴史的地質資料 : 梅谷亨化石標本群（大阪大学適塾記念センター蔵）についての考察". Bulletin of the International Research Center for Japanese Studies. 51. International Research Center for Japanese Studies: 157–167. doi:10.15055/00005572. ISSN 0915-0900.
- Yasuhisa Nakajima; Satoshi Utsunomiya (April 13, 2022). "鹿児島県長島町獅子島の白亜系御所浦層群から産出した翼竜類化石". Fossil Research. 54. J-GLOBAL: 2–60.
- TANIMOTO Masahiro; UTSUNOMIYA Satoshi (2010). "A dinosaur fossil from the Cenomanian Shishijima Formation in Kagoshima Prefecture, southwest Japan". Nippon Chigakukenkyu-Kai. 58. Geological Literature Search: 225–228.
