= Satoshi Osugi =

Japanese footballer

Satoshi Osugi 大杉 啓
Personal information
- Date of birth: 22 December 1996 (age 29)
- Place of birth: Shizuoka, Shizuoka, Japan
- Height: 1.81 m (5 ft 11 in)
- Position: Goalkeeper

Team information
- Current team: Kochi United
- Number: 21

Youth career
- Shizuoka Yokouchi SSS
- –2014: Shizuoka Gakuen HS
- 2015–2017: Nippon Sport Science University

Senior career*
Years	Team	Apps	(Gls)
2018	Malvern City	6	(0)
2018–2019	Kingston City	13	(0)
2019	Caroline Springs George Cross		
2020	Shinagawa CC		
2021	Fujieda MYFC	2	(0)
2022–2023	Fukushima United	5	(0)
2024–	Kochi United	55	(0)
- * Club domestic league appearances and goals as of 1 January 2026

Satoshi Osugi (大杉 啓, Osugi Satoshi; born 22 December 1996) is a Japanese footballer who playing as a goalkeeper and currently play for J3 League club, Kochi United.

== Career ==
In his third year at Shizuoka Gakuen Junior and Senior High School, he participated in the All Japan High School Soccer Tournament, but because first-year student Takumi Yamanoi was selected, he finished the tournament without playing in a match.

After graduating from Nippon Sport Science University, he went to Australia and continued to play for lower league clubs.

On 20 July 2020, Osugi joined to Shinagawa CC in the Kanagawa Prefecture Adult Soccer League Division 1 for mid 2020 season.

On 14 January 2021, Osugi was announce official transfer to J3 club, Fujieda MYFC for 2021 season. On 1 December at same year, Osugi was announce official leaving from his club. Nine days later at same year, he participated in a J.League joint tryout at Fukuda Denshi Arena.

On 19 January 2022, Osugi was announce official transfer to J3 club, Fukushima United for 2022 season.

On 5 December 2023, Osugi was announce official contract expire with Fukushima United. Seven days later of the same year, he participated in a J.League joint tryout.

On 8 January 2024, Osugi was announce official transfer to JFL club, Kochi United for 2024 season. This year, he played in all 30 league matches and also played in two legs in the J3/JFL playoff matches, contributing to Kochi promotion to J3 League for the first time in their history.

== Career statistics ==
=== Club ===
As of the match played 16 February 2025.

Club	Season	League			National Cup		League Cup		Other		Total	
Club	Season	Division	Apps	Goals	Apps	Goals	Apps	Goals	Apps	Goals	Apps	Goals
Malvern City	2018	Victorian State League 1	6	0	0	0	–		0	0	6	0
Kingston City	2019	NPL Victoria	13	0	0	0	–		0	0	13	0
Fujieda MYFC	2021	J3 League	2	0	0	0	–		0	0	2	0
Fukushima United	2022	J3 League	4	0	0	0	–		0	0	4	0
Fukushima United	2023	J3 League	1	0	0	0	–		0	0	1	0
Kochi United	2024	Japan Football League	30	0	2	0	–		0	0	32	0
Kochi United	2025	J3 League	1	0	0	0	0	0	0	0	1	0
Career total			57	0	2	0	0	0	0	0	59	0

== Honours ==
Kochi United

- J3/JFL Play-off winner: 2024
