= List of mosasaur genera =

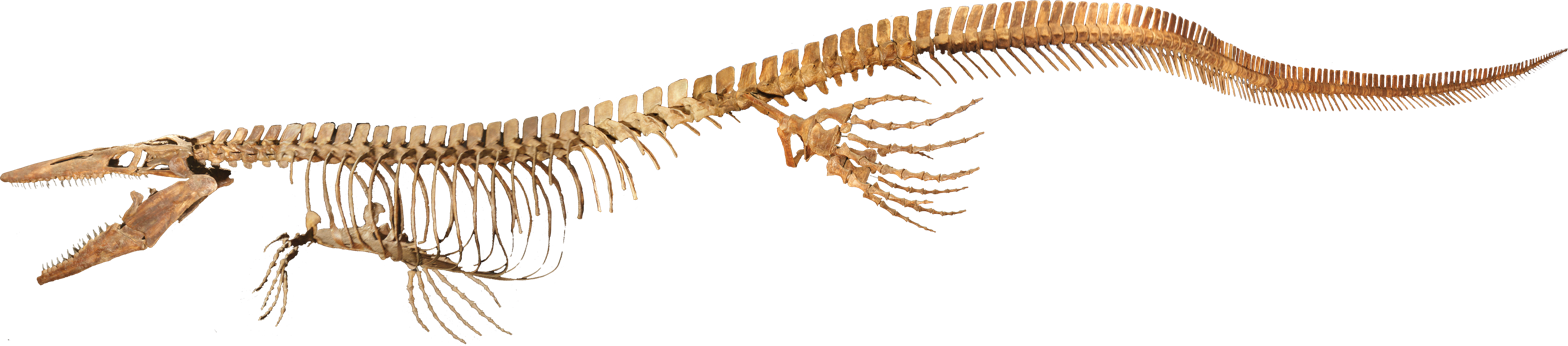
Tylosaurus rex mounted skeleton in the Rocky Mountain Dinosaur Resource Center in Woodland Park, Colorado

This list of mosasaurs is a comprehensive listing of all genera that have ever been included in the family Mosasauridae or the parent clade Mosasauroidea, excluding purely vernacular terms. The list includes all commonly accepted genera, but also genera that are now considered invalid, doubtful (nomen dubium), or were not formally published (nomen nudum), as well as junior synonyms of more established names, and genera that are no longer considered mosasauroid. Non-mosasaurid mosasauroids shall be noted as such. The list currently includes 92 genera, out of which 58 are considered valid (47 mosasaurids and 10 other mosasauroids).

== Scope and terminology ==
There is no official, canonical list of mosasaur genera but one of the most thorough attempts can be found on the "Pythonomorpha" section of Mikko Haaramo's Phylogeny Archive.

Naming conventions and terminology follow the International Code of Zoological Nomenclature. Technical terms used include:

- Junior synonym: A name which describes the same taxon as a previously published name. If two or more genera are formally designated and the type specimens are later assigned to the same genus, the first to be published (in chronological order) is the senior synonym, and all other instances are junior synonyms. Senior synonyms are generally used, except by special decision of the ICZN, but junior synonyms cannot be used again, even if deprecated. Junior synonymy is often subjective, unless the genera described were both based on the same type specimen.
- Nomen nudum (Latin for "naked name"): A name that has appeared in print but has not yet been formally published by the standards of the ICZN. Nomina nuda (the plural form) are invalid, and are therefore not italicized as a proper generic name would be. If the name is later formally published, that name is no longer a nomen nudum and will be italicized on this list. Often, the formally published name will differ from any nomina nuda that describe the same specimen. In this case, these nomina nuda will be deleted from this list in favor of the published name.
- Preoccupied name: A name that is formally published, but which has already been used for another taxon. This second use is invalid (as are all subsequent uses) and the name must be replaced. As preoccupied names are not valid generic names, they will also go unitalicized on this list.
- Nomen dubium (Latin for "dubious name"): A name describing a fossil with no unique diagnostic features.

== Mosasaur genera ==
Genus	Author(s)	Year	Status	Age	Location	Notes	Images
Acteosaurus	Meyer	1860	Valid	Late Cretaceous	Slovenia	Its vertebral column resembles that of extant varanid lizards	
Adriosaurus	Seeley	1881	Valid	Late Cretaceous	Croatia; Slovenia	The A. skrbinensis specimen preserves a phosphatic matter in its stomach area, likely remains of fish, which suggests it may have been piscivorous	
Aigialosaurus	Kramberger	1892	Valid	Late Cretaceous	Croatia	Has been suggested to be the oldest known member of the lineage that led to the larger mosasaurids	
Amphekepubis	Mehl	1930	Dubious	Late Cretaceous	Mexico	Possibly a junior synonym of Mosasaurus	
Amphorosteus	Gibbs	1851	Dubious	Late Cretaceous	United States	Only known from two, heavily weathered vertebrae	
Ancylocentrum	Schmidt	1927	Jr. synonym	N/A	N/A	Junior synonym of Prognathodon	
Angolasaurus	Antunes	1964	Valid	Late Cretaceous	Angola; Brazil? Niger? United States?	Mostly similar to the related Platecarpus, but with a somewhat longer skull	
Aphanizocnemus	Dal Sasso & Pinna	1997	Valid	Late Cretaceous	Lebanon	Although commonly regarded as a dolichosaurid, a few analyses suggest it may be outside of that group	
Baptosaurus	Marsh	1870	Jr. synonym	N/A	N/A	Junior synonym of Halisaurus	
Baseodon	Leidy	1865	Jr. synonym	N/A	N/A	Junior synonym of Mosasaurus	
Batrachiosaurus	Harlan	1839	Jr. synonym	N/A	N/A	Junior synonym of Mosasaurus	
Bentiabasaurus	Polcyn, Schulp & Gonçalves	2023	Valid	Late Cretaceous	Angola	Discovered as a stomach content of an adult Prognathodon	
Brachysaurana	Strand	1926	Jr. synonym	N/A	N/A	Junior synonym of Prognathodon	
Brachysaurus	Williston	1897	Preoccupied	N/A	N/A	Preoccupied by a junior synonym of iguanian lizard genus Stenocercus; referred to replacement names Brachysaurana and Ancylocentrum, of which the latter has priority as such, although both names are synonyms of Prognathodon	
Carinodens	Thurmond	1969	Valid	Late Cretaceous	Belgium; Denmark; Jordan; Morocco; Netherlands; Russia; Ukraine	Closely related to Globidens, but can be distinguished by its compressed teeth	
Carsosaurus	Kornhuber	1893	Valid	Late Cretaceous	Slovenia	Preserves skin impressions and sternal cartilage	
Clidastes	Cope	1868	Valid	Late Cretaceous	United States	One of the earliest known hydropedal mosasaurs	
Compressidens	Dollo	1924	Preoccupied	N/A	N/A	Preoccupied by a tusk shell; later renamed Carinodens	
Coniasaurus	Owen	1850	Valid	Late Cretaceous	Germany; United Kingdom; United States	Only known from incomplete remains, but they are enough to tell that it had an elongated skull containing specialized dentition	
Dallasaurus	Polcyn & Bell	2005	Valid	Late Cretaceous	United States	Has been said to be a "missing link" uniting fully aquatic mosasaur taxa and their terrestrial ancestors	
Dolichosaurus	Owen	1894	Valid	Late Cretaceous	United Kingdom	Possessed an exceptionally long neck	
Dollosaurus	Yakovlev	1905	Jr. synonym	N/A	N/A	Junior synonym of Prognathodon	
Drepanodon	Leidy	1856	Jr. synonym	N/A	N/A	Junior synonym of Mosasaurus	
Ectenosaurus	Russell	1967	Valid	Late Cretaceous	United States	One of the few plioplatecarpines that was not exclusive to nearshore marine environments	
Edestosaurus	Marsh	1871	Jr. synonym	N/A	N/A	Junior synonym of Clidastes	
Eidolosaurus	Nopcsa	1923	Valid	Late Cretaceous	Slovenia	One of the oldest known mosasauroids	
Elliptonodon	Emmons	1858	Jr. synonym	N/A	N/A	Junior synonym of Tylosaurus	
Eonatator	Bardet et al.	2005	Valid	Late Cretaceous	Colombia; Sweden; United States	The type species was originally referred to Clidastes and Halisaurus	
Eremiasaurus	LeBlanc et al.	2012	Valid	Late Cretaceous	Brazil; Israel; Morocco	Characterised by its robust skull with pronounced heterodont dentition	
Garamaudo	Bardet et al.	2026	Valid	Late Cretaceous	France	Its name honors a serpentine aquatic creature from Provençal folklore	
Gavialimimus	Strong et al.	2020	Valid	Late Cretaceous	Angola? Morocco	Unusually, its snout was elongated, convergent with the extant gharial, hence its genus name	
Globidens	Gilmore	1912	Valid	Late Cretaceous	Angola; Brazil; Colombia; Jordan; Morocco; Syria; United States	Known for its rounded teeth, an adaptation to crush shelled prey such as molluscs	
Gnathomortis	Lively	2020	Valid	Late Cretaceous	United States	Previously identified as a species of Prognathodon, but it has been found to be different enough from that taxon to receive its own genus	
Goronyosaurus	Azzaroli et al.	1972	Valid	Late Cretaceous	Niger; Nigeria	Possessed straight teeth with rounded apices more well suited for smashing food	
Haasiasaurus	Polcyn et al.	2003	Valid	Late Cretaceous	Palestine	Possibly chimeric as all referred remains were not found in association	
Hainosaurus	Dollo	1885	Valid?	Late Cretaceous	Belgium; Canada?	Possible junior synonym of Tylosaurus	
Halisaurus	Marsh	1869	Valid	Late Cretaceous	Egypt; Jordan? Morocco; Peru? United States	May have been a poor swimmer due to the lack of hyperphalangy as seen in more derived genera	
Harranasaurus	Kaddumi	2009	Valid	Late Cretaceous	Jordan	Only known from a single mandible	
Holcodus	Gibbs	1851	Jr. synonym	N/A	N/A	Junior synonym of Platecarpus	
Holosaurus	Marsh	1880	Preoccupied	N/A	N/A	Referred to Platecarpus	
Hydrosaurus	Kornhuber	1873	Preoccupied	N/A	N/A	Preoccupied by agamid lizard genus Hydrosaurus; renamed Pontosaurus	
Igdamanosaurus	Lingham-Soliar	1991	Valid	Late Cretaceous	Egypt; Niger	Its dentary was massively built, similar to Prognathodon and its relative Globidens	
Jormungandr	Zietlow, Boyd & van Vranken	2023	Valid	Late Cretaceous	United States	Shares features of its skeleton with both basal and derived mosasaurines	
Kaganaias	Evans et al.	2006	Valid	Early Cretaceous	Japan	The oldest and basalmost known dolichosaurid	
Kaikaifilu	Otero et al.	2017	Valid	Late Cretaceous	Antarctica	Potentially a tylosaurine, although some researchers consider this assignment problematic	
Khinjaria	Longrich et al.	2024	Valid	Late Cretaceous	Morocco	May have probably hunted large prey items due to its large body size and blade-like teeth. Closely related to Goronyosaurus	
Kolposaurus	Camp	1942	Preoccupied	N/A	N/A	Preoccupied by a junior synonym of the unrelated Nothosaurus; referred to Plotosaurus	
Komensaurus	Caldwell & Palci	2007	Valid	Late Cretaceous	Slovenia	Before its formal description, it had been nicknamed the "Trieste aigialosaur"	
Kourisodon	Nicholls & Meckert	2002	Valid	Late Cretaceous	Canada; Japan	Coexisted with several elasmosaurids, turtles, and other mosasaurs	
Lakumasaurus	Novas et al.	2002	Jr. synonym	N/A	N/A	Junior synonym of Taniwhasaurus	
Latoplatecarpus	Konishi & Caldwell	2011	Valid	Late Cretaceous	Canada; Russia; United States	One of the largest named plioplatecarpines	
Leiodon	Owen	1841	Preoccupied	N/A	N/A	Preoccupied by a fish; referred to Liodon	
Lesticodus	Leidy	1859	Jr. synonym	N/A	N/A	Junior synonym of Mosasaurus	
Lestosaurus	Marsh	1872	Jr. synonym	N/A	N/A	Junior synonym of Platecarpus	
Liodon	Agassiz	1846	Dubious	Late Cretaceous	United Kingdom	Several species have been referred to this genus, although they do not belong to a single taxon	
Macrosaurus	Owen	1849	Jr. synonym	N/A	N/A	Junior synonym of Mosasaurus	
Megapterygius	Konishi et al.	2023	Valid	Late Cretaceous	Japan	The neural spines of its posterior dorsal vertebrae have an abrupt change in orientation, which would have supported a dolphin-like dorsal fin in life	
Mesoleptos	Cornalia & Chiozza	1852	Valid	Late Cretaceous	Croatia; Palestine; Slovenia	An early member of the Mosasauroidea	
Moanasaurus	Wiffen	1980	Valid	Late Cretaceous	New Zealand	One of the largest known mosasaurines	
Mosasaurus	Conybeare	1822	Valid	Late Cretaceous	Antarctica; Argentina; Belgium; Brazil; Canada; Jordan; Morocco; Netherlands; Russia; South Africa; Turkey; United States	The first mosasaur genus ever named and described	
Nectoportheus	Cope	1868	Jr. synonym	N/A	N/A	Junior synonym of Mosasaurus	
Oneirosaurus	Páramo-Fonseca et al.	2025	Valid	Late Cretaceous	Colombia	Known from a single, well-preserved skull	
Opetiosaurus	Kornhuber	1901	Valid	Late Cretaceous	Croatia	Has been suggested to be synonymous with Aigialosaurus, but this was not supported by subsequent research	
Oterognathus	Dollo	1889	Jr. synonym	N/A	N/A	Junior synonym of Plioplatecarpus	
Pannoniasaurus	Makádi, Caldwell & Ősi	2012	Valid	Late Cretaceous	Hungary	Lived in a freshwater habitat unlike other members of its family, which were marine predators	
Phosphorosaurus	Dollo	1889	Valid	Late Cretaceous	Belgium; Japan	Had large eye sockets, which imply it would have hunted its prey in deep water or at night	
Platecarpus	Cope	1869	Valid	Late Cretaceous	Australia? Belgium? United States	One specimen is so well-preserved it shows that mosasaurs were powerful, agile swimmers	
Plesioplatecarpus	Konishi & Caldwell	2011	Valid	Late Cretaceous	United States	Six specimens are known to date	
Plesiotylosaurus	Camp	1942	Valid	Late Cretaceous	United States	Some traits of its skull are seemingly convergent with tylosaurine mosasaurs	
Plioplatecarpus	Dollo	1882	Valid	Late Cretaceous	Canada; Netherlands; Sweden; United States	Lived in a broad range as suggested by its fossil record	
Plotosaurus	Camp	1951	Valid	Late Cretaceous	United States	Unusually, its overall morphology was more similar to that of ichthyosaurs than to other mosasaurs, which led to its quite derived position within the latter group	
Pluridens	Lingham-Soliar	1998	Valid	Late Cretaceous	Morocco; Niger; Nigeria	Some specimens preserve injuries to their jaws, which would indicate they may have engaged in intraspecific combat	
Pontosaurus	Gorjanovic-Kramberger	1892	Valid	Late Cretaceous	Croatia; Lebanon	Two species are known	
Portunatasaurus	Mekarski et al.	2019	Valid	Late Cretaceous	Croatia	Has been used as a subject for the understanding on the evolution of mosasauroid limb morphology	
Primitivus	Paparella et al.	2018	Valid	Late Cretaceous	Italy	The first dolichosaurid named from Italy	
Proaigialosaurus	Kuhn	1958	Valid	Late Jurassic	Germany	Often regarded as an aigialosaurid, but it may have also been a pleurosaurid	
Prognathodon	Dollo	1889	Valid	Late Cretaceous	Angola? Belgium; Canada? Israel; Jordan; Mexico; Netherlands? New Zealand? Spain; Syria; Ukraine; United States?	Possibly paraphyletic as most assigned species may not belong to this genus	
Prognathosaurus	Williston	1897	Jr. synonym	N/A	N/A	Junior synonym of Prognathodon	
Pterycollosaurus	Dollo	1882	Jr. synonym	N/A	N/A	Junior synonym of Mosasaurus	
Rhamphosaurus	Cope	1872	Preoccupied	N/A	N/A	Preoccupied by another lizard genus; referred to Tylosaurus	
Rhinosaurus	Marsh	1872	Preoccupied	N/A	N/A	Preoccupied; referred to Tylosaurus	
Rikisaurus	Wiffen	1990	Jr. synonym	N/A	N/A	Junior synonym of Moanasaurus	
Rikkisaurus	Bell et al.	1999	Lapsus calami	N/A	N/A	Lapsus calami of Rikisaurus, a junior synonym of Moanasaurus	
Romeosaurus	Palci et al.	2013	Valid	Late Cretaceous	Italy	None of the described specimens has enough well-preserved postcranial material, making it somewhat difficult to make any good judgements of the genus' full anatomy	
Russellosaurus	Polcyn & Bell	2005	Valid	Late Cretaceous	United States	One of the oldest mosasaurs described from North America	
Sarabosaurus	Polcyn et al.	2023	Valid	Late Cretaceous	United States	Based on remains of a mature animal as indicated by its preserved growth rings	
Saurochampsa	Wagler	1830	Jr. synonym	N/A	N/A	Junior synonym of Mosasaurus	
Selmasaurus	Wright & Shannon	1988	Valid	Late Cretaceous	United States	Would have been unable to widen its jaws to attack large prey due to its uniquely akinetic skull	
Sironectes	Cope	1840	Jr. synonym	N/A	N/A	Junior synonym of Platecarpus	
Stelladens	Longrich et al.	2023	Valid	Late Cretaceous	Morocco	Named for its star-shaped teeth	
Taniwhasaurus	Hector	1874	Valid	Late Cretaceous	Antarctica; Japan? New Zealand; South Africa?	May have possessed an electro-sensitive organ in its snout foramina that was likely capable of detecting movements of prey underwater	
Tetrapodophis	Martill et al.	2015	Valid	Early Cretaceous	Brazil	Originally described as a basal snake but later often reinterpreted as a dolichosaurid	
Tethysaurus	Bardet, Pereda-Suberbiola & Jalil	2003	Valid	Late Cretaceous	Morocco	Exhibits a mixture of primitive and advanced features	
Thalassotitan	Longrich et al.	2022	Valid	Late Cretaceous	Morocco	Closely related to Prognathodon	
Thoraxion	Sharpe et al.	2026	Valid	Late Cretaceous	Belgium	Had a more compact ribcage than the contemporary Mosasaurus lemonnieri	
Tylosaurus	Marsh	1872	Valid	Late Cretaceous	Angola; Belgium; Canada; Democratic Republic of the Congo? France; Morocco; Sweden; United States	Some species are among the largest mosasaurs yet known	
Vallecillosaurus	Smith & Buchy	2008	Valid	Late Cretaceous	Mexico	One of the oldest mosasauroids ever described	
Xenodens	Longrich et al.	2021	Valid	Late Cretaceous	Morocco	One study considered this taxon a nomen dubium due to the lack of authenticity, but this was refuted by the discovery of additional material and CT scans	
Yaguarasaurus	Páramo	1994	Valid	Late Cretaceous	Colombia; Mexico	The most completely known South American mosasaur during the time of its description	

== See also ==
- Mosasaur
- Platynota
- Aigialosaur
