= Acteosaurus =

Acteosaurus Temporal range: 99.6–89.3 Ma Late Cretaceous: Cenomanian - Turonian

Scientific classification
- Domain: Eukaryota
- Kingdom: Animalia
- Phylum: Chordata
- Class: Reptilia
- Order: Squamata
- Clade: Pythonomorpha
- Genus: †Acteosaurus; Meyer, 1860

Species
- Acteosaurus tommasinii type Meyer, 1860; (?)A. crassicostatus Calligaris, 1993

Extinct genus of lizards

Acteosaurus is an extinct genus of aquatic lizard that lived in the upper Cretaceous period. Its species, A. tommasinii and A. crassicostatus, were described in 1860 and 1993. Though A. crassicostatus is probably a junior synonym for Adriosaurus suessi, A. tommasinii was found to be similar to coniasaurs, mosasauroids, and a sister taxon to modern snakes in 2010.

== Etymology ==
The primary portion of Acteosaurus' name comes from Actaeon (/ækˈtiːən/; Greek: Άκταίων), a famous Theban hero who was hunted and killed by the goddess Artemis. The second part of the name is the Greek word sauros (σαυρος), which means "lizard" or "reptile". The type species was named after the botanist Muzio Giuseppe Spirito de Tommasini (1794—1879), the Podestà—or magistrate—of Trieste under the Habsburgs.

== Taxonomy ==
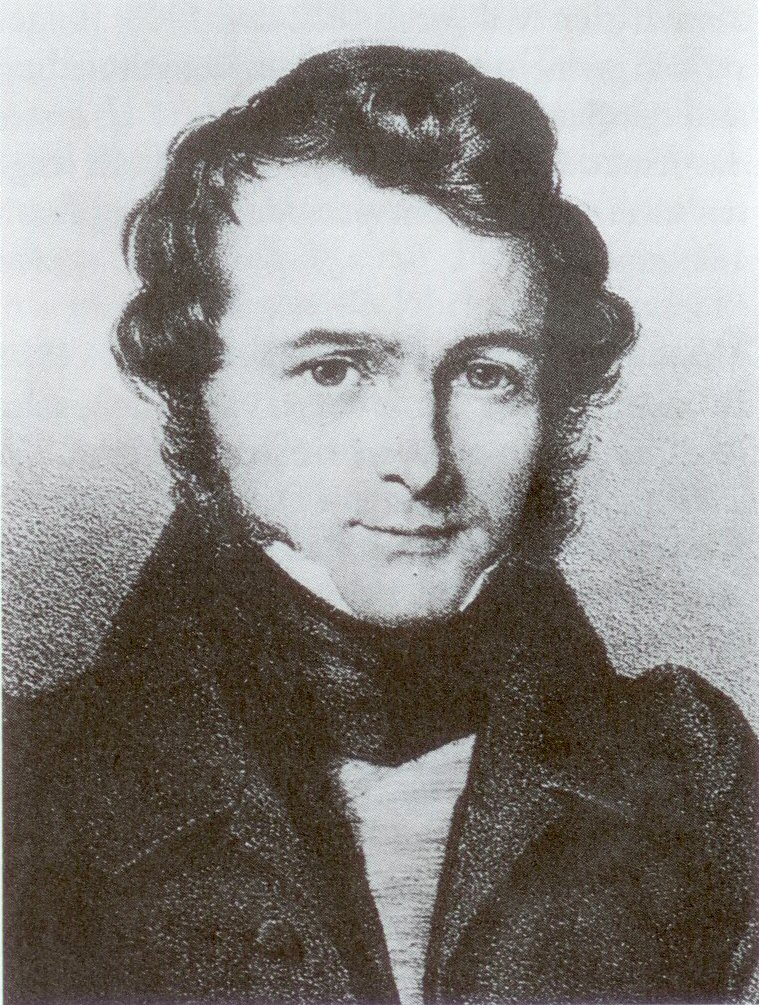
Hermann von Meyer (1801-1869)

As a genus, Acteosaurus was described in 1860 by German paleontologist Christian Erich Hermann von Meyer. There exist two known species of Acteosaurus called A. tommasinii (type species) and A. crassicostatus, the latter of which suggested as a junior synonym of Adriosaurus suessi.

A 2010 redescription of the type species found "monophyly of the clade Ophidiomorpha". This included the Dolichosauridae, Pontosaurus, Aphanizocnemus, and Adriosaurus. Acteosaurus was found to be a basal ophidiomorph (similar to Adriosaurus) and sister taxon to the Ophidia, or modern snakes.

== Description ==
Acteosaurus is described as slender or snake-like, similar to other dolichosaurids. Its shortened forelimbs and long tail help to distinguish it from other genera, and its vertebral column is similar to more modern varanid lizards. It was a small reptile measuring 30 cm (12 in) long.

The holotype, when it was discovered, was unfortunately missing its head. So, while Meyer was unable to come up with an exact number, he noted that Acteosaurus has at least 10 cervical vertebrae, and 27 dorsals. There are small articular processes on the trunk vertebrae, and it has long, narrow neural spines, and posteroventrally positioned, unfused haemal arches on the vertebrae of the tail. There is no pachyostosis, or bone thickening, in the vertebrae and ribs. The limbs are reduced in size, and though the forelimbs of Acteosaurus are fully developed, they are smaller than the hind limbs. Acteosaurus' pelvic bone is flattened, has square-shaped pubic process, and a rectangular descending ramus.

== Distribution and habitat ==
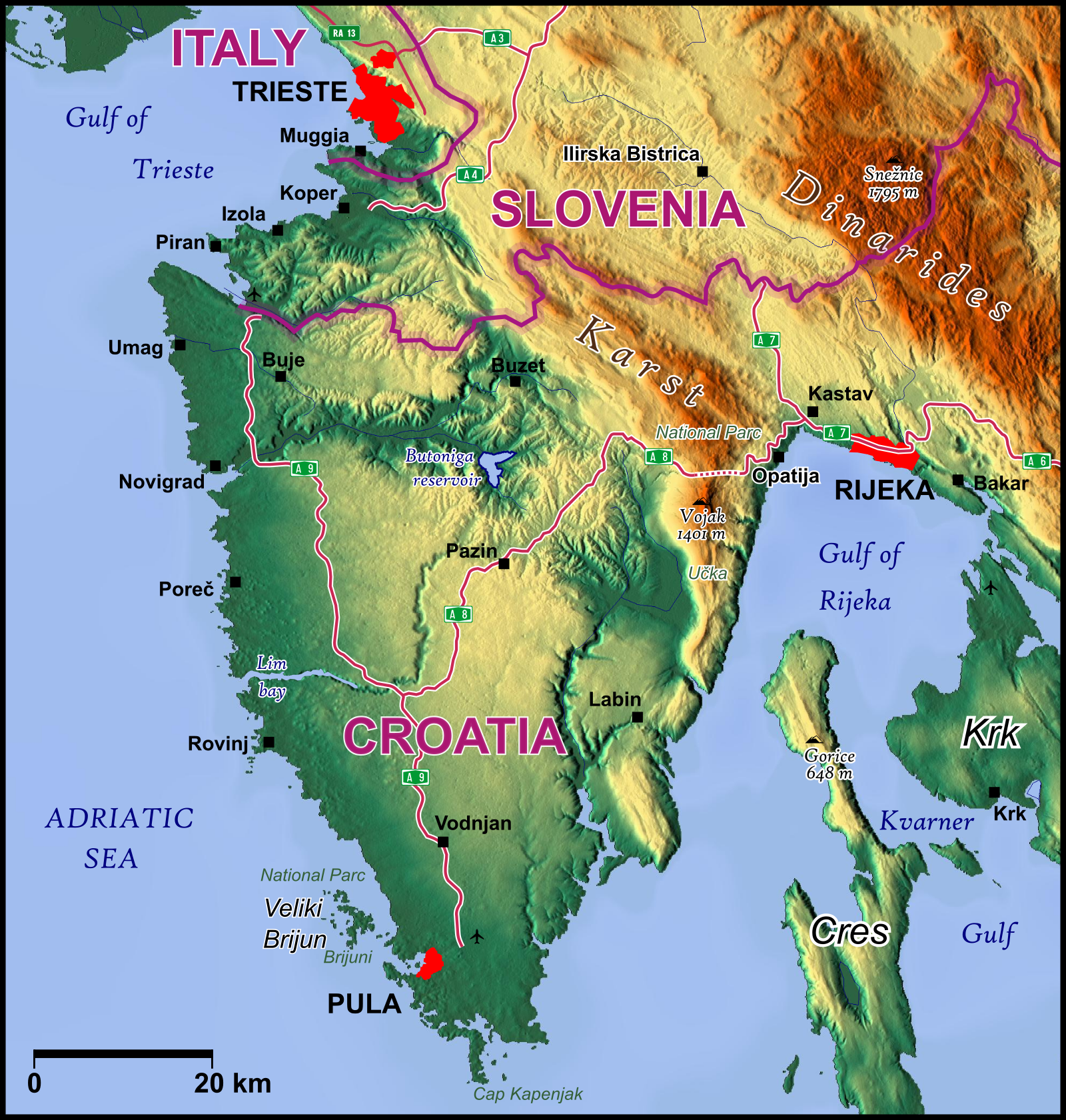
The Istrian peninsula

Both Acteosaurus tommasinii and A. crassicostatus were found in the upper section of karst Cenomanian platy limestone, in Komen, Slovenia. Komen is part of Istria, a peninsula on the Adriatic Sea, and also a section of the Karst Plateau. During the late Cretaceous, most of Europe was an island chain in the Tethys Ocean, and Acteosaurus' aquatic nature and similarity to mosasauroids suggests that it lived on the coast of one of these islands.

== See also ==
- List of mosasaurs
- Eidolosaurus
- Dorsetisaurus
- Pontosaurus
