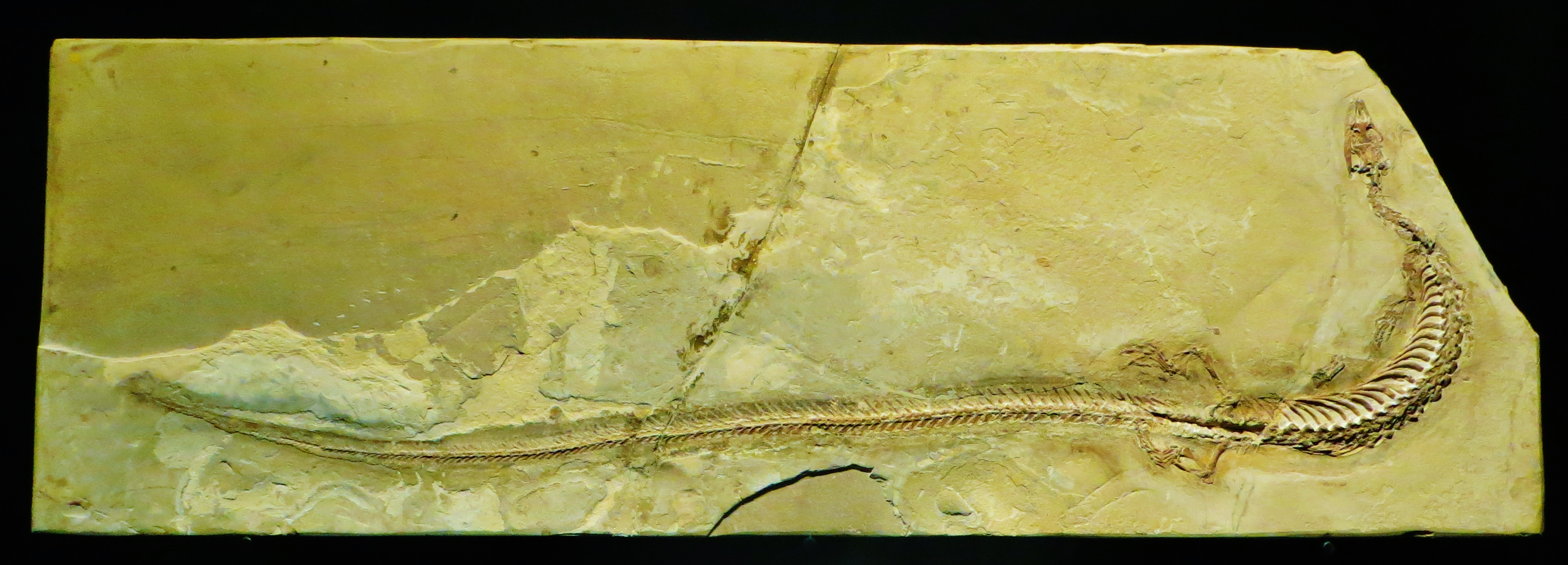
- Fossil skeleton of Pontosaurus

Scientific classification
- Kingdom: Animalia
- Phylum: Chordata
- Class: Reptilia
- Order: Squamata
- Clade: Toxicofera
- Family: †Dolichosauridae; Gervais, 1852

Genera
- †Acteosaurus; †Adriosaurus; †Aphanizocnemus; †Coniasaurus; †Dolichosaurus; †Judeasaurus?; †Kaganaias; †Pontosaurus; †Primitivus; †Tetrapodophis

= Dolichosauridae =

Dolichosauridae Temporal range: Hauterivian - late Campanian, 129–72 Ma

Extinct family of lizards

Dolichosauridae (from Latin, dolichos = "long" and Greek sauros= lizard) is a family of Cretaceous aquatic lizards. They are widely considered to be the earliest and most primitive members of Mosasauria, though some researchers have recovered them as more closely related to snakes.

== Description ==
Dolichosaurus was a small marine squamate at about 0.5 to 1 meter in total length. Coniasaurus was similarly sized at about 0.5 meters in length. They were elongated (especially apparent in the neck) marine lizards with reduced limbs and small, thin heads. Dolichosaurs may have occupied a niche similar to the earlier nothosaurs and modern sea snakes, in using their thin heads to feed in crevices and narrow spaces along coral reefs and rocky shores. One of the earliest dolichosaurs, Kaganaias from Barremian, probably lived in freshwater environment unlike other members in the family. Despite their aquatic nature, fluctuations in sea level did not appear to have any significant effects on dolichosaurid evolution during the Cenomanian and Turonian.

The degree to which the limbs were reduced suggest that the dolichosaurs would have been unable to generate any significant movement on land, and they thus likely spent most of their time underwater. Though the reduction of the limbs have no obvious evolutionary advantage, it is an adaptation that might be shared with early snakes.

== History of discovery ==
Both of the genera routinely referred to the Dolichosauridae, Dolichosaurus and Coniasaurus, were described by Richard Owen in 1850 based on specimens of Cenomanian age collected from the Lower Chalk of southeastern England. The unusually large number of dorsal and cervical vertebrae present in Dolichosaurus prompted it to be named as a new genus and Coniasaurus could be distinguished from known Cretaceous lizards by dental characteristics. Nopcsa (1908) restudied the specimens discovered by Owen and described several new specimens of Coniasaurus and Dolichosaurus.

== Classification ==
Many authors have suggested the dolichosaurs to be a paraphyletic group.

Both known species of Coniasaurus, C. gracilodens and C. crassidens, are known from disarticulated skulls with isolated vertebral elements. In contrast, Dolichosaurus longicollis, the only species of Dolichosaurus, is known from postcranial skeletons with only very fragmentary skulls and no teeth. This has made the exact nature of their relation difficult to determine.

Coniasaurus and Dolichosaurus are generally considered to be either nested within basal mosasauroids as a third group alongside mosasaurs and aigialosaurs, or as the sister group to the mosasauroids. The difficulties in establishing more certain relationships not only between the Dolichosauridae and the Mosasauroidea, but also between Dolichosaurus and Coniasaurus, arise from the nature of the fossil remains referred to the genera. With Coniasaurus largely lacking postcranial material and Dolichosaurus largely lacking cranial material, they are difficult to compare with each other.

Studies that propose a close relation between snakes and mosasauroids in a group dubbed Pythonomorpha demonstrate the importance of Dolichosaurus, Coniasaurus and other Late Cretaceous marine squamates in squamate phylogeny and evolutionary history. The hypothesis suggesting that snakes, mosasaurs, aigialosaurs and dolichosaurs share a common aquatic ancestor is not universally accepted and stands in stark contrast with the previously widespread hypothesis of snakes having a fossorial origin.

The cladogram below is based on Palci and Caldwell (2010a), Caldwell and Palci (2010b), placing the Dolichosauridae as a sister group to modern snakes and their closest ancestors.

- Anguimorpha
  - Anguidae
  - - - Xenosaurus
      - Shinisaurus
    - - Heloderma
      - - Varanoidea
          - Lanthanotus
          - Varanus
        - Pythonomorpha
          - - Aigialosauridae
            - Mosasauridae
          - Ophidiomorpha
            - Dolichosauridae
              - Coniasaurus
              - Dolichosaurus
            - - Pontosaurus
              - - Aphanizocnemus
                - - Adriosaurus
                  - - Acteosaurus
                    - Ophidia (snakes)

Other authors have disagreed with this hypothesis, instead placing dolichosaurs at the base of Mosasauria, with Mosasauria unrelated to snakes.

Cladogram following Augusta et al. (2022):

- Ophidia (snakes)
- - Varanoidea
  - - - Primitivus
      - Eidolosaurus
    - Mosasauria
      - Dolichosauridae
        - Aphanizocnemus
        - - Dolichosaurus
          - - Pontosaurus
            - Adriosaurus
            - Acteosaurus
      - Mosasauroidea
