= Amphorosteus =

Amphorosteus Temporal range: Late Cretaceous

Scientific classification
- Kingdom: Animalia
- Phylum: Chordata
- Class: Reptilia
- Order: Squamata
- Clade: †Mosasauria
- Family: †Mosasauridae
- Genus: †Amphorosteus; Gibbs, 1851

Type species
- †Amphorosteus brumbyi Gibbs, 1851

Extinct genus of lizards

Amphorosteus is a dubious genus of mosasaur from the Late Cretaceous of North America. It was described on the basis of two, heavily weathered vertebrae unearthed from Alabama.

== See also ==
- List of mosasaurs
