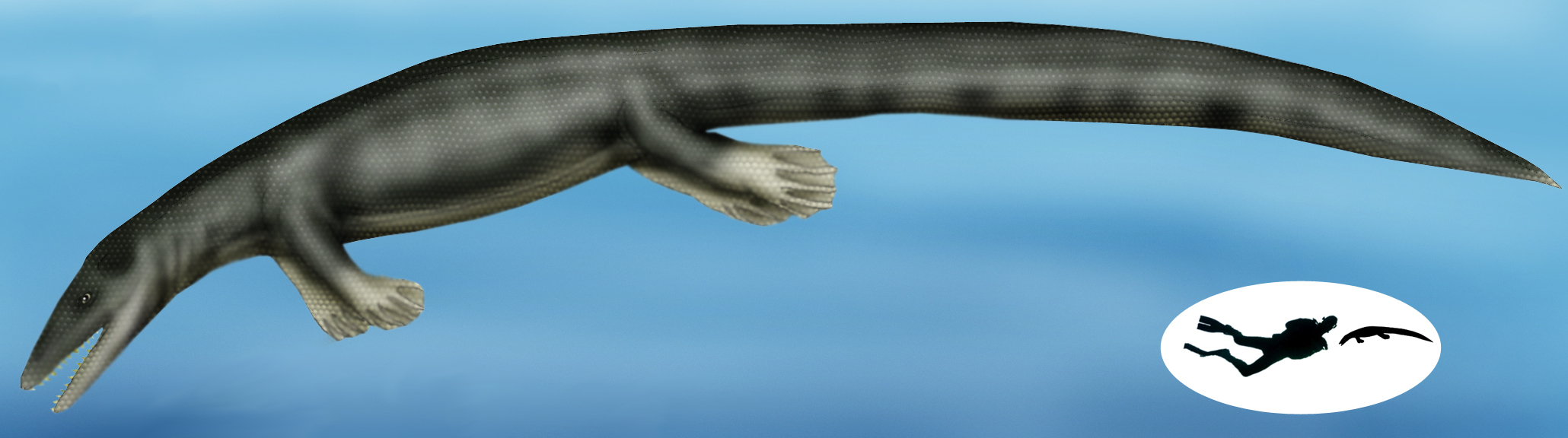

Scientific classification
- Domain: Eukaryota
- Kingdom: Animalia
- Phylum: Chordata
- Class: Reptilia
- Order: Squamata
- Clade: †Mosasauria
- Superfamily: †Mosasauroidea
- Genus: †Vallecillosaurus; Smith & Buchy, 2008

Species
- Vallecillosaurus donrobertoi Smith & Buchy, 2008

= Vallecillosaurus =

Vallecillosaurus Temporal range: 94–89 Ma Late Cretaceous

Extinct genus of lizards

Vallecillosaurus is an extinct genus of mosasauroid from the Late Cretaceous period, that lived in Mexico, in the state of Nuevo León. It was a relatively small reptile measuring less than 1 m (3.3 ft) long.

== See also ==
- List of mosasaurs
