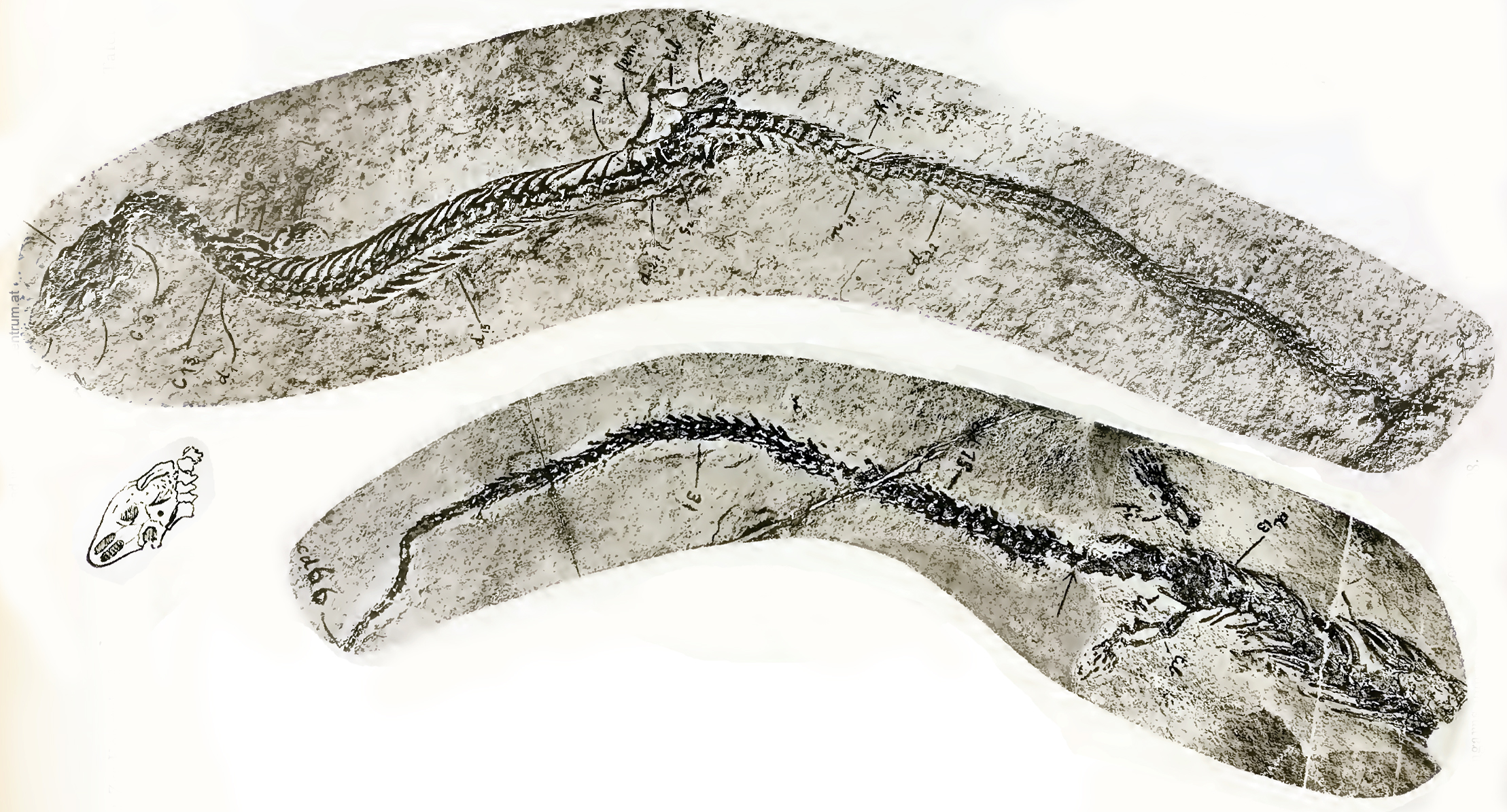
- London specimen of A. suessi above, with interpretative drawing of its skull on the left. Vienna holotype specimen of A. suessi below.

Scientific classification
- Kingdom: Animalia
- Phylum: Chordata
- Class: Reptilia
- Order: Squamata
- Clade: Pythonomorpha
- Genus: Adriosaurus; Seeley, 1881

Species
- A. microbrachis Palci & Caldwell, 2007; A. skrbinensis Caldwell & Palci, 2010; A. suessi Seeley, 1881 (type)

= Adriosaurus =

Adriosaurus Temporal range: Late Cretaceous, 95 Ma

Extinct genus of lizards

Adriosaurus is an extinct genus of squamate which lived in what is now Slovenia and other parts of Europe during the Late Cretaceous. It was a small, snake-like reptile, with the type species Adriosaurus suessi measuring up to 30 cm (12 in) in length. Adriosaurus represents the first occurrence of vestigial limbs in fossil lizards, having lost its manus and forearm completely in order to elongate its axial skeleton. These unique anatomical features led to discussions of the evolutionary patterns of limb reduction in Squamata.

Adriosaurus includes three species: A. microbrachis (“micro”, meaning small, and “brachis”, meaning arm, referring to the vestigial forelimb composed of only the humerus), A. skrbinensis (named after the location where they found the fossil, Skrbina, northwest of Komen, Slovenia) and A. suessi. A. microbrachis lacks many crucial characters to be qualified for cladistic analysis.

== History and Discovery ==
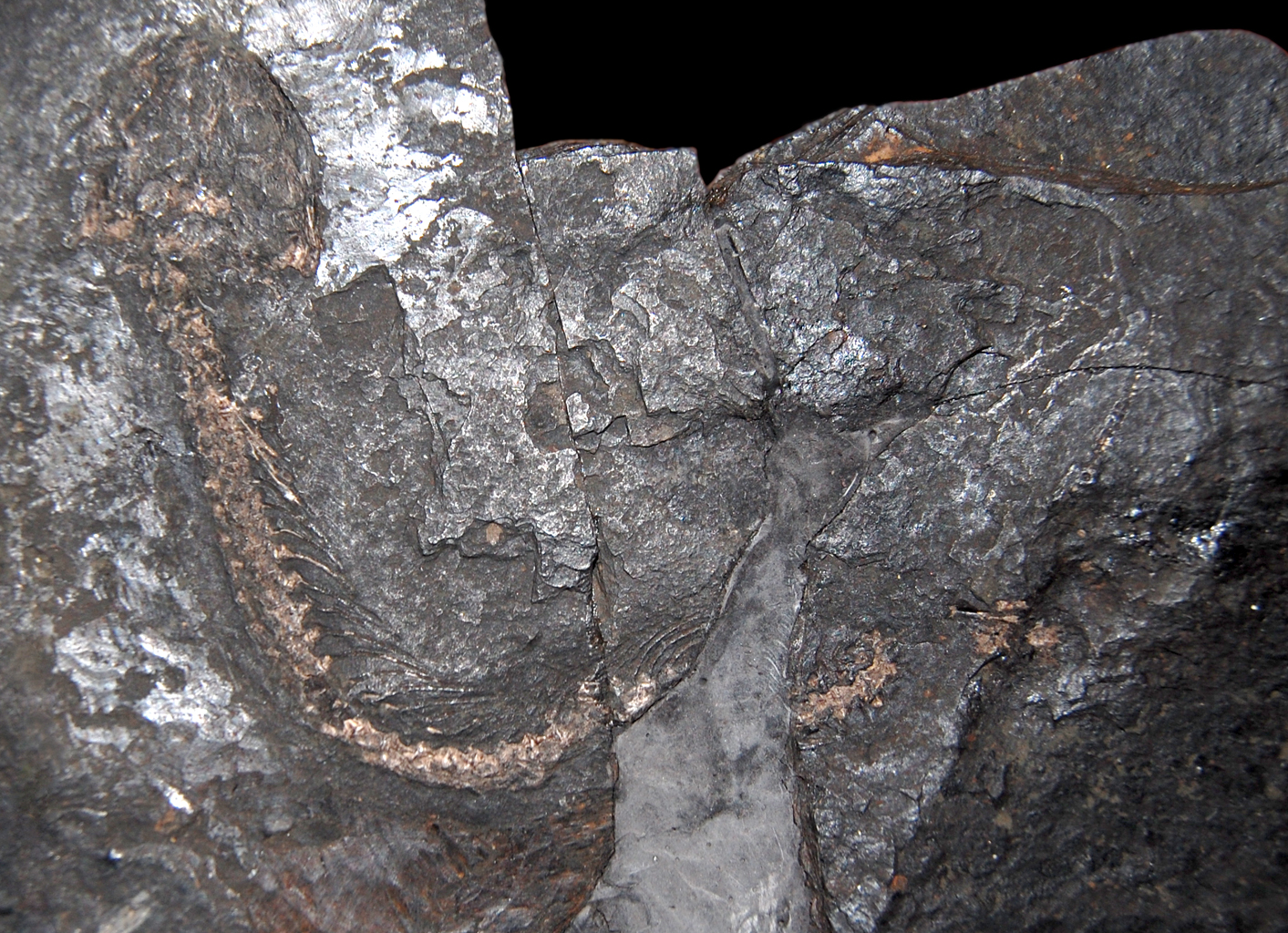
A. microbrachis

Adriosaurus was first described by Seeley (1881) based on a single specimen found near Comen, Slovenia. This fossil consists of the posterior half of the vertebral column, the pelvis and hindlimbs. Later Nopsca (1908, 1923) described a nearly complete skeleton from Hvar, Croatia. Nopsca's conclusions about the animals systematics were not accurate. In 2000, Michael S. Y. Lee and Michael W. Caldwell redescribed specimen NHMR2867, which is attributed to A. suessi. Four years later, in 2004, Lee and Caldwell went on to reevaluate Acteosaurus crassicostatus, a species that was then based on a small squamate fossil found in Comen, Slovenia. They concluded that this species is synonymous with Adriosaurus suessi.

In 2007, Caldwell and Alessandro Palci described a new species of Adriosaurus, A. microbranchis. The description was based on specimen MCSNT 7792, which consists of an articulated skeleton missing the skull and part of the cervical and caudal skeleton. They described another species of Adriosaurus in 2010. This new species, A. skrbinensis, was about 60% larger than the other two known species within Adriosaurus. The description was based on specimen SMNH 2158, which was also found near a small village in Comen, Slovenia. The specimen represents a relatively complete skeleton, with most of the skull, parts of the vertebrae, parts of limbs and pelvic girdle being preserved.

== Description ==
A. suessi was a small marine squamate with an elongated neck and body, with the type species (A. suessi) measuring 30 cm (12 in) long. It had 10 cervical, 29 dorsal, and at least 65 caudal vertebrae. Its bones exhibit pachyostosis, an anatomical feature that thickens the periosteal bone by increasing the osteogenic activity of the periosteum. Both its forelimbs and hindlimbs were reduced in size, which suggests that it lived in a marine environment.

A. skrbinensis was a small marine squamate with 30 dorsal vertebrae. Unlike A. suessi, A. skrbinesis had forelimbs which were much more reduced than the hindlimbs. It had a humerus/femur ratio of 0.40, compared to 0.61 in A. suessi and 0.62 in A. microbrachis. A phosphatic matter was recovered from its gastric contents, which probably represents the remains of small fishes. This suggests that A. skrbinensis was likely a piscivore.

=== Vertebrae ===
A. suessi has 10 cervical vertebrae, none of which exhibit pachyostosis. The neural arches of the cervical vertebrae are wide with both anterior and posterior lateral expansions. The neural spines extend vertically along the length of the neural arch. The shoulder girdle is placed after the tenth presacral and the following vertebrae connect to large, pachyostotic ribs. This has been used to infer that the distinction between the cervical and dorsal vertebrae lies between vertebrae 10 and 11. There are 29 dorsal vertebrae, with each being attached to large ribs. Compared to the cervical vertebrae, the neural arches of the dorsal vertebrae are much wider and more swollen. The dorsal vertebrae have less prominent transverse processes, and the ribs articulate with the body of the centrum. Most of the ribs are heavily ossified and pachyostotic. They are most ossified and thickened near the middle of the dorsal region, while the anterior and posterior part of the dorsal region appear to be less affected. The pachyostosis is most prominent in the proximal half of the ribs, with their distal half being less ossified. After the dorsal vertebrae, A. suessi preserves two sacral vertebrae. They are similar to the dorsal vertebrae, but lack ribs and are instead fused to the pelvis. 65 caudal vertebrae are preserved, with all of them possessing narrow neural arches. Transverse processes are present on the anterior caudals and gradually diminish in size posteriorly, disappearing around the 27th caudal vertebra.

For A. skrbinensis, 10 cervical vertebrae, 30 dorsal vertebrae, and 2 sacral vertebrae are preserved. The centrum of the dorsal vertebrae in this species presents a procoelous pattern.

== Classification and species ==
As a pythonomorph with reduced limbs, Adriosaurus is important in regards to discussions on the origin of snakes, a topic on which paleontologists and zoologists have long held different opinions. After the discovery of mid-Cretaceous snake-like lizards, paleontological research linked snakes to mosasauroid lizards which once lived in marine environments, while zoologists linked snakes to squamates with reduced limbs, which implied a terrestrial origin. The precise origin of snakes is still a subject of scientific debate.

Adriosaurus has three species: A. microbrachis, A. skrbinensis and A. suessi. A. skrbinensis and A. suessi are present on the cladogram below. The cladogram is based on Palci and Caldwell (2010a & 2010b):

- Anguimorpha
  - Anguidae
  - - - Xenosaurus
      - Shinisaurus
    - - Heloderma
      - - - Lanthanotus
          - Varanus
        - Pythonomorpha
          - - Aigialosauridae
            - Mosasauridae
          - Ophidiomorpha
            - Dolichosauridae
              - Coniasaurus
              - Dolichosaurus
            - - - Pontosaurus lesinensis
                - Pontosaurus kornhuberi
              - - Aphanizocnemus
                - - - Adriosaurus skrbinensis
                    - Adriosaurus suessi
                  - - Acteosaurus
                    - Ophidia

== Paleobiology ==
=== Locomotion ===
Adriosaurus mainly would have swum by using lateral undulation because of its laterally compressed body, flattened tail, and small limbs. The thicked parts of the middle dorsal region of the skeleton would have reduced swimming speed and maneuverability. Thus, Adriosaurus was a relatively slow swimmer. Its living environment most likely consisted of calm, near-shore environments. In this environment, the flat, distal regions of the limbs could have been used as paddles for slower swimming and maneuvering of the animal in aquatic environments. It could have also walked on land, but with its small limbs would only have been able to walk slowly. Most of the fossils of Adriosaurus have been found in Slovenia and were preserved in limestone.

=== Diet ===
Adriosaurus had sharp, recurved teeth and a large skull relative to its body size. These features indicate that it was a predator, though its swimming abilities were not excellent. This means that it was most likely an ambush hunter. Considering its small body size, it most likely would have hunted various small fish and invertebrates.
