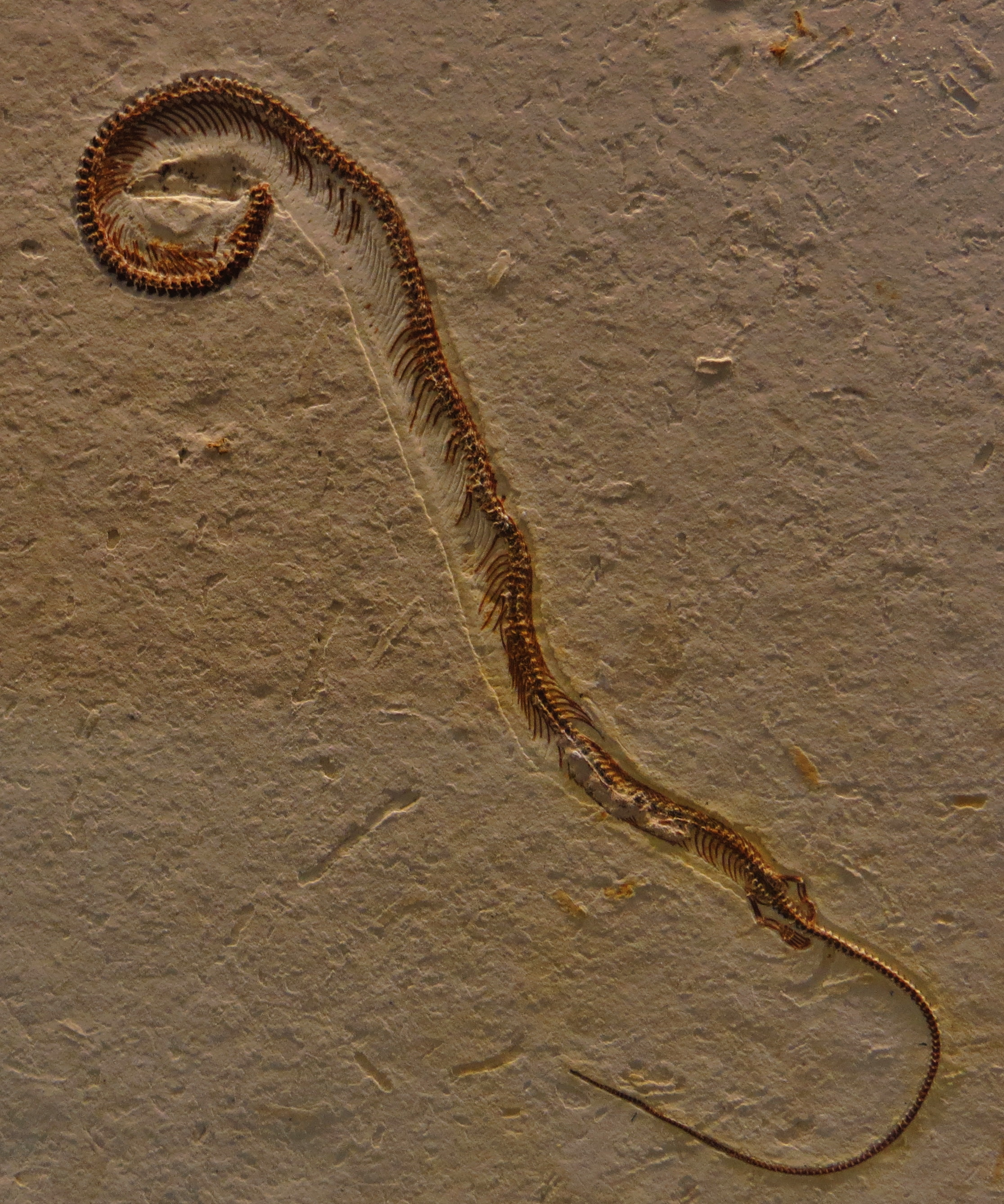
- BMMS BK 2-2; Bürgermeister-Müller-Museum

Scientific classification
- Kingdom: Animalia
- Phylum: Chordata
- Class: Reptilia
- Order: Squamata
- Clade: Toxicofera
- Genus: †Tetrapodophis; Martill, Tischlinger & Longrich, 2015

Type species
- †Tetrapodophis amplectus Martill, Tischlinger & Longrich, 2015

= Tetrapodophis =

Tetrapodophis Temporal range: Early Cretaceous, Latest Aptian, ~115–113 Ma

Extinct genus of lizard

Tetrapodophis (Greek meaning "four-footed snake") is an extinct genus of squamate from the Early Cretaceous (Aptian) aged Crato Formation of Brazil. It has an elongated snake-like body, with four disproportionately short limbs. The species is known from one fossil specimen.

Tetrapodophis has been considered by some researchers to be one of the oldest members of Ophidia, which is the taxonomic group which includes snakes and some of their closest extinct relatives. However, this classification has been disputed by some other authors, who recovered Tetrapodophis as a dolichosaurid, though the exact phylogenetic placement of Dolichosauridae is also disputed. Dolichosaurids may be related to Ophidia, which would mean that Tetrapodophis is indeed related to snakes, albeit more distantly than previously thought. Alternatively, dolichosaurids could be more closely related to mosasaurs, which may also be the closest relative of snakes.

== Description ==
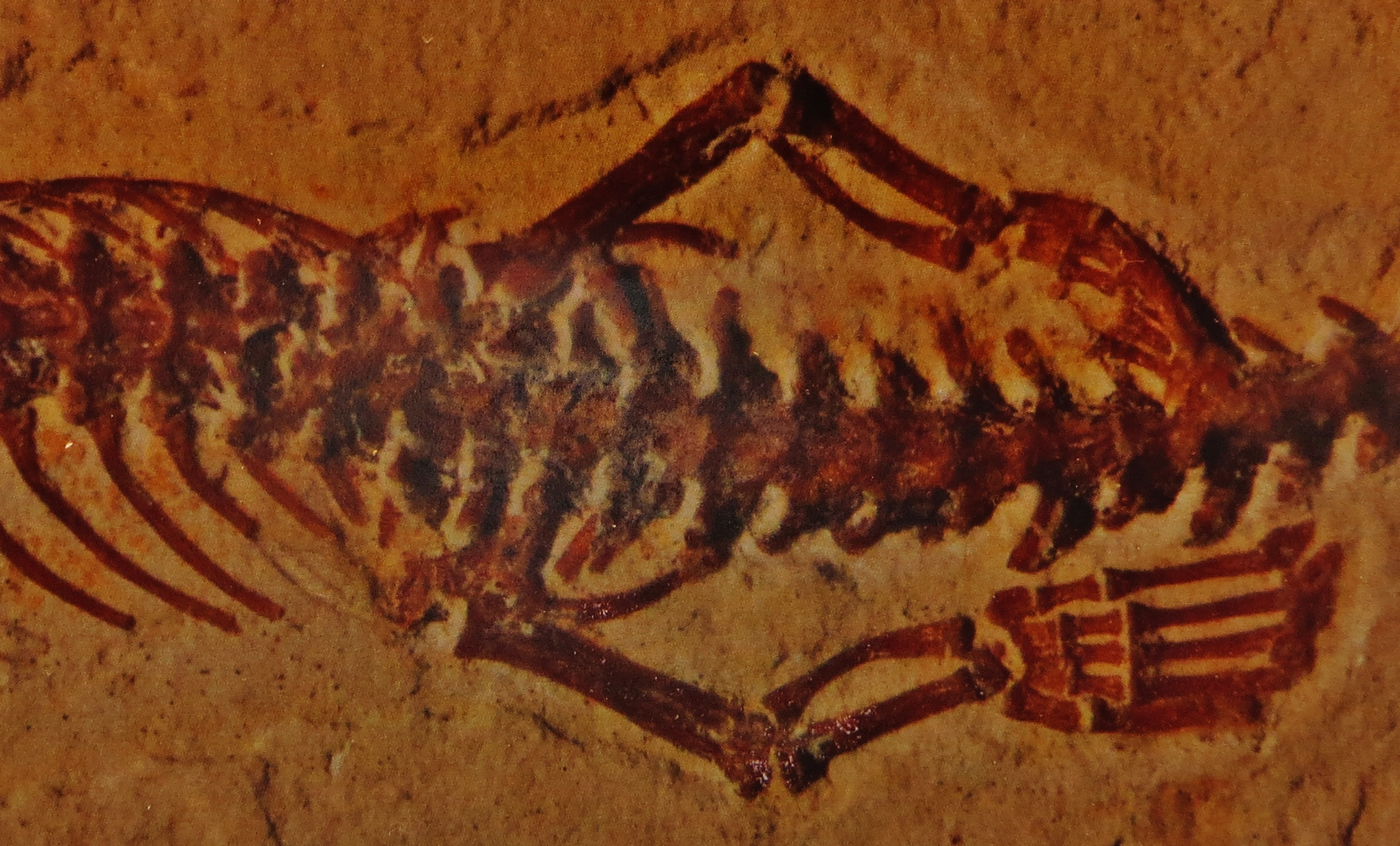
Hindlimbs

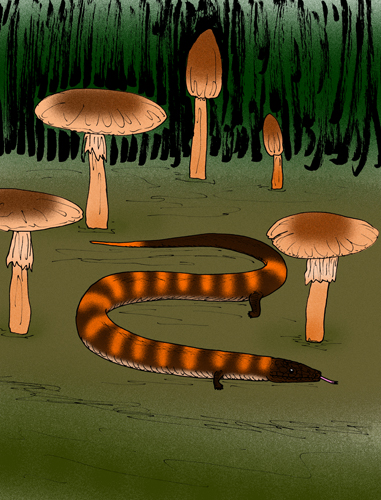
Life restoration

Tetrapodophis possesses small yet well-developed fore- and hindlimbs like a lizard and a long body similar to a snake, around 19.5 cm (7.7 in) in length. Nevertheless, it shares many characteristics with modern snakes, including an elongate body, short tail, broad belly scales, a skull with a short snout and long braincase, curved jaws, and sharp hooked teeth. The sole known specimen, BMMS BK 2-2, contains bones of another animal in its gut, indicating that Tetrapodophis was carnivorous like most snakes. Other features such as short neural spines suggest that Tetrapodophis was adapted to burrowing, lending support to the hypothesis that snakes evolved in terrestrial environments, though these features are also present in aquatic animals. The high number of vertebrae (upwards of 150) in Tetrapodophis and snakes is not seen in other burrowing reptiles with elongate bodies and reduced or absent limbs, meaning that it is most likely not an adaptation for a serpentine form of movement.

== Discovery and controversy ==
The type species, Tetrapodophis amplectus, was named in 2015 on the basis of a complete skeleton (the holotype; BMMS BK 2-2) preserved on a limestone slab and accessioned in the Bürgermeister Müller Museum of Solnhofen, Germany, which was labeled as "unknown fossil" until its importance was recognized by paleontologist David Martill when he visited Germany in 2012, when it was housed in a private collection in a private Solnhofen museum. The fossil had been in the hands of this private collector for "several decades" prior to the publication. While no locality information was provided for the specimen, the characteristics of the rocky matrix is similar to those from the Early Cretaceous Crato Formation of Northeast Brazil. Brazilian laws do not allow the removal of fossils from its territory since 1942, nor that studies on them be conducted without the participation of at least one Brazilian scientist. Due to a lack of information regarding the provenance of the fossil, it was possible that the fossil had been illegally exported from Brazil. This caused controversy among Brazilian paleontologists, and sparked a legal investigation by the Brazilian government. According to lead author Martill, fossils from the Crato Formation are widely illegally collected and exported from Brazil due to corruption in the country, and are found in fossil shops and museums all over the world; if current regulations were followed many fossils would simply be destroyed rather than collected.

The time when the fossil was collected is unknown; Dave Martill asserted in an interview to a Brazilian journalist that it was possible that the fossil was exported prior to 1942, but stated ultimately that he didn't "care a damn how [or when] the fossil came from Brazil", saying that it was irrelevant to its scientific significance. Martill stated that he was "critical of all laws that interfere with the science of paleontology; and blanket bans on fossil collecting are indiscriminatory and only hinder science ... They also lead to xenophobia -- Brazil fossils for Brazilians, British fossils for Brits. It should be fossils for all. No countries existed when the animals were fossilized." When asked why he did not include a Brazilian scientist on the study, Martill remarked that he was unaware of any Brazilian snake researchers when writing the study (though he later became aware of one following the controversy), which was followed with "But what difference would it make? I mean, do you want me also to have a black person on the team for ethnicity reasons, and a cripple and a woman, and maybe a homosexual too just for a bit of all round balance? … If you invite people because they are Brazilian then people will think that every Brazilian author on a scientific paper is there because he is Brazilian and not because he is a clever scientist." Martill would in 2020 remark that he felt his comments in the interview were poorly worded. Nicholas Longrich, a co-author of the study, remarked that he would like to see the fossil returned to Brazil.

Aside from the export issues, the fact that the specimen was in a private collection when described also caused controversy, and the owner of the fossil reportedly made it difficult for later researchers to study the specimen. In 2024, the fossil of Tetrapodophis, two dinosaur fossils and two pterosaur skulls were reported to have been donated to the National Museum of Brazil.

== Classification ==
A phylogenetic analysis published alongside the original 2015 description of Tetrapodophis places it as a close relative of other lizards, but outside the crown group Serpentes, meaning that Tetrapodophis branched off before the most recent common ancestor of all living snakes. Below is a cladogram from that analysis:

- Squamata
  - †Eophis underwoodi
  - †Diablophis gilmorei
  - †Portugalophis lignites
  - †Parviraptor estesi
  - - - †Tetrapodophis amplectus
      - †Coniophis precedens
    - - †Najash rionegrina
      - - †Dinilysia patagonica
        - - †Madtsoiidae
          - Serpentes
            - Scolecophidia
            - - - †Haasiophis terrasanctus
                - - †Euopodophis descouensi
                  - †Pachyrhachis problematicus
              - Alethinophidia

The interpretation of Tetrapodophis amplectus as an early fossorial snake was challenged by Caldwell et al. (2016), who considered it more likely to be a dolichosaurid squamate related to mosasaurs. A position supported by later analysis in 2018 and in 2021.

Cladogram after Caldwell et al. 2021:

- Anguimorpha
- - Iguania
  - Pythonomorpha
    - Serpentes (snakes)
    - Mosasauria
      - Tetrapodophis
      - - - Adriosaurus
          - Pontosaurus
        - - Aigialosaurus
          - Mosasauridae

However, a study in 2023 again supported its position as a stem-snake, finding it to be unrelated to mosasaurs.
