= Portunatasaurus =

Portunatasaurus Temporal range: Cenomanian-Turonian

Scientific classification
- Kingdom: Animalia
- Phylum: Chordata
- Class: Reptilia
- Order: Squamata
- Clade: †Mosasauria
- Superfamily: †Mosasauroidea
- Genus: †Portunatasaurus; Mekarski et al., 2019
- Species: †P. krambergeri

Binomial name
- †Portunatasaurus krambergeri Mekarski et al., 2019

Genus of lizards

Portunatasaurus ("Dugi Otok lizard") is a genus of mosasauroid squamate that lived during the Late Cretaceous period in what is now Croatia. It contains a single species, P. krambergeri, recovered from the Adriatic-Dinaric Carbonate Platform. It was a relatively small reptile, reaching 1 m (3.3 ft) in length.
