= Eidolosaurus =

Eidolosaurus Temporal range: 100–66 Ma Late Cretaceous

Scientific classification
- Domain: Eukaryota
- Kingdom: Animalia
- Phylum: Chordata
- Class: Reptilia
- Order: Squamata
- Clade: †Mosasauria
- Superfamily: †Mosasauroidea
- Genus: †Eidolosaurus

Extinct genus of lizards

Eidolosaurus was a genus of mosasauroid from the Late Cretaceous period of Slovenia.

== See also ==
- List of mosasaurs
