= Proaigialosaurus =

Proaigialosaurus Temporal range: Late Jurassic

Scientific classification
- Kingdom: Animalia
- Phylum: Chordata
- Class: Reptilia
- Order: Squamata
- Clade: †Mosasauria
- Family: †Aigialosauridae
- Genus: †Proaigialosaurus
- Species: †P. huenei

Binomial name
- †Proaigialosaurus huenei Kuhn, 1958

Extinct genus of reptiles

Proaigialosaurus is an extinct genus of semi-aquatic diapsid reptile. The genus was erected by Kuhn (1958), based upon skull fragments, which have since been lost.

Generally considered the oldest specimen of the lizard family Aigialosauridae, others have considered it to be a pleurosaurid, a marine sphenodontian (the order to which the extant Tuatara belongs).

Proaigialosaurus was discovered in the Solnhofen limestone formation of Bavaria, Germany. It was small (less than a metre long).
