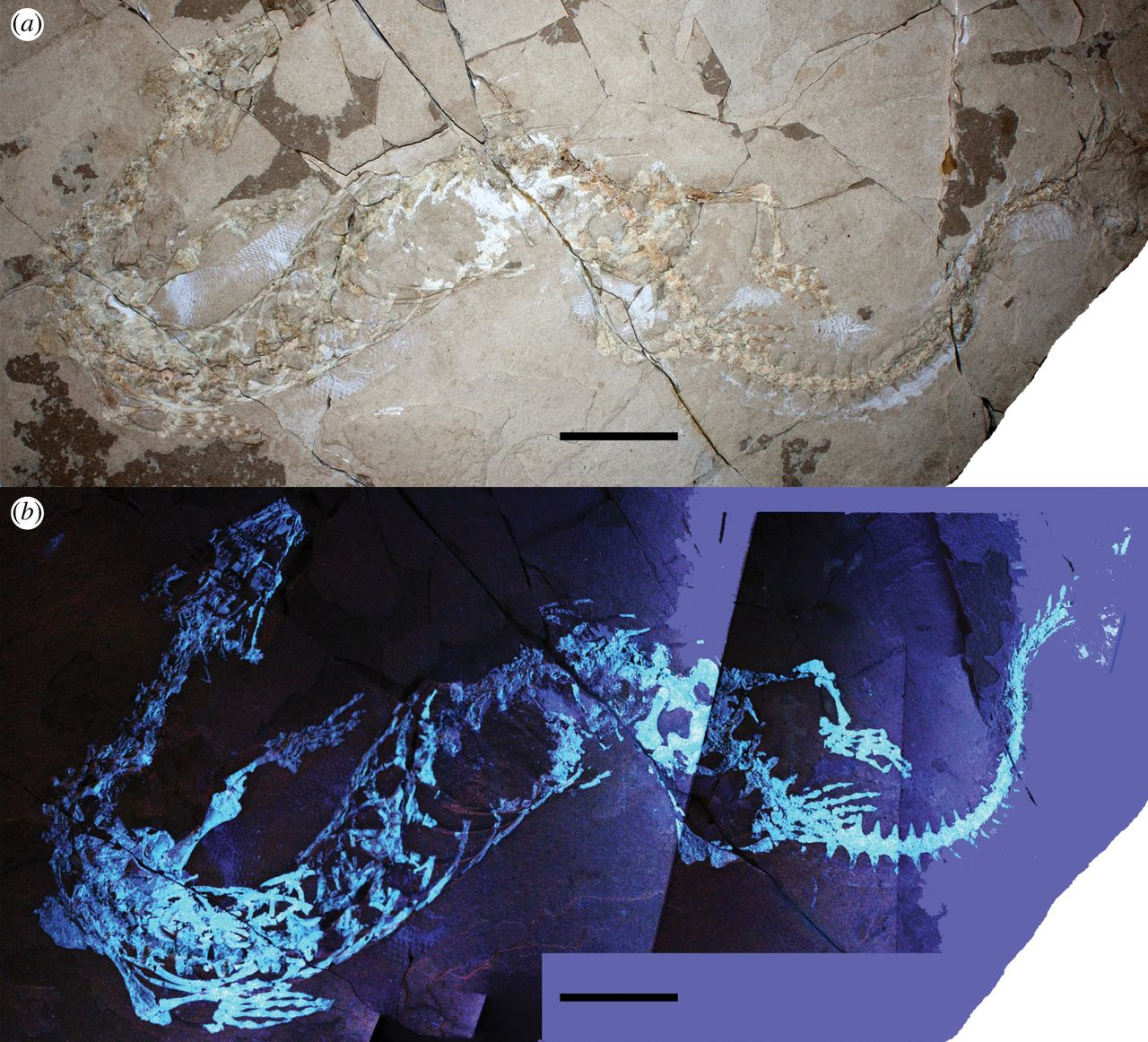
- MPUR NS 161, the holotype
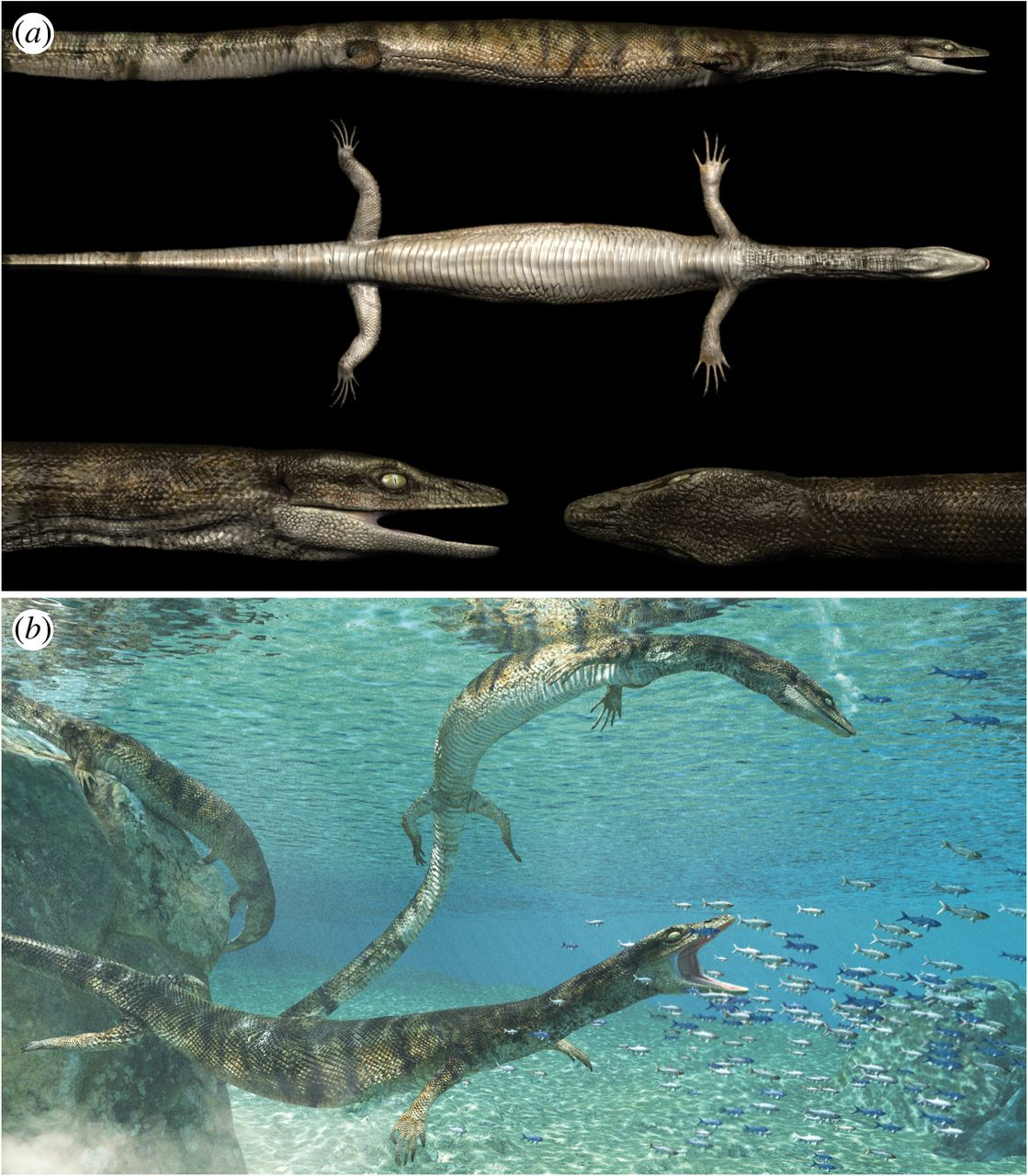
- 3D model (A) and life reconstruction (B) of Primitivus manduriensis

Scientific classification
- Kingdom: Animalia
- Phylum: Chordata
- Class: Reptilia
- Order: Squamata
- Family: †Dolichosauridae
- Genus: †Primitivus; Paparella et al., 2018
- Species: †P. manduriensis

Binomial name
- †Primitivus manduriensis Paparella et al., 2018

= Primitivus manduriensis =

Primitivus manduriensis Temporal range: Upper Campanian-Lower Maastrichtian

Extinct species of squamate

Primitivus manduriensis is an extinct species of dolichosaurid squamate that lived in what is now Apulia, Italy at the end of the Cretaceous period, from the upper Campanian to the lower Maastrichtian.

== Etymology ==
P. maduriensis is named after Primitivo di Manduria, a type of wine made using Zinfandel grapes.

== See also ==
- Apulia Carbonate Platform, where P. manduriensis was discovered
