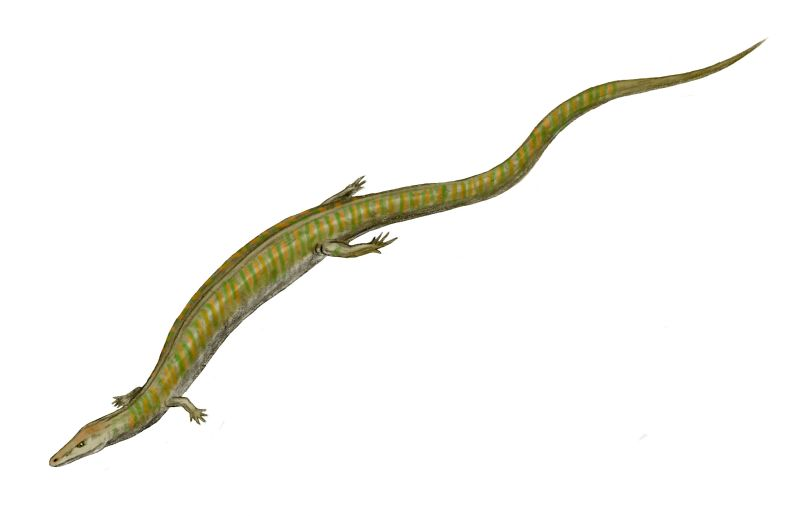
- Kaganaias hakusanensis

Scientific classification
- Kingdom: Animalia
- Phylum: Chordata
- Class: Reptilia
- Order: Squamata
- Family: †Dolichosauridae
- Genus: †Kaganaias; Evans, et al. 2006
- Species: †K. hakusanensis

Binomial name
- †Kaganaias hakusanensis Evans, et al. 2006

= Kaganaias =

Kaganaias Temporal range: Cretaceous Barremian

Extinct genus of lizards

Kaganaias (meaning 'Kaga water nymph') is an extinct genus of basal and oldest dolichosaur that lived in what is now Japan during the Early Cretaceous. Kaganaias was semi-aquatic and is the only known aquatic squamate from before the Cenomanian stage of the Cretaceous. It is also the first to be found in an inland area, instead of on the coast where aquatic squamates are commonly found. Its generic name is derived from Kaga Province, the old name for the Ishikawa Prefecture where the specimens were found, while the species name hakusanensis comes from the mountain that gives its name to Hakusan the city near its find site. The geological formation in which the specimens were found, the Kuwajima Formation, stands alongside the Tetori River and has been the site of numerous other finds including molluscs, dinosaurs, fish, and pterosaurs.

== Description ==
Kaganaias was small (roughly half a meter long), agile and had a long body. Like most of its semi-aquatic kind, Kaganaias had reduced limbs to aid in its aquatic activities. Kaganaias is known from two specimens; the holotype specimen was a partial skeleton, including numerous ribs, vertebrae and parts of the limbs and tail, whilst the secondary specimen had extra ribs and sections of the skull also, notably parts of the maxilla. The body of Kaganaias was both long and broad across the chest, but was predominantly flat. Despite being classified as a lizard, Kaganaias has numerous snake-like features. Sexual dimorphism may have been present in the species, but this is uncertain due to the paucity of data.

Kaganaias lived in what was a fertile, inland swamp-like region of Japan, possibly a large floodplain which was covered with water for most of the year. The fossil itself was discovered by a construction team preparing to lay down a new tunnel through a fossil cliff in 1997.

Kaganaias almost certainly moved through the water using a snake-like swimming motion, using its short hind legs to navigate. Kaganaias probably fed on other small vertebrates or molluscs which have been found in the surrounding area, but this has yet to be confirmed by the results of the examination of the fossil's faecal remains.
