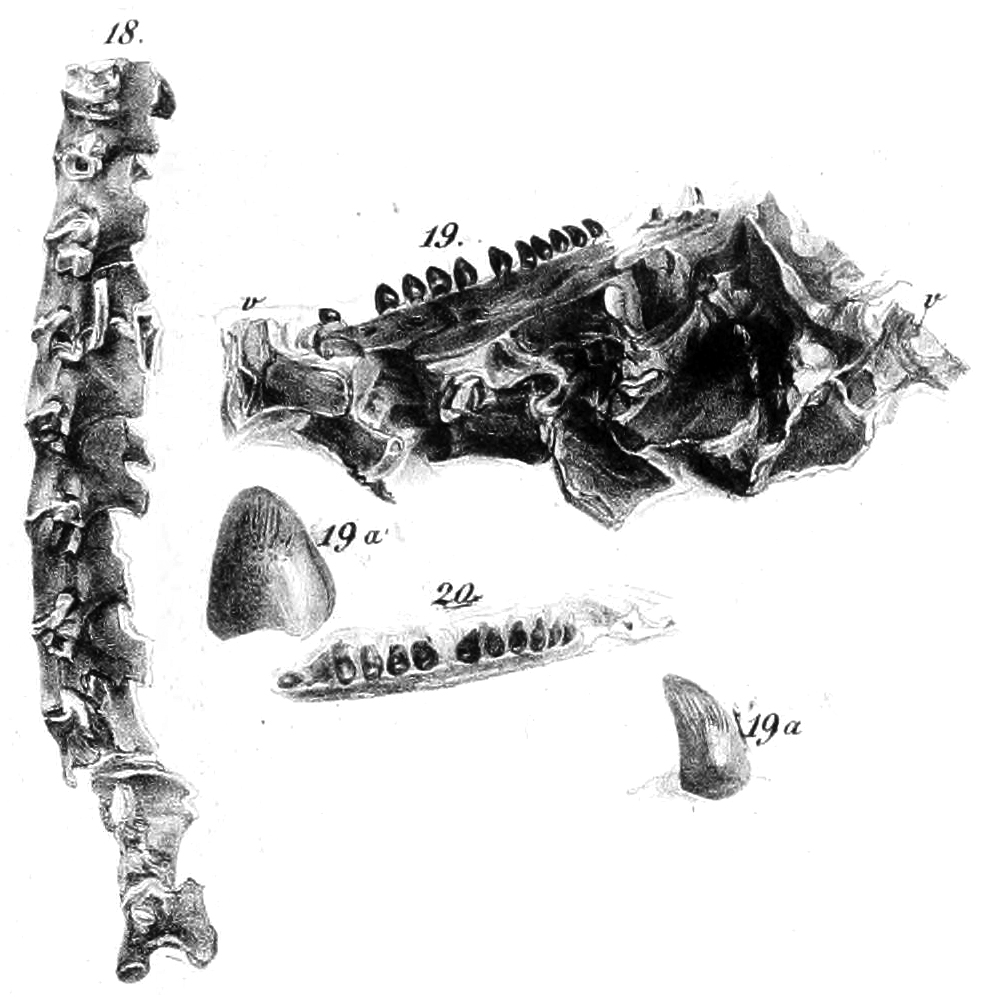
- C. crassidens holotype, drawn by James Erxleben in 1850

Scientific classification
- Domain: Eukaryota
- Kingdom: Animalia
- Phylum: Chordata
- Class: Reptilia
- Order: Squamata
- Family: †Dolichosauridae
- Genus: †Coniasaurus; Owen, 1850

Species
- †C. crassidens Owen, 1850 (type); †C. gracilodens Caldwell, 1999

= Coniasaurus =

Coniasaurus Temporal range: Late Cretaceous, 100–84 Ma

Extinct genus of lizards

Coniasaurus is an extinct genus of Late Cretaceous marine squamates that range in age from Cenomanian to Santonian. It was first described by Richard Owen in 1850 from lower Cenomanian chalk deposits in South East England (Sussex). Two species have been described from this genus: C. crassidens (Owen, 1850), known from Cenomanian to Santonian deposits from South East England, Germany and North America, and C. gracilodens (Caldwell, 1999) from the Cenomanian of southeast England.

Coniasaurus has only been described from incomplete specimens, but it is known to have had a relatively elongate skull with specialised teeth. By comparison with Dolichosaurus, it may have had four short limbs and an elongate neck and body. A maximum length between 0.5–1 m (1.6–3.3 ft) has been proposed.

Phylogenetic analysis suggests that Coniasaurus is a sister group to the Mosasauroidea within the clade Pythonomorpha.
