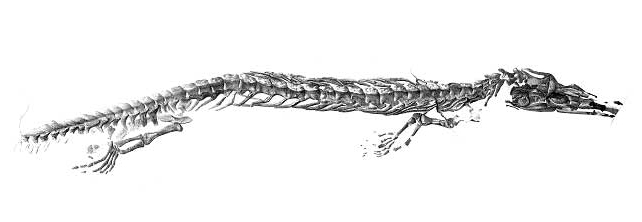
- Fossil of Aigialosaurus, an aigialosaurid
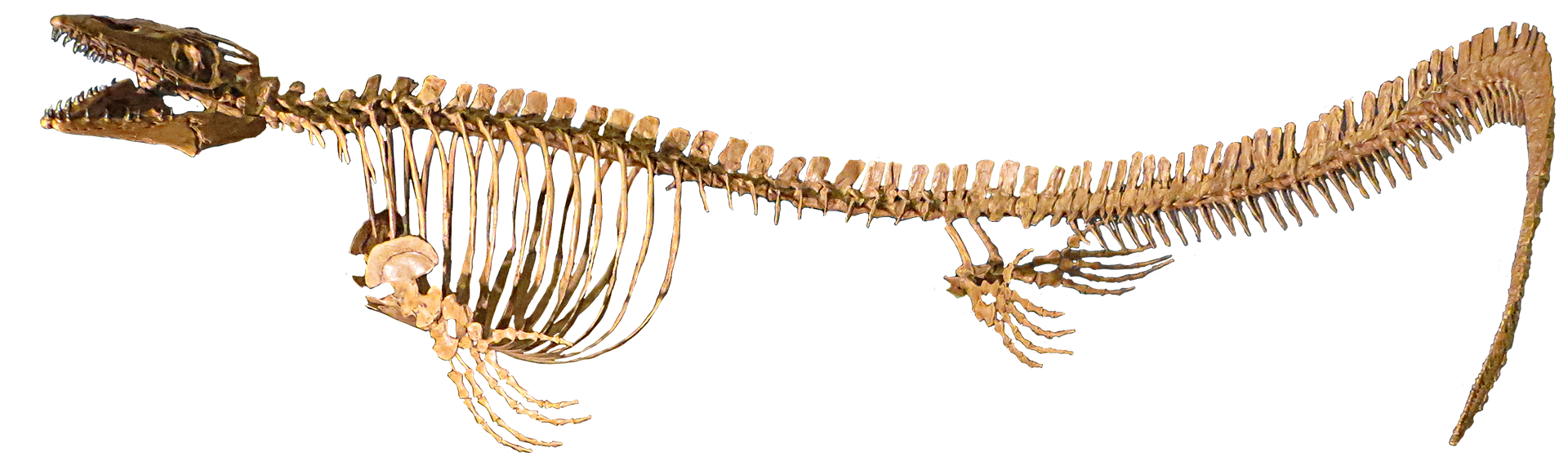
- Skeleton of Platecarpus, a mosasaurid

Scientific classification
- Kingdom: Animalia
- Phylum: Chordata
- Class: Reptilia
- Order: Squamata
- Clade: †Mosasauria
- Superfamily: †Mosasauroidea; Camp, 1923

Subgroups
- †Asprosaurus?; †Carsosaurus; †Haasiasaurus; †Komensaurus; †Mesoleptos; †Portunatasaurus; †Vallecillosaurus; †Aigialosauridae; †Mosasauridae

= Mosasauroidea =

Mosasauroidea Temporal range: Late Cretaceous, 98–66 Ma

Extinct marine lizards of the Late Cretaceous

Mosasauroidea is a superfamily of extinct marine reptiles that existed during the Late Cretaceous. Basal members of this group consist of small semiaquatic forms with terrestrial limbs ("plesiopedal"), while later members include larger fully aquatic paddle-limbed ("hydropedal") forms commonly known as mosasaurs. These were traditionally grouped within their own separate families, the Aigialosauridae and Mosasauridae respectively. However, phylogenetic studies have since found plesiopedal mosasauroids to be a non-monophyletic group, with some taxa nestled within the mosasaurids. Daniel Madzia and Andrea Cau in 2017 defined Mosasauroidea as "the most inclusive clade containing Mosasaurus hoffmannii and Aigialosaurus dalmaticus, but not Dolichosaurus longicollis, Adriosaurus suessi, or Pontosaurus lesinensis".
