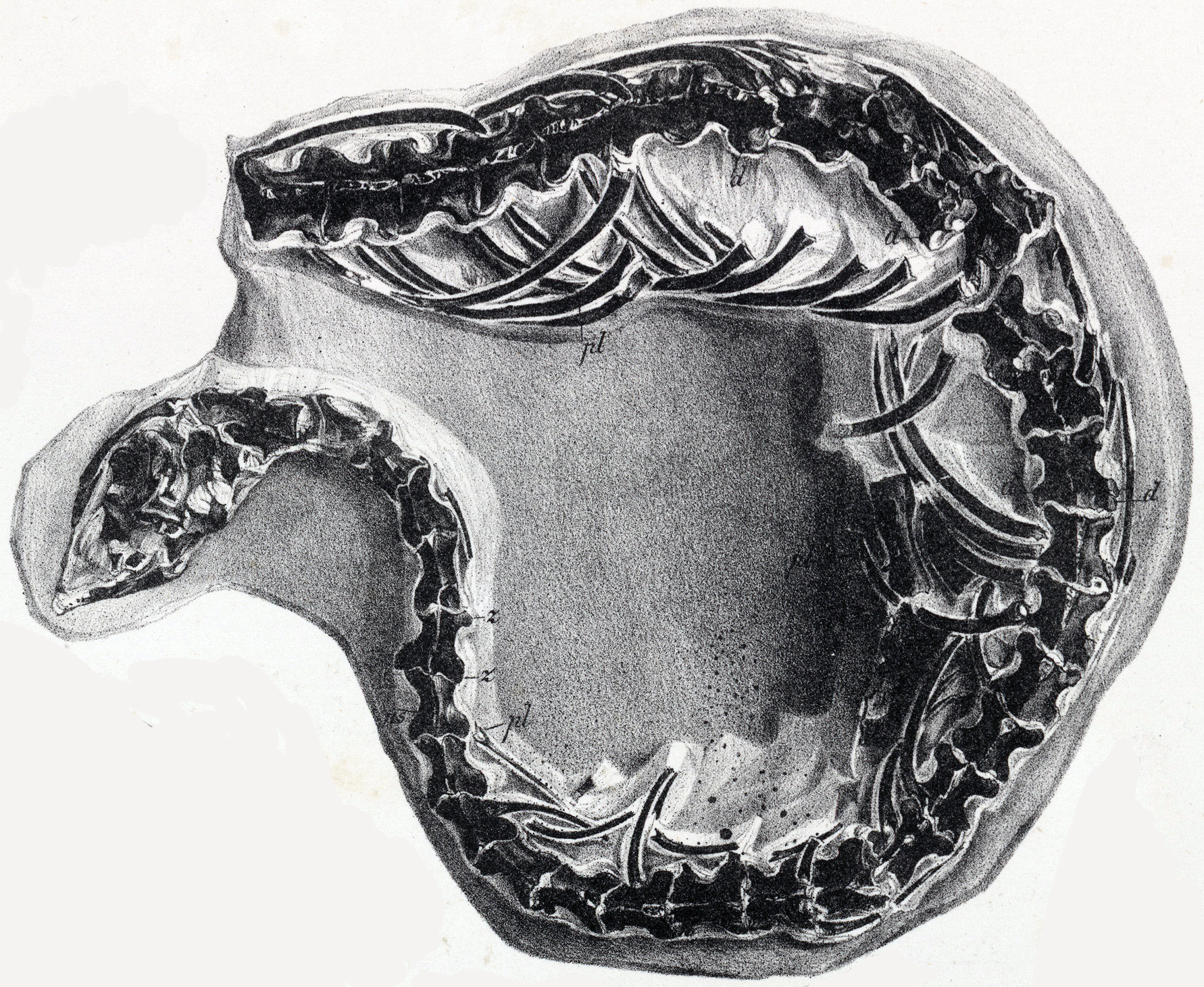
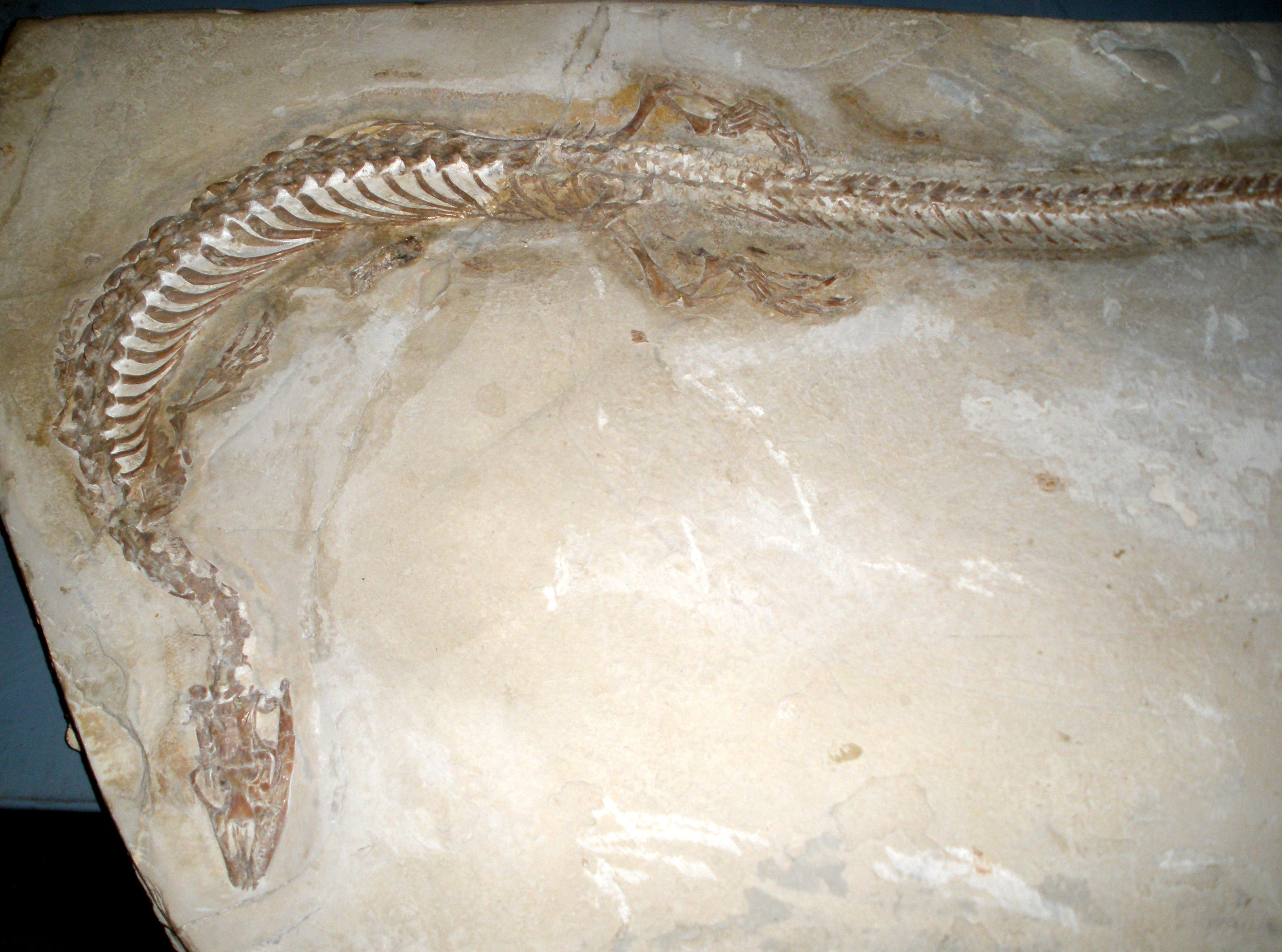
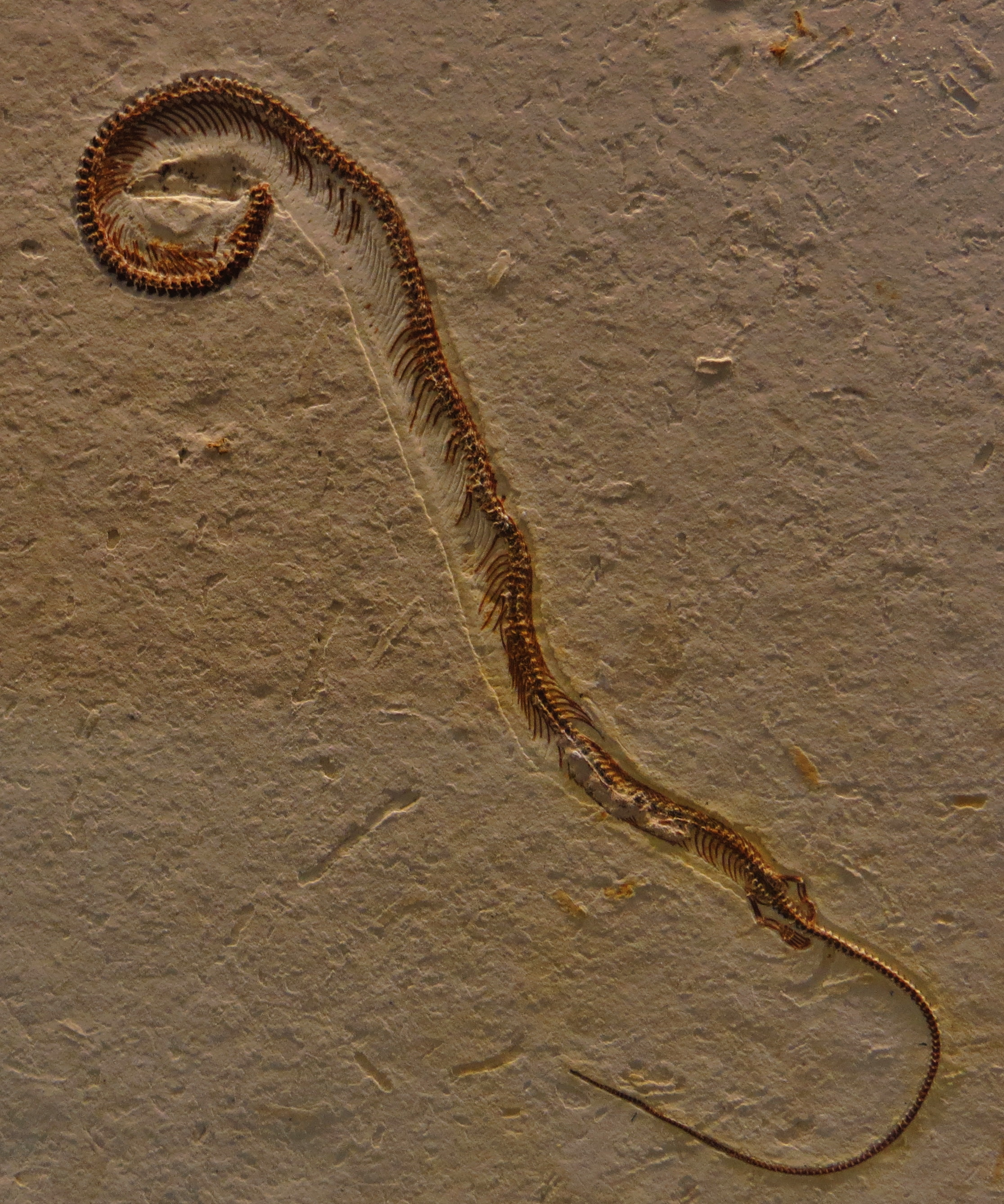
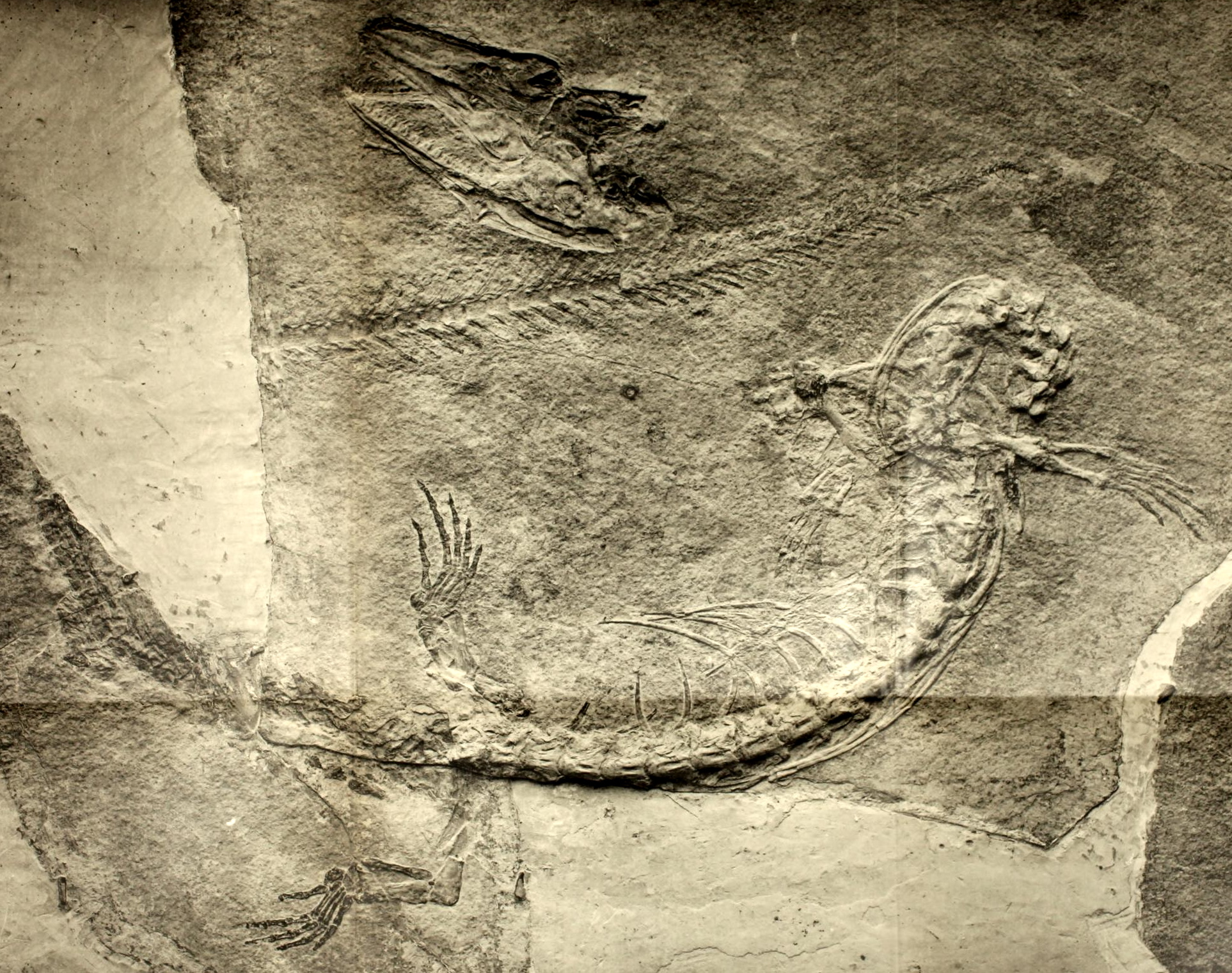
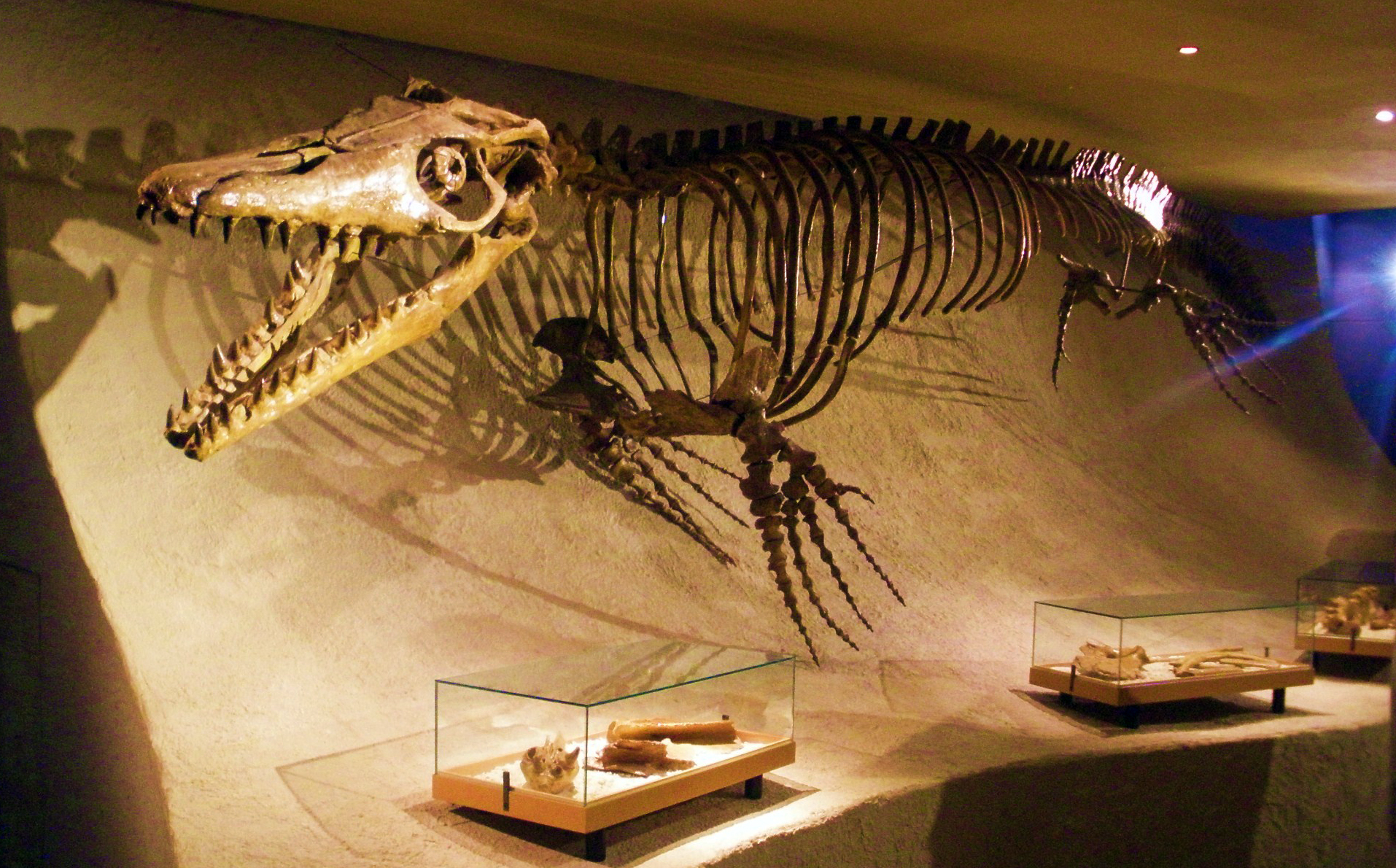
- Clockwise from top left: dolichosaurids (Dolichosaurus, Pontosaurus, and Tetrapodophis) and mosasauroids (Mosasaurus and Opetiosaurus)

Scientific classification
- Kingdom: Animalia
- Phylum: Chordata
- Class: Reptilia
- Order: Squamata
- Clade: Toxicofera
- Clade: †Mosasauria; Marsh, 1880

Subgroups
- †Dolichosauridae; †Mosasauroidea

= Mosasauria =

Mosasaurians Temporal range: Cretaceous, 121–66 Ma

Extinct squamates of the Cretaceous period

Mosasauria is a clade of aquatic and semiaquatic squamates that lived during the Cretaceous period. Fossils belonging to the group have been found in all continents around the world. Early mosasaurians like dolichosaurs were small long-bodied lizards that inhabited nearshore coastal and freshwater environments; the Late Cretaceous saw the rise of large marine forms, the mosasaurids, which are the clade's best-known members.

The clade is defined as all descendants of the last common ancestor of the mosasaur Mosasaurus hoffmannii and dolichosaurs Dolichosaurus, Coniasaurus, and Adriosaurus suessi. Its placement within the squamate tree is highly controversial. Two prominent hypotheses include the varanoid hypothesis, which holds that mosasaurians are most closely related to monitor lizards, and the pythonomorph hypothesis, which argues for a sister relationship with snakes. A third ophidiomorph hypothesis argues that snakes are members of the Mosasauria as modern descendants of the dolichosaurs, while a fourth stem-scleroglossan hypothesis considers neither group to be related to the mosasaurians.

Like other ancient marine reptiles, such as those in the orders Ichthyosauria and Plesiosauria, the genera in Mosasauria are not part of the clade Dinosauria.

== Evolutionary history ==
=== Historical debate ===
The specific placement of Mosasauria within the Squamata has been controversial since its inception, with early debate focusing on the classification of the mosasaurs. Cuvier was the first scientist to deeply analyze their possible taxonomic placement through Mosasaurus. While his original 1808 hypothesis that the genus was a lizard with affinities to monitor lizards remained the most popular, Cuvier was uncertain, even at the time, about the accuracy of this placement. He simultaneously proposed a number of alternative hypotheses, with one such alternative suggesting that Mosasaurus instead had closer affinities with iguanas due to their shared presence of pterygoid teeth. With the absence of sufficient fossil evidence, researchers during the early and mid-19th century had little to work with. Instead, they primarily relied on stratigraphic associations and Cuvier's 1808 research on the holotype skull. Thus, in-depth research on the placement of Mosasaurus was not undertaken until the discovery of more complete mosasaur fossils during the late 19th century, which reignited research on the placement of mosasaurs among squamates.

In a span of about 30 to 40 years during the late 19th to early 20th centuries, paleontologists fiercely debated the issue, which created two major schools of thought: one that supported a monitor lizard relationship and one that supported a closer relationship with snakes. The proposition of a snake relationship was spearheaded by Cope, who first published such a hypothesis in 1869 by proposing that mosasaurs, which he classified under a group called the Pythonomorpha, was the sister group of snakes. Some scientists went as far as to interpret mosasaurs as direct ancestors of snakes. Many opponents of snake affinities argued that mosasaurs belong among monitor lizards in Anguimorpha. Within that group placement varied, from placing mosasaurs within Varanoidea or its sister taxa, or as true monitor lizards within Varanidae. These debates spawned higher taxonomic groups that were erected in attempts to classify the placement of mosasaurs (although not all are compatible). One of these was the Mosasauria, initially a loosely defined group erected by Marsh in 1880 but redefined to its current definition by Conrad (2008).

In 1923, Charles Lewis Camp published Classification of the Lizards, in which he proposed through the review and rebuttal of previous arguments using his own anatomical observations that all taxa more closely related to Mosasaurus than Dolichosaurus should be classified into a superfamily called the Mosasauroidea, which would be a sister superfamily to the Varanoidea. Camp's take on the subject virtually ended the snake-monitor lizard debate for approximately 70 years, with nearly all subsequent studies supporting a relationship with monitor lizards. However, many studies continued to support going further than Camp in the monitor lizard relationship, placing mosasaurs within the Varanoidea.

=== Modern controversy ===
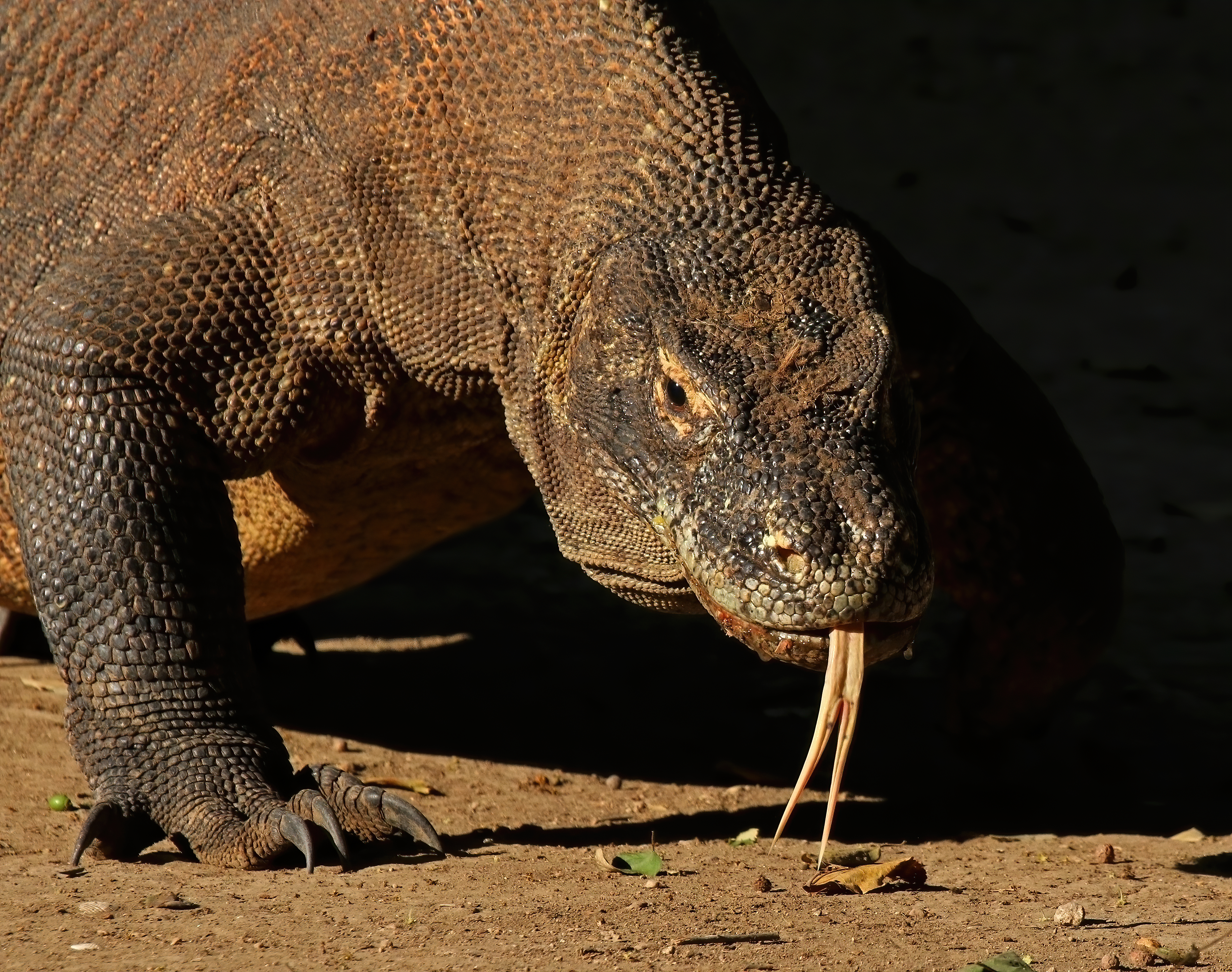
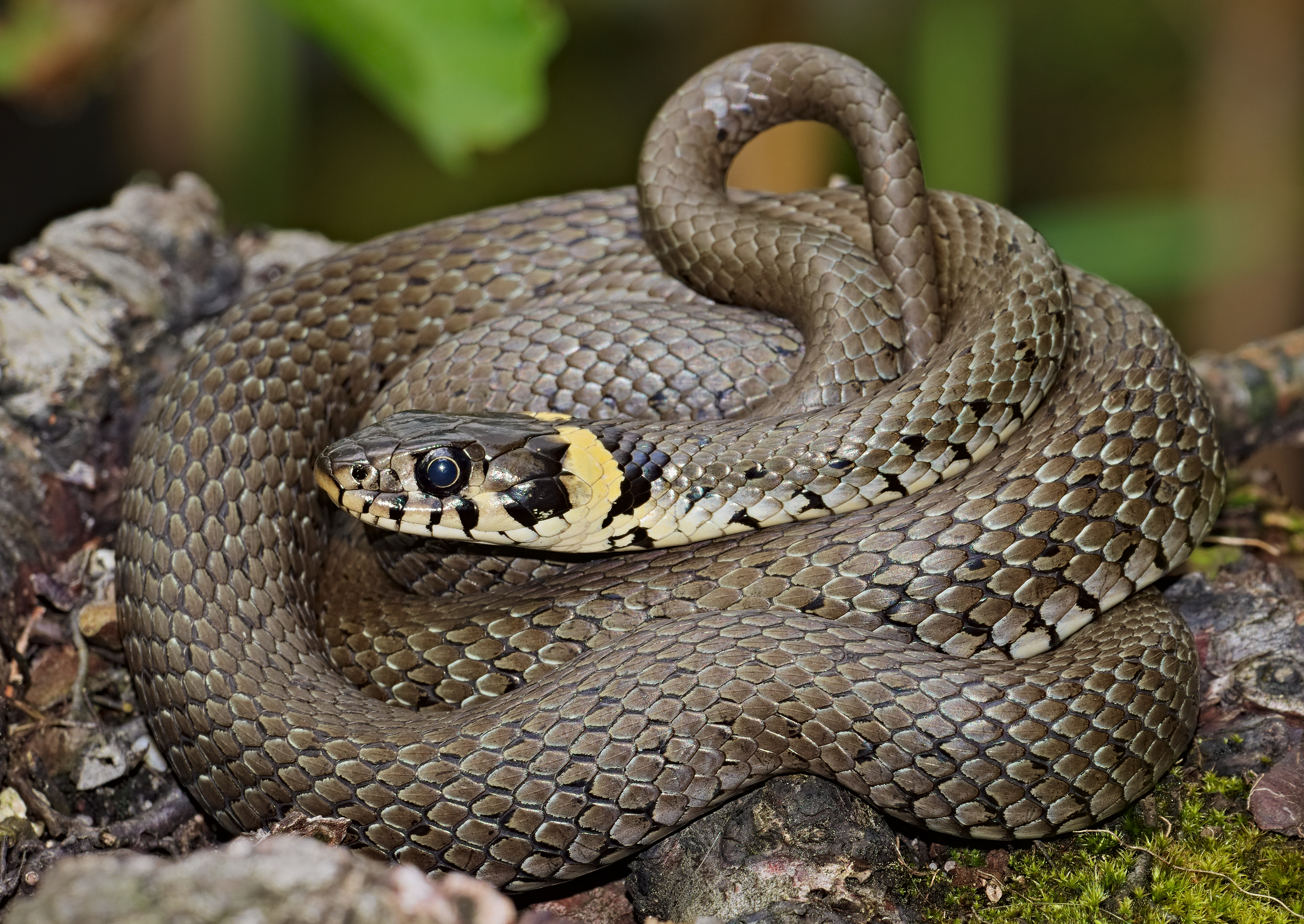
Scientists continue to debate on whether monitor lizards (left) or snakes (right) are the closest living relatives of Mosasauria.

The debate was reignited with the publication of a 1997 cladistical study by Michael S. Y. Lee, which recovered the Mosasauroidea as a sister taxon to the snake suborder Serpentes and resurrected the argument for a snake relationship. Prior, there had never been a modern phylogenetic study specifically testing the relationships between mosasaurians or snakes. Lee also resurrected the defunct Pythonomorpha and redefined it to unify the Mosasauroidea and Serpentes under one clade. Multiple subsequent studies conducted by scientists such as Lee, Caldwell, and Alessandro Palci refined this hypothesis, where in some, the Mosasauria clade was revived and repurposed. However, there still remained little consensus. For example, a large-scale phylogenetic study by Conrad (2008) recovered the Mosasauria in a polytomy, or a clade with unresolved relationships, with monitor lizards and beaded lizards; and a 2012 study by Gauthier et al. recovered Mosasauria as a clade basal to both monitor lizards and snakes.

With the advent of molecular genetics during the 2010s, some scientists argued for the combining of molecular and morphological data to examine relationships between mosasaurs and living squamates. An early study was Lee (2009), which based on nuclear and mitochondrial DNA in living squamates and morphological data recovered mosasaurs as a stem group to snakes, which some later authors interpreted as placement of snakes within the Mosasauria clade itself. However, a 2010 study by Wiens et al. attempted to replicate Lee (2009) using a larger dataset but instead yielded results that recovered the Mosasauria as a sister clade to the monitor lizards. The frequent discrepancies are due to the high prevalence of convergent evolution in squamates, which creates much room for interpreting molecular and morphological data; many of these studies had results that often contradicted each other, for example in completely different phylogenetic results by simply adding more datasets or varying which taxa are represented, which resulted in various conflicts creating even more uncertainty. Due to this, some scientists argued that a molecular perspective should be abandoned entirely. Nevertheless, other scientists have attempted to resolve these problems. One approach was utilized by a 2015 study by Reeder et al.: it closely integrated morphological, molecular, and paleontological data in a large dataset to overcome previous conflicts, which revealed new morphological support for molecular results that recovered Mosasauria as a sister clade to Serpentes. Another approach was developed by R. Alexander Pyron in a 2016 study, which also recovered Mosasauria as a sister clade to the Serpentes. A 2022 study suggested that many of the characters uniting snakes and mosasaurians were based on ambiguous or misinterpreted characters, and suggested that a close relationship to Varanoidea within Anguimorpha was the best supported hypothesis.

Zaher et al. (2022)
Varanoid Hypothesis

- - Other Squamata
  - - - Iguania
      - Anguimorpha
        - - Shinisaurus
          - - Heloderma
            - Xenosaurus
        - - Varanoidea
          - Mosasauria
            - Coniasaurus
            - - Pontosaurus
              - Mosasauroidea
    - Serpentes

Reeder et al. (2015)
Pythonomorph Hypothesis

- - Other Squamata
  - - - Iguania
      - Anguimorpha
        - - Shinisaurus
          - Varanoidea
        - - Heloderma
          - Xenosaurus
    - Pythonomorpha
      - Mosasauria
        - Adriosaurus
        - - Pontosaurus
          - Mosasauroidea
      - Serpentes

Caldwell and Palci (2010)
Ophidiomorph Hypothesis

- - Other Squamata
  - Anguimorpha
    - - Shinisaurus
      - Xenosaurus
    - - Heloderma
      - - Varanoidea
        - Mosasauria
          - Mosasauroidea
          - Ophidiomorpha
            - Coniasaurus
            - - - Adriosaurus
                - Pontosaurus
              - Serpentes

Gauthier et al. (2012)
Stem-scleroglossan Hypothesis

- - Other Squamata
  - - Iguania
    - - Mosasauria
        - Dolichosauridae
          - Pontosaurus
          - Adriosaurus
        - Mosasauroidea
      - Scleroglossa
        - Other Scleroglossa
        - Anguimorpha
          - - Shinisaurus
            - Xenosaurus
          - - Varanoidea
            - Serpentes

Cladograms illustrating the competing phylogenetic hypotheses between mosasaurians, monitor lizards, and snakes.

==== Pythonomorpha ====
Pythonomorphs Temporal range: Middle Jurassic – Holocene, 170–0 Ma
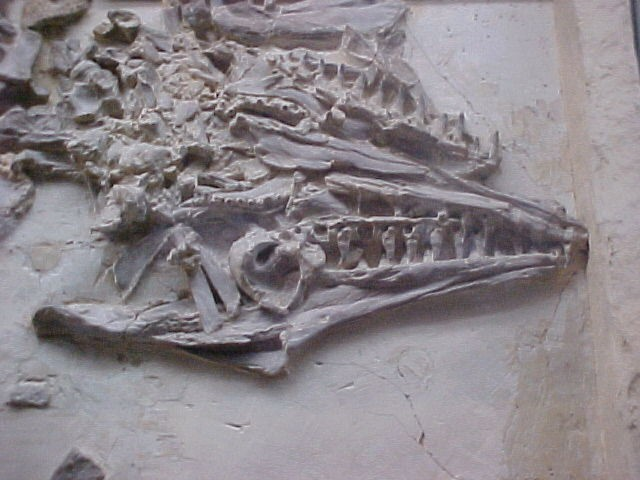
- Skull and jaws of Platecarpus, Peabody Museum of Natural History

Scientific classification
- Kingdom: Animalia
- Phylum: Chordata
- Class: Reptilia
- Order: Squamata
- Clade: Toxicofera
- Clade: Pythonomorpha; Cope, 1869

Subgroups
- †Mosasauroidea; Ophidiomorpha

Synonyms
- Toxicofera?

Pythonomorpha was originally proposed by paleontologist Edward Drinker Cope (1869) as a reptilian order comprising mosasaurs, which he believed to be close relatives of Ophidia (snakes). The etymology of the term Pythonomorpha comes from the Greek Python (a monstrous snake from Greek mythology) and morphe ("form"), and refers to the generally serpentine body plan of members of the group. Cope wrote, "In the mosasauroids, we almost realize the fictions of snake-like dragons and sea-serpents, in which men have been ever prone to indulge. On account of the ophidian part of their affinities, I have called this order Pythonomorpha." Cope incorporated two families, the Clidastidae (now defunct but including only Clidastes) and the Mosasauridae (including Macrosaurus [?=Tylosaurus], Mosasaurus, and Platecarpus).

However, a close relationship between mosasaurs and snakes was rejected by most 20th-century herpetologists and paleontologists, who sought, instead, to demonstrate a close relationship between mosasaurs and varanid (monitor) lizards and who generally considered snakes to have evolved from terrestrial, burrowing lizards (see, for example, Russell 1967). Cope's Pythonomorpha was later resurrected by a number of paleontologists (Lee, 1997; Caldwell et Lee, 1997) who had conducted cladistic analyses that seemed to show that snakes and mosasaurs may have been more closely related to one another than either were to the varanid lizards, and that snakes more likely arose from aquatic ancestors. As redefined by Lee (1997), the monophyletic Pythonomorpha consists of "the most recent common ancestor of mosasauroids and snakes, and all its descendants." This would include the aigialosaurs, dolichosaurs, coniasaurs, mosasaurs, and all snakes. Lee (1997) was able to show no less than 38 synapomorphies supporting Pythonomorpha.

If Pythonomorpha is valid, it contains not only mosasauroids but the Ophidiomorpha, which was defined as a node-based clade containing the most recent common ancestor of dolichosaurs, adriosaurs, Aphanizocnemus, and fossil and extant Ophidia and all of its descendants.

The validity of Pythonomorpha is still debated; there is no consensus about the relationships of snakes or mosasaurs to each other, or to the rest of the lizards. An analysis by Conrad (2008) placed mosasaurs with varanoid lizards, and snakes with skinks, while an analysis by Gauthier, et al., (2012) suggested that mosasaurs are more primitive than either snakes or varanoids. A combined morphological and molecular analysis by Reeder, et al., (2015) recovered Mosasauria and Serpentes as sisters, consistent with Pythonomorpha. A 2022 analysis found that mosasaurs were most closely related to Varanoidea, and stated that they "consider most characters previously reported as supporting the Pythonomorph Hypothesis to be problematic, because of incomplete fossil preparation, artefacts of taphonomy, limited comparisons, misinterpretations of anatomy, incomplete taxon sampling, or inadequate character formulation and/or scoring". Therefore, Pythonomorpha could be synonymous with Toxicofera according to the definition.

==== Ophidiomorpha ====
Ophidiomorphs Temporal range: Middle Jurassic – Holocene, 170–0 Ma
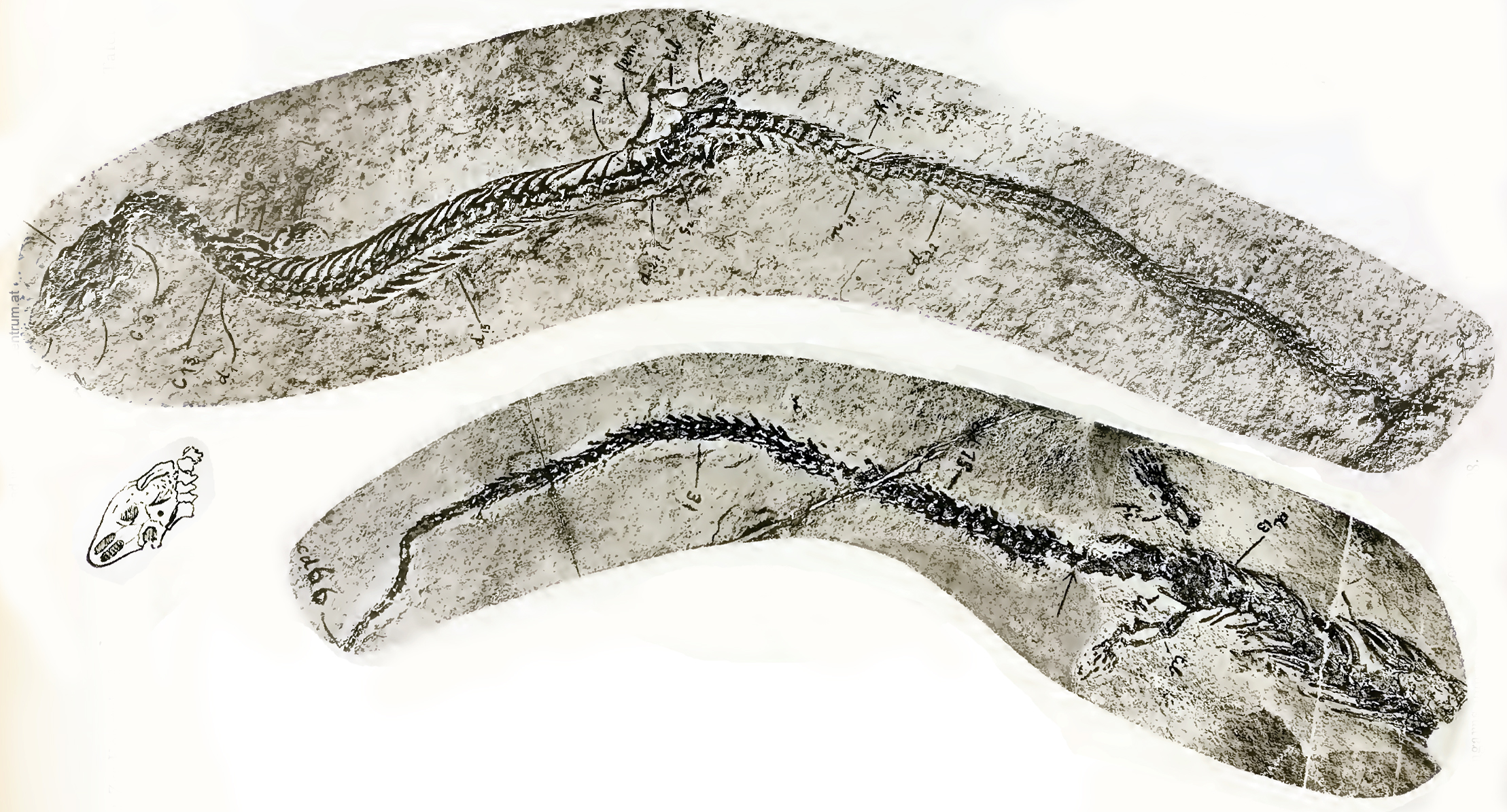
- Fossils of Adriosaurus

Scientific classification
- Kingdom: Animalia
- Phylum: Chordata
- Class: Reptilia
- Order: Squamata
- Clade: Pythonomorpha
- Clade: Ophidiomorpha; Palci and Caldwell, 2007

Subgroups
- †Dolichosauridae; Ophidia

Ophidiomorpha is a proposed clade composed of snakes and a number of extinct squamate groups. The clade was defined by Palci and Caldwell in 2007 as a node-based clade containing the most recent common ancestor of dolichosaurs, adriosaurs, Aphanizocnemus, and fossil and extant Ophidia and all of its descendants.

The existence of Ophidiomorpha as a clade is controversial, as it is placed within the Pythonomorpha (a clade that itself is not universally agreed upon containing mosasaurs and snakes, their most recent common ancestor, and all of that ancestors' descendants). Most 20th-century herpetologists and paleontologists rejected this idea and sought instead to demonstrate a close relationship between mosasaurs and varanid lizards.

Pythonomorpha was later resurrected by a number of paleontologists (Lee, 1997; Caldwell et Lee, 1997) who had conducted cladistic analyses that seemed to show that snakes and mosasaurs may have been more closely related to one another than either were to the varanid lizards, and that snakes more likely arose from aquatic ancestors.

Other authors have rejected the Ophidiomorpha hypothesis, finding that Mosasauria (including dolichosaurs) are unrelated to snakes.

== Sources ==
- Russell, D. A. (1967). Systematics and morphology of American mosasaurs (Reptilia, Sauria). Bulletin of the Peabody Museum of Natural History. Vol. 23. Yale University.
