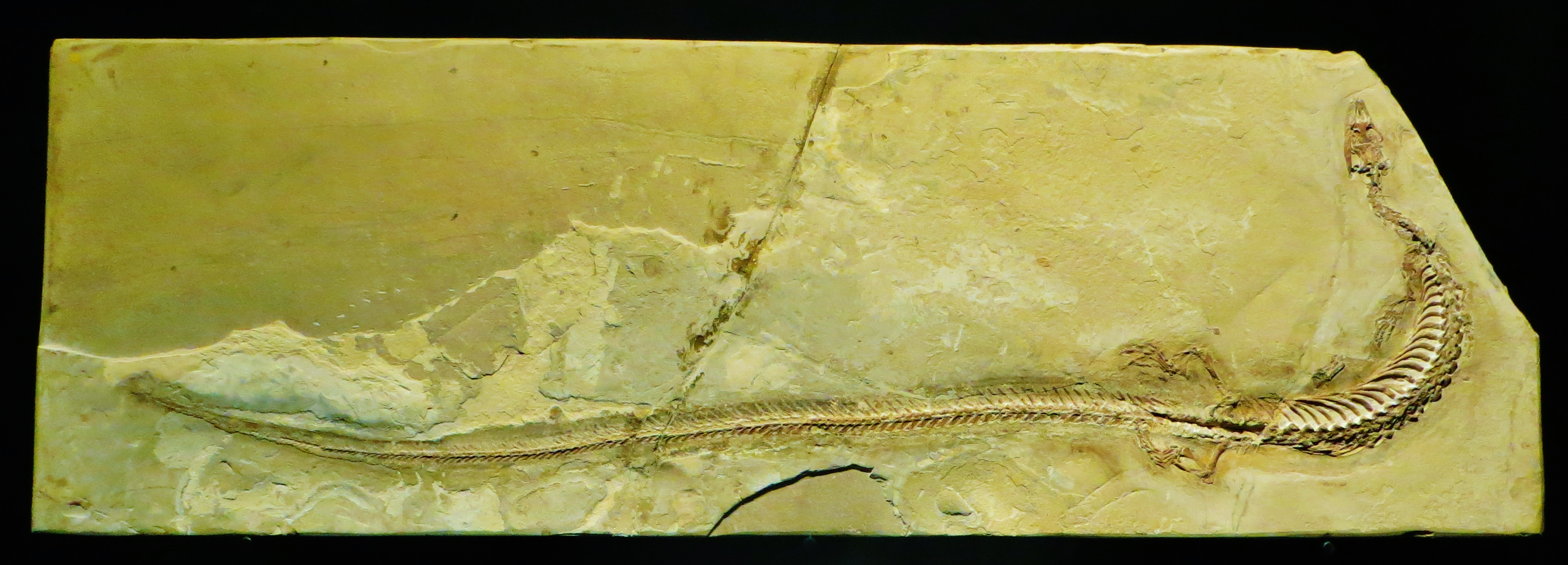
- Pontosaurus kornhuberi fossil

Scientific classification
- Kingdom: Animalia
- Phylum: Chordata
- Class: Reptilia
- Order: Squamata
- Family: †Dolichosauridae
- Genus: †Pontosaurus; Gorjanovic-Kramberger, 1892

Species
- P. kornhuberi Caldwell, 2006; P. lesinensis (Kornhuber, 1873 [originally Hydrosaurus lesinensis]) (type)

= Pontosaurus =

Pontosaurus Temporal range: Cenomanian

Extinct genus of lizards

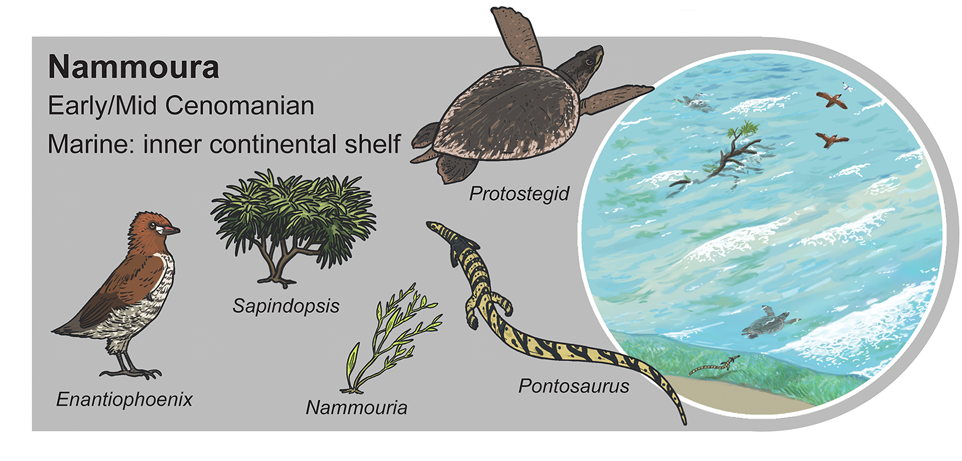
Flora, fauna and depositional environment of the Nammoura locality, including P. kornhuberi

Pontosaurus is a now extinct genus of pythonomorph from the Late Cretaceous period. The type species, P. lesinensis, is from Hvar in Croatia. It was originally named Hydrosaurus lesinensis and placed in the genus Hydrosaurus Wagler, 1830, which is preoccupied by the agamid genus Hydrosaurus Kaup, 1828, and now considered a synonym of Varanus, but later placed in a separate genus Pontosaurus. A second species, P. kornhuberi, is known from the Sannine Formation in Lebanon.

== See also ==
- List of mosasaurs
