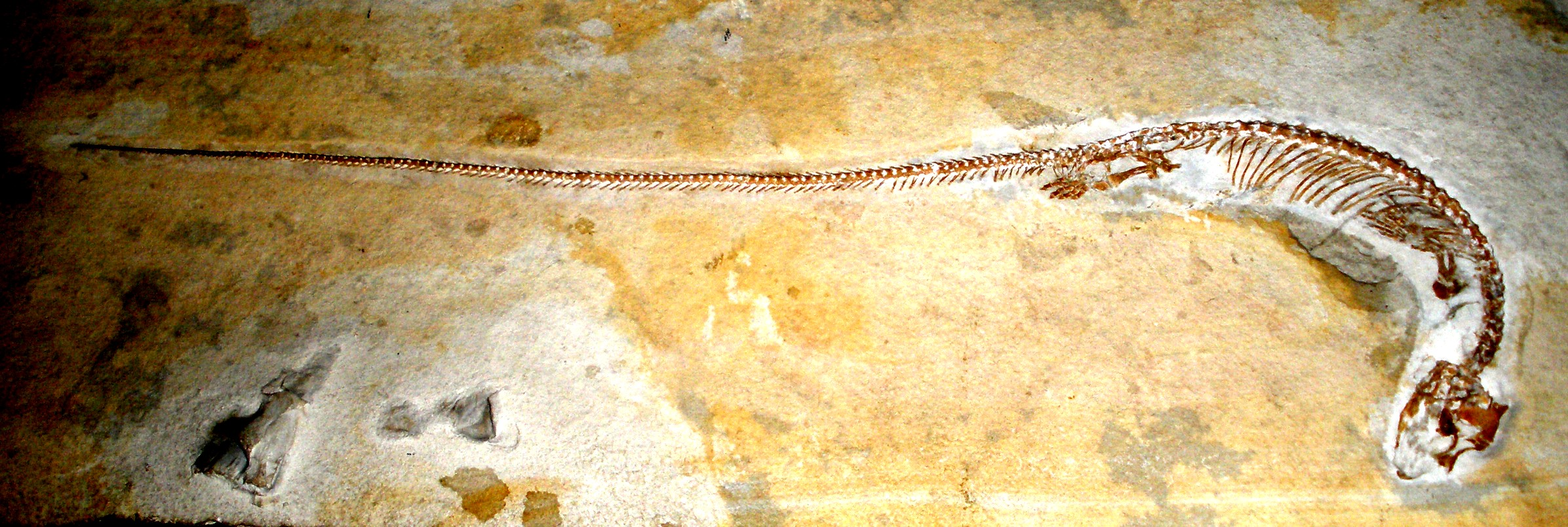
- Fossil of Aphanizocnemus libanensis

Scientific classification
- Domain: Eukaryota
- Kingdom: Animalia
- Phylum: Chordata
- Class: Reptilia
- Order: Squamata
- Genus: †Aphanizocnemus; Dal Sasso and Pinna, 1997
- Species: †A. libanensis

Binomial name
- †Aphanizocnemus libanensis Dal Sasso and Pinna, 1997

= Aphanizocnemus =

Aphanizocnemus Temporal range: Upper Cretaceous

Extinct genus of lizards

Aphanizocnemus is an extinct genus of lizard from Lebanon. It is a marine lizard that lived during the Late Cretaceous. It is often classified in the family Dolichosauridae as a close relative of snakes, although some studies have placed it as an even closer relative to snakes than dolichosaurids. Only one species of Aphanizocnemus is known, the type species A. libanensis. A. libanensis was named in 1997 on the basis of a single complete skeleton. Although the type locality is unknown, it is said to "almost certainly" originate from the Sannine Formation.

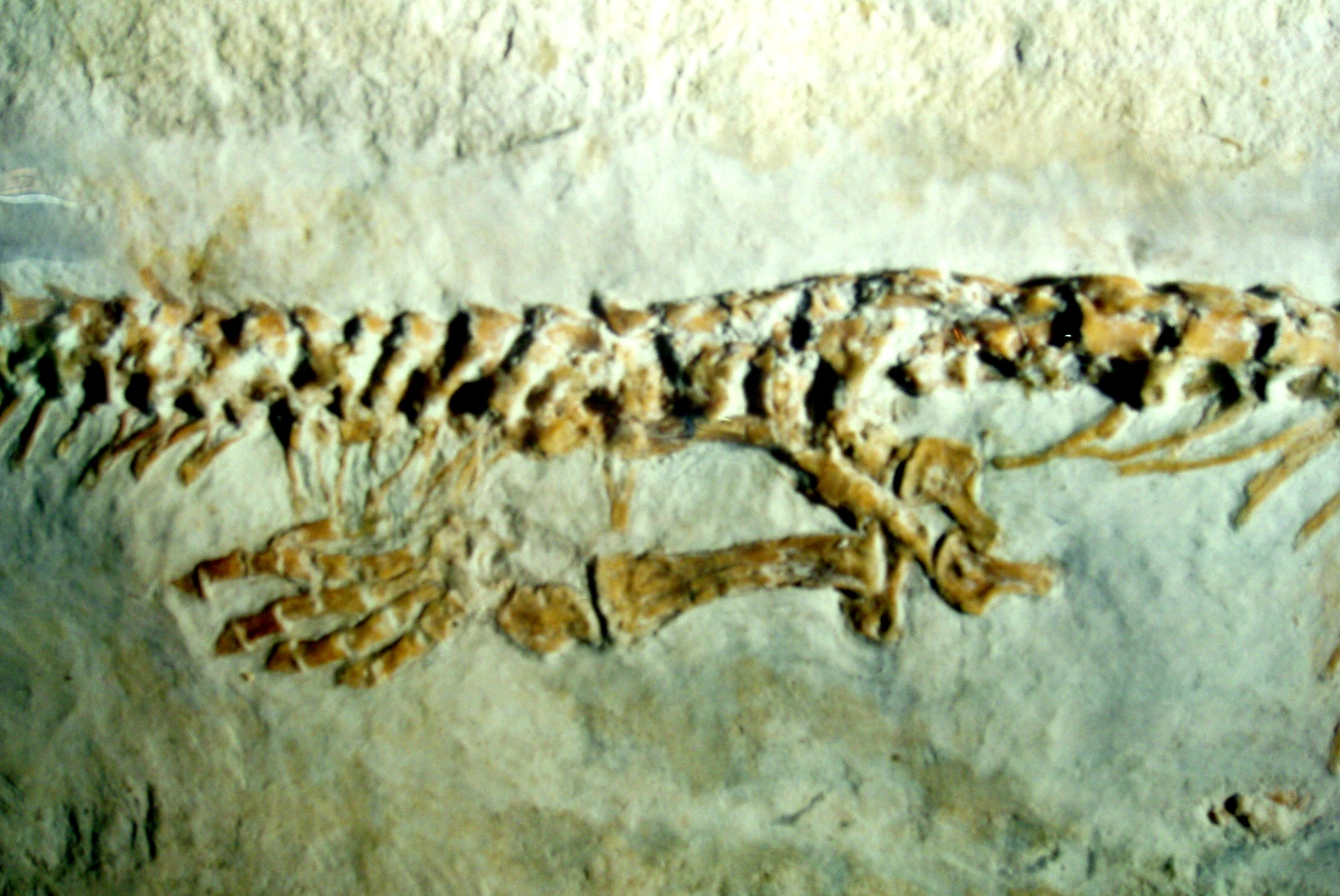
The hindlimb of Aphanizocnemus libanensis

Aphanizocnemus is about 30 centimetres (12 in) long, and the tail makes up half of its length. The hands and feet are very large in comparison to the limb bones. The flattened shape of the phalanges, or finger bones, suggests that the limbs of Aphanizocnemus formed paddles. Long projections of bone in the tail called chevrons give the tail a flattened, paddle-like shape. Aphanizocnemus was well adapted for an aquatic lifestyle, and probably spent much of its time swimming at the bottom of shallow lagoons.
