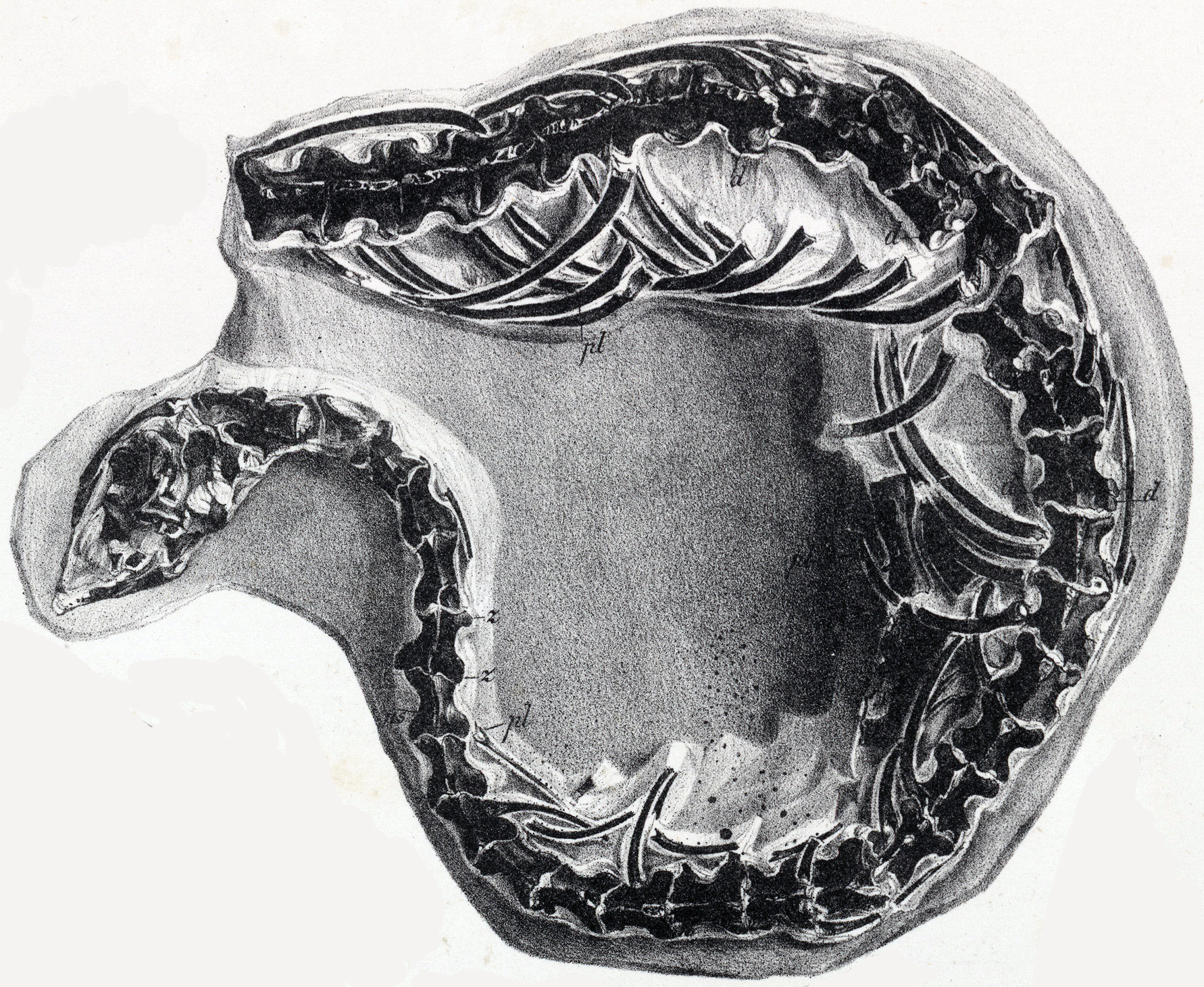
- The holotype specimen (NHMUK PV OR 49002)

Scientific classification
- Kingdom: Animalia
- Phylum: Chordata
- Class: Reptilia
- Order: Squamata
- Family: †Dolichosauridae
- Genus: †Dolichosaurus; Owen, 1850

Species
- D. longicollis Owen, 1850 (type)

= Dolichosaurus =

Dolichosaurus Temporal range: Upper Cretaceous

Extinct genus of lizards

Dolichosaurus (meaning "long lizard") is an extinct genus of marine squamate of the Upper Cretaceous Cenomanian chalk deposits of England. It was found by Mary Hone Smith and described and named by Owen in 1850. It is a member of the family Dolichosauridae. It was a small reptile measuring 0.5–1 m (1.6–3.3 ft) long. It had an elongate neck resulting from an increased number of cervical vertebrae.
