= Brodec =

Brodec may refer to:

Czech Republic

- Brodec (Louny District)

North Macedonia

- Brodec, Gostivar
- Brodec, Tetovo
