= Štirovica =

Štirovica Штировица Shtirovicë
- Village
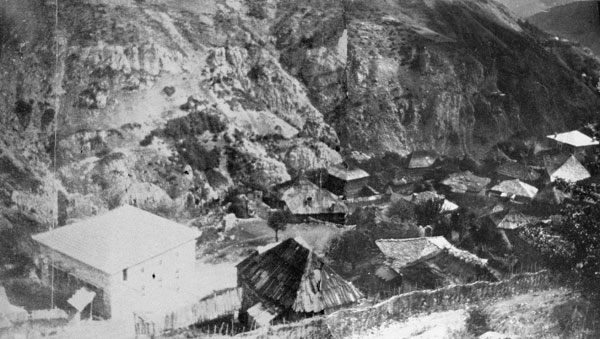
- Štirovica, 1907

- Location within Macedonia
- Coordinates: 41.788889°N 20.631944°E
- Country: North Macedonia
- Region: Polog
- Municipality: Gostivar

Population (2002)
  - Total: 0
  - Density: 2.22/km^{2} (5.74/sq mi)
- Time zone: UTC+1 (CET)
  - Summer (DST): UTC+2 (CEST)
- Car plates: GV
- Website: .

Štirovica (Macedonian: Штировица; Albanian: Shtirovicë) is a historical village located within the boundaries of the present-day village of Brodec in the municipality of Gostivar, North Macedonia. It is part of the region of Upper Reka.

== History ==
Štirovica (Shterovica) appears in the Ottoman defter of 1467 as a village in the ziamet of Reka which was under the authority of Karagöz Bey. The village had a total of 11 households and the anthroponymy recorded depicts a predominantly Albanian character.

According to Ethnography of the Adrianople, Monastir and Salonika vilayets, Štirovica in 1873 had 100 households with 235 Albanian Muslims. In statistics gathered by Vasil Kanchov in 1900, the village was inhabited by 400 Muslim Albanians.

Due to uprisings in the Upper Reka region, Štirovica was burned down by Serbian, and Bulgarian forces between 1912 and 1916.

== Notable people ==
- Bajazid Doda, ethnographic writer and photographer

== Gallery ==
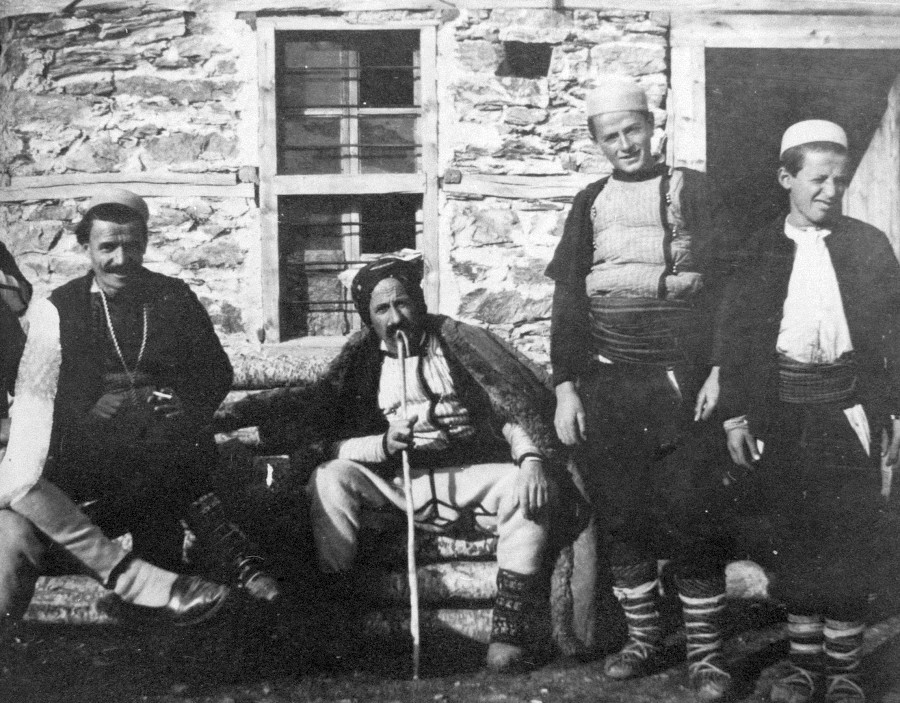
Shepherds from Štirovica

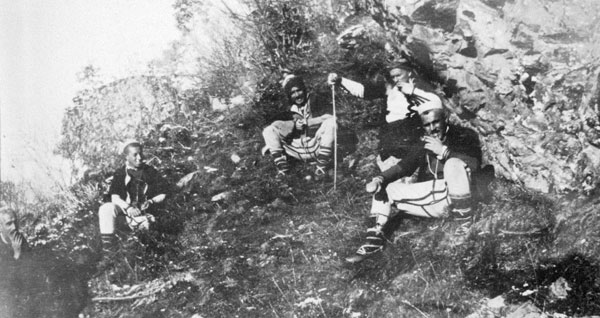
Residents of Štirovica on a hillside

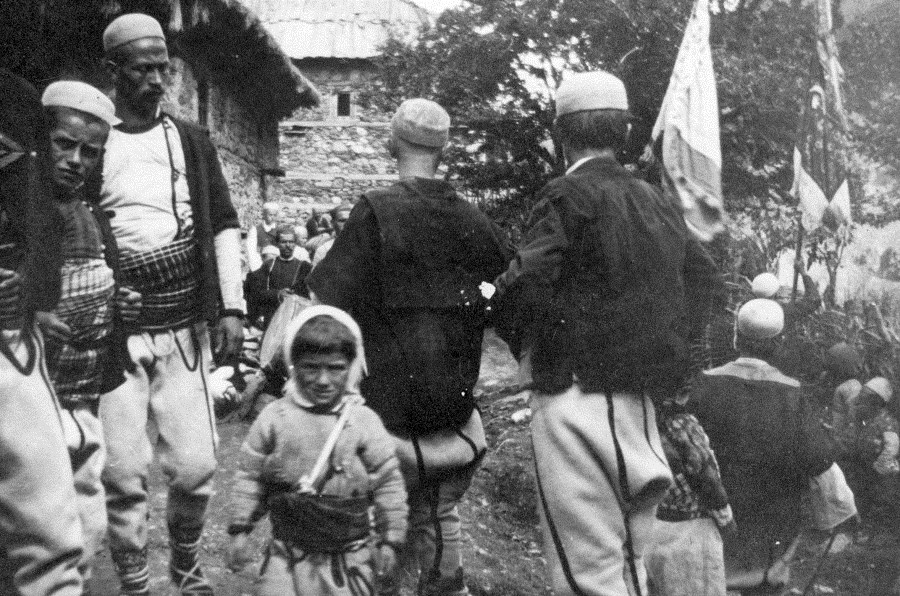
Wedding guests in Štirovica

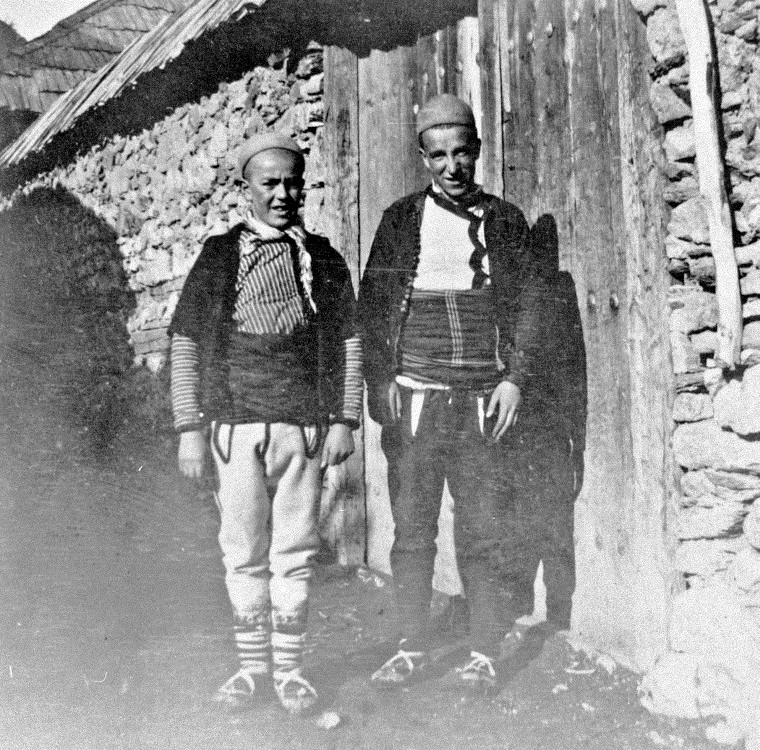
2 boys from Štirovica showing their opinga
