= Haasiophis =

Haasiophis Temporal range: 99.6–93.5 Ma Late Cretaceous

Scientific classification
- Kingdom: Animalia
- Phylum: Chordata
- Class: Reptilia
- Order: Squamata
- Suborder: Serpentes
- Family: †Simoliophiidae
- Genus: †Haasiophis
- Species: †H. terrasanctus

Binomial name
- †Haasiophis terrasanctus Tchernov et al., 2000

Extinct genus of snakes

Haasiophis, consisting of the sole species Haasiophis terrasanctus, is an extinct genus of snakes with hind limbs. It is one of three genera of Cenomanian snakes known to have possessed hindlimbs.

== Etymology ==
The genus was named in honor of the late paleontologist Georg Haas, who first began work in the fossils of Ein Yabrud and started the description of the genus before he died, plus the Greek "ophis", for snake . The specific names is from the Latin "terrasanctus" meaning "of the holy land".

== Specimen material ==
H. terrasanctus is known from a single fossil discovered at Ein Yabrud in the Judean hills, near Ramallah, 20 km north of Jerusalem, in the central West Bank. This site also produced the type and only specimen for the sister genus Pachyrhachis. This site is a limestone carbonate which deposited in a low-energy marine platform environment. The only known specimen of H. terrasanctus, housed in the collections of the Hebrew University of Jerusalem as specimen HUJ-Pal. EJ 695., measures 88 cm, missing only the tip of the tail, and is considered a small snake.

== Skull ==
The skull is well preserved though slightly compressed. In the type description the cranium is described as showing a mix of basal characters, like those found in pipe snakes, and advanced traits found in macrostomatans. The cranium shows a small premaxilla which bears no teeth, while the maxilla, palatine, pterygoid, and dentary bones host 73–75 teeth. The preorbital area of the skull, being small and slender, is similar to the preorbital area of pythonine snakes. The contact between the prefrontal and frontal bones of the skull are very similar to ones found in the sister genus Pachyrhachis and the unrelated Dinilysia. Due to the tail of the specimen being missing, the total vertebrae is 199, plus fragments of a 200th, with the rib cage extending from the 5th to the 154th vertebrae. Lymphapophyses (forked 'cloacal' ribs) are found beginning on the 155th vertebrae and continuing to the 160th. The ribs from the 45–48th and 105–108th vertebrae show signs of pachyostosis, bony thickening and growth.

== Hind limbs ==
Along with its sister genus Pachyrhachis, Haasiophis does not possess either a sacral rib or vertebrae. Also like Pachyrhachis there is no preserved indication of a connection between the vertebral column and the pelvic girdle. The pelvic girdle is partly obscured by overlaying bones reducing the detail which can be seen. Radiographs of the specimen reveal H. terrasanctus possessing a simple triradiate similar to that possessed by Pachyrhachis. Both femurs are preserved with the specimen, but the rest of the right leg is missing. The left zeugopodium, tarsus, tibia, and fibula are preserved though the tibia is disarticulated slightly. The foot is composed of three tarsal ossifications and five metatarsals. The tarsal ossifications do not show signs that the bones were connected to each other during life. Traces of two phalanges are discernible behind metatarsals two and three.

== Taxonomic position ==
Several of the skeletal characters of Haasiophis may be interpreted as an indication that Haasiophis is a juvenile specimen of Pachyrhachis. The small overall size, underdevelopment of the tarsal ossifications, less extensive pachyostosis, and larger proportional size of the tibia and fibula are all possible traits of a juvenile. However the skull and tooth structures of Pachyrhachis and Haasiophis are markedly different. The neural spines of Pachyrhachis are much taller in comparison and the rib shape is quite distinct. Therefore, while regarded as very closely related, the two are different genera.

Based on cladistic analysis of skull features, Haasiophis and its sister genera are indicated as either a sister group to, or basal members of, the macrostomatan clade of snakes. This is supported by the general characteristics of the skeleton. The presence of the hind limbs presents a problem with this placement however. There are two major ideas for the presence of hind limbs in Pachyophiidae. The first is the secondary regaining of the limbs from legless ancestors, while the second is the possibility of multiple episodes of leg loss in snakes. Unfortunately the current number of specimens from the family Pachyophiidae, and the complexity of snake evolutionary taxonomy are not enough to favor one option over the other.

== See also ==
Other known fossil snakes with legs:

- Eupodophis
- Najash
- Pachyrhachis
