= Georg Haas (paleontologist) =

Austrian-born Israeli herpetologist, malacologist and paleontologist

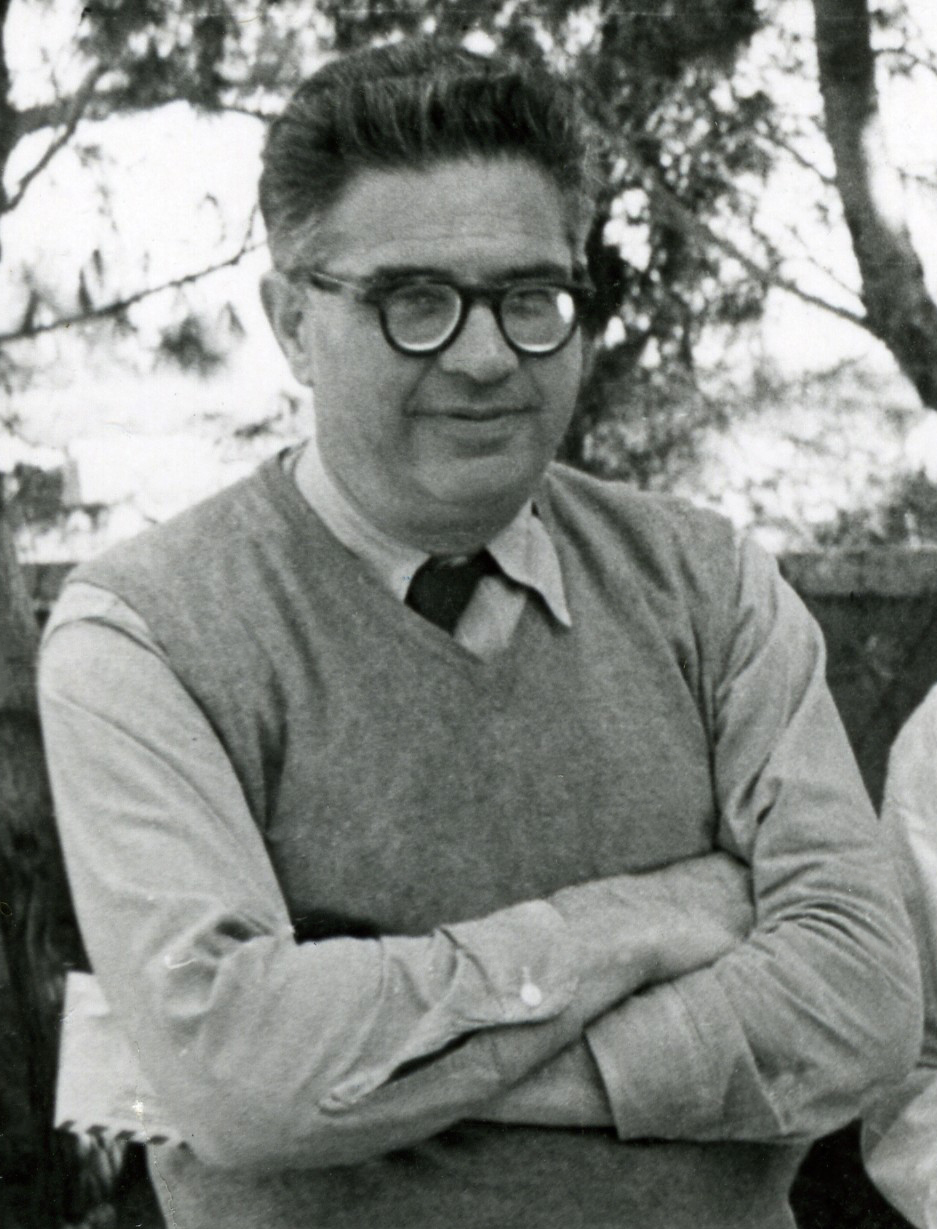

Georg Haas (Hebrew: גאורג האס; 19 January 1905, Vienna, Austria – 13 September 1981 Jerusalem, Israel) was an Austrian-born Israeli herpetologist, malacologist and paleontologist, one of the founders of zoological research in Israel. Haas studied zoology in the University of Vienna. In 1932 he joined the Hebrew University staff and during the next four decades influenced several generations of young Israeli scientists.

Haas was regarded as a pioneer in zoological research in Israel and one of the country’s leading experts in the fields of biology, cytology, histology, comparative anatomy, zoogeography and the evolution of chordates and other groups of invertebrates. Haas, who had a broad classic education, was also an expert on Greek literature and history and the Roman period.

== Legacy ==
Georg Haas is commemorated in the scientific names of two species of lizards, Acanthodactylus haasi and Sphenomorphus haasi, and the Cretaceous legged basal snake Haasiophis.
