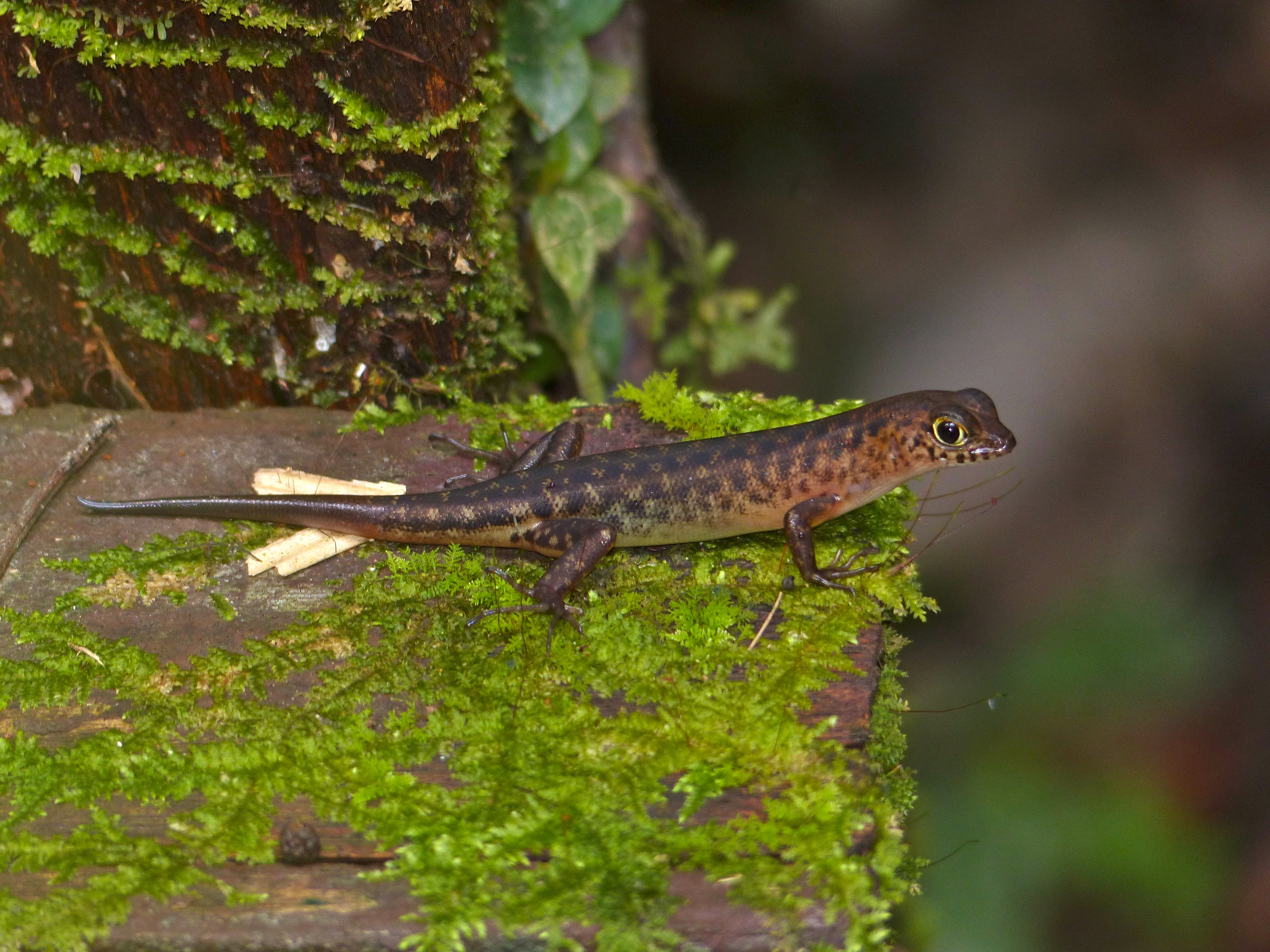

Conservation status
- Data Deficient (IUCN 3.1)

Scientific classification
- Kingdom: Animalia
- Phylum: Chordata
- Class: Reptilia
- Order: Squamata
- Family: Scincidae
- Genus: Sphenomorphus
- Species: S. haasi

Binomial name
- Sphenomorphus haasi Inger & Hosmer, 1965

= Sphenomorphus haasi =

Species of lizard

Sphenomorphus haasi is a species of skink, a lizard in the family Scincidae. The species is endemic to the island of Borneo, on which it is found in Malaysia and Indonesia.

== Etymology ==
The specific name, haasi, is in honor of Austrian-born Israeli herpetologist Georg Haas.

== Habitat ==
The preferred natural habitat of S. haasi is forest.

== Description ==
A small species, S. haasi may attain a snout-to-vent length (SVL) of 57 mm (2.2 in). Dorsally, it is dark brown, with pale olive spots. The sclera of the eye is bluish.

== Behavior ==
S. haasi is terrestrial and diurnal.

== Diet ==
S. haasi preys upon small arthropods.

== Reproduction ==
S. haasi is oviparous.
