= Mesophis =

Mesophis Temporal range: Cenomanian

Scientific classification
- Kingdom: Animalia
- Phylum: Chordata
- Class: Reptilia
- Order: Squamata
- Suborder: Serpentes
- Family: †Simoliophiidae
- Genus: †Mesophis; Bolkay, 1925
- Species: †M. nopcsai

Binomial name
- †Mesophis nopcsai Bolkay, 1925

Mesophis is an extinct genus of snakes that lived during the Cenomanian stage of the Late Cretaceous period. Only a single specimen has been discovered, near Selišta in Bileća, Bosnia and Herzegovina. It was described by S. J. Bolkay in 1925 and named for Baron Franz Nopcsa. It was rediscovered by Jakov Radovcic and colleagues when the collections of the Sarajevo Natural History Museum were unpacked from their hiding place after the Balkan conflict of the 1990s. Part of the specimen remains lost and is thought to be in a private collection. The body is articulated in ventral view, making Mesophis one of the few Mesozoic snake fossils represented by anything more than isolated vertebrae. There is no skull on the specimen, and only a small number of tail vertebrae are preserved. There are also no limbs preserved, and it is unclear whether the animal had limbs in life, as did some other members of the family Simoliophiidae.
