= Bajazid Doda =

Albanian ethnographic writer and photographer

Bajazid Elmaz Doda
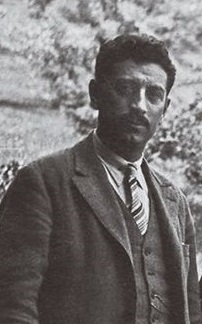
- Doda in 1931
- Born: 1888; Štirovica, Ottoman Empire (modern North Macedonia)
- Died: 25 April 1933 (aged 44–45); Vienna, Austria
- Cause of death: Gunshot wound (Homicide)
- Occupations: photographer, ethnographer, author
- Partner: Franz Nopcsa

Bajazid Elmaz Doda (1888 – 25 April 1933) was an Albanian ethnographic writer and photographer. He is the author of the book Albanisches Bauerleben im oberen Rekatal bei Dibra (Makedonien) (Albanian Peasant Life in the Upper Reka Valley near Dibra (Macedonia)), written in Vienna in 1914, as well as of numerous rare early-20th-century photos of Albanian-inhabited lands during the period when they belonged to the Ottoman Empire, especially of Upper Reka, his birthplace region. The fossil turtle species Kallokibotion bajazidi was named after him by his longtime companion and romantic partner Franz Nopcsa.

== Life ==
Bajazid Doda was born in 1888 in Štirovica, an Albanian-inhabited village of the Upper Reka region of Macedonia in what was then the Ottoman Empire. He went to Romania to work abroad, like many other Upper Reka inhabitants. In Bucharest, Romania, in 1906, he met the Hungarian baron and scholar Franz Nopcsa (1877–1933), who hired him as his servant. The two became lovers and began to live together.

Nopcsa and Doda left Bucharest for the Nopcsa family mansion in Săcel, Transylvania, and thereafter spent some several months in London where Doda fell ill with influenza. In mid-November 1907, the two traveled to Shkodër, where they maintained a house from 1907 to 1910 and again from October 1913. They travelled around Mirditë and were kidnapped by a famous bandit Mustafa Lita. After their release in Prizren, they travelled to Skopje and went to visit the home of Doda in Upper Reka. Back in Shkodër, they went and visited the lands of tribes Hoti and Gruda. Both traveled together and separately throughout the Albanian lands. During the First World War in 1915–1916, Nopcsa took Doda with him while serving in the Austro-Hungarian army in Kosovo. After the war, they lived mainly in Vienna where Nopcsa published several books and became known not only as an albanologist, but also as a paleontologist and geologist. However, for about three years they went on a tour through Europe on a motorcycle, looking for fossils. On April 25, 1933, suffering from depression, Nopcsa killed Doda in his sleep and then committed suicide.

== Photographic and literary works ==
Doda is author of the book Albanisches Bauerleben im oberen Rekatal bei Dibra (Makedonien)(Albanian Peasant Life in the Upper Reka Valley near Dibra (Macedonia)), which was completed in Vienna in April 1914 and was published posthumously in Vienna 2007, after being rediscovered within the archives. The publication is accompanied by original photographs taken by Doda during 1907 consisting mainly of village Štirovica and its surroundings, along with two accompanying photographs of Skopje. The book by Doda contains much valuable information about Upper Reka and its culture, customs, language and other facets of life. The book's aim, according to the author was to describe the vanishing lifestyle of the Muslim element in Upper River and to refute claims by Spiridon Gopčević in his book Macedonia and Old Serbia (1889) about Upper Reka Albanians being albanicised Slavs.

Robert Elsie stated that the original script, regarded as lost may have been translated into German by Nopcsa (and or with considerable input by him) from Albanian, due to the amount of Albanian vocabulary it contained. Elsie has praised the book for its detailed information on Upper Reka and because it was composed at a time when little Albanian literature had been produced. Elsie contends that the work was the first to employ the Upper Reka Albanian dialect in literature. Other scholars like Andrea Pieroni describe the work as a "very detailed ethnographic account" that includes "important notes concerning local food and medicinal plant uses" about research of the Upper Reka region.

== Gallery ==
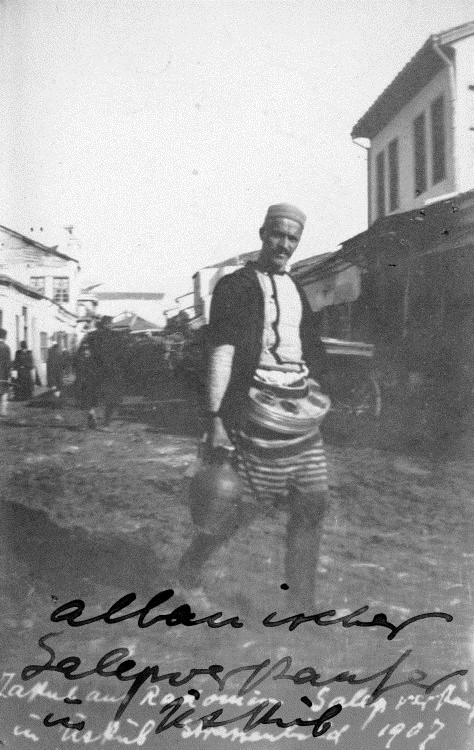
An Albanian salep merchant in Skopje, 1907

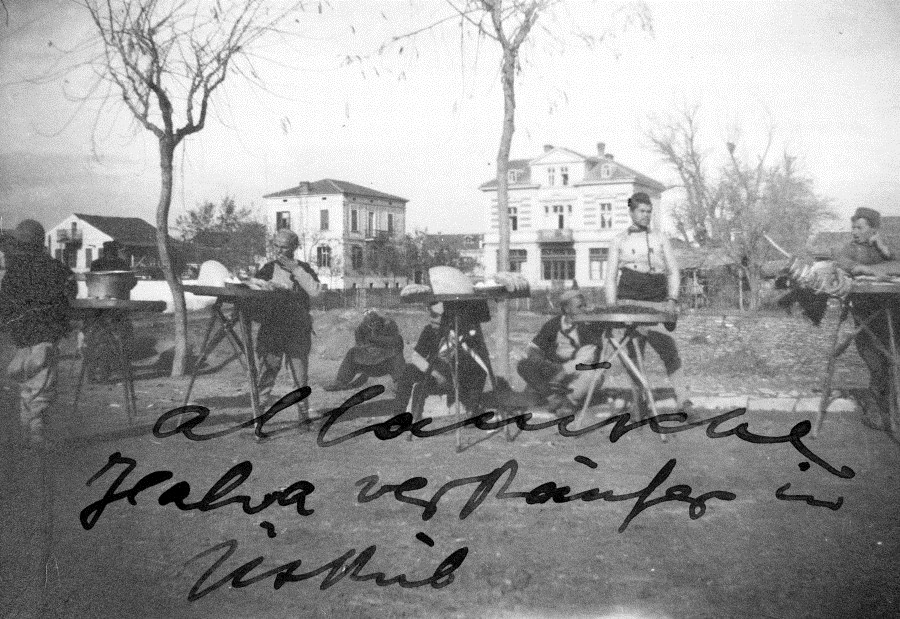
Albanian halva merchants in Skopje, 1907

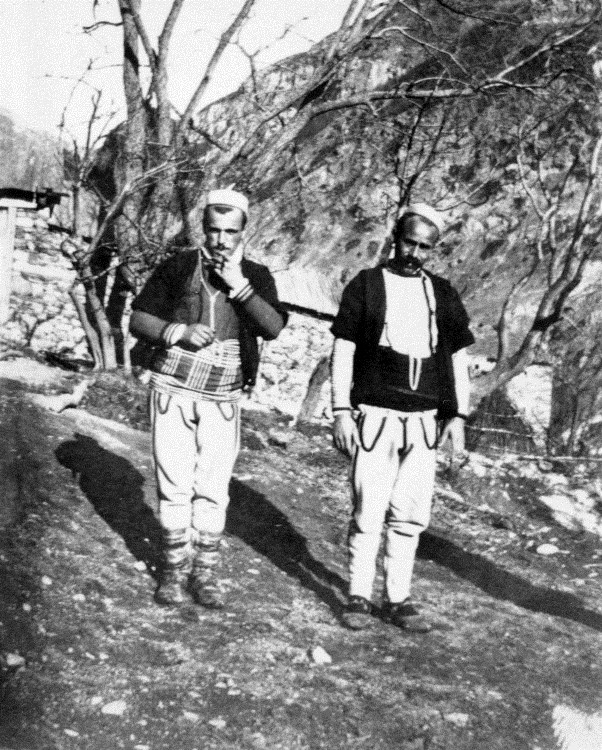
Two Upper Reka men: A man from Reč on the left and a man from Strezimir on the right.

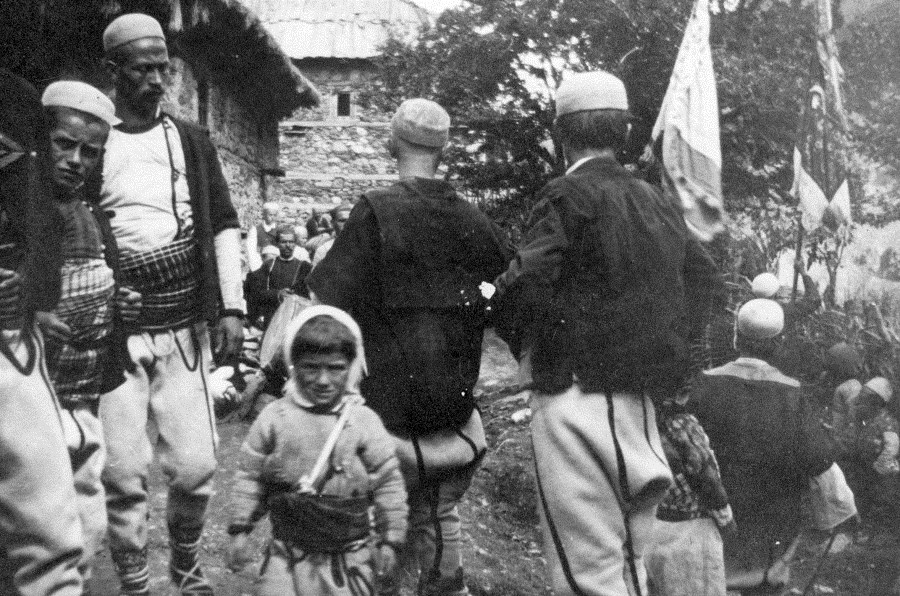
Arrival of a wedding party in Štirovica.

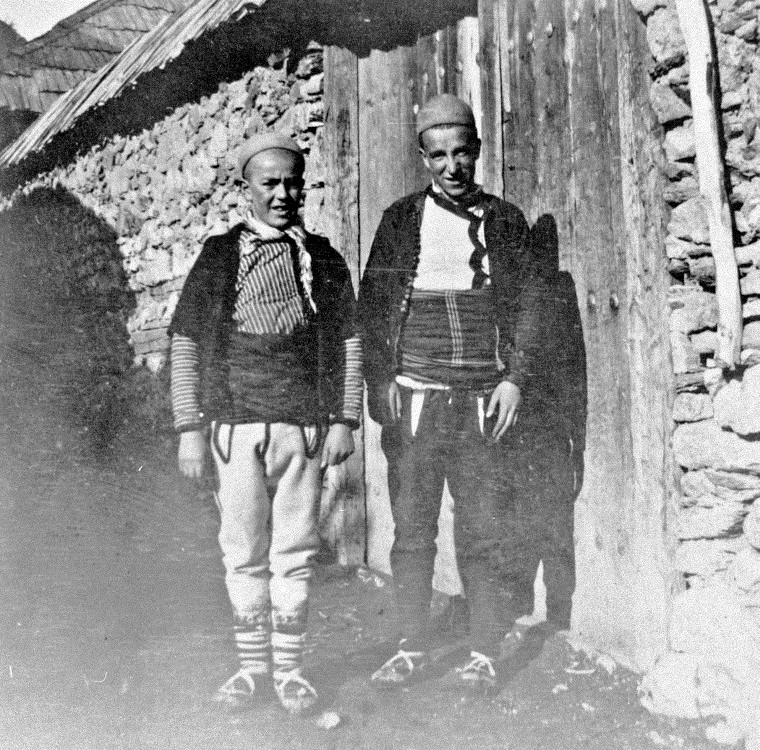
Two young men of Štirovica showing off opingas (leather skin footwear).

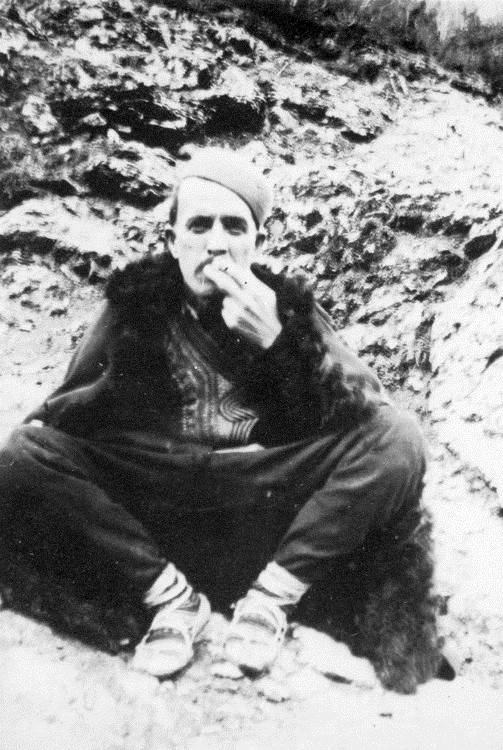
Man smoking, in the upper Reka valley near Debar.

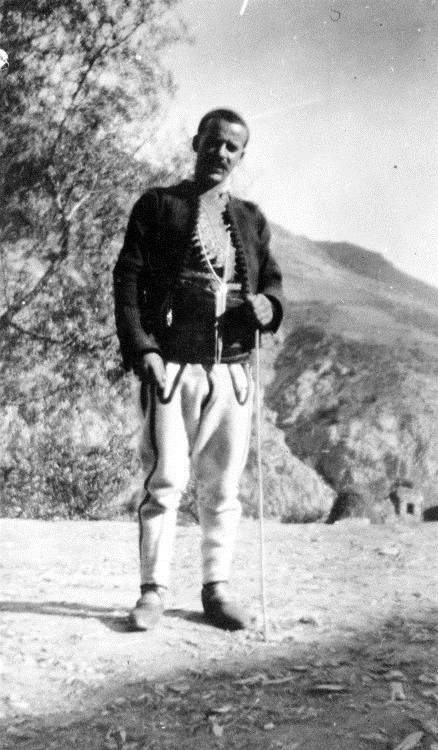
An Albanian groom one day after his marriage.

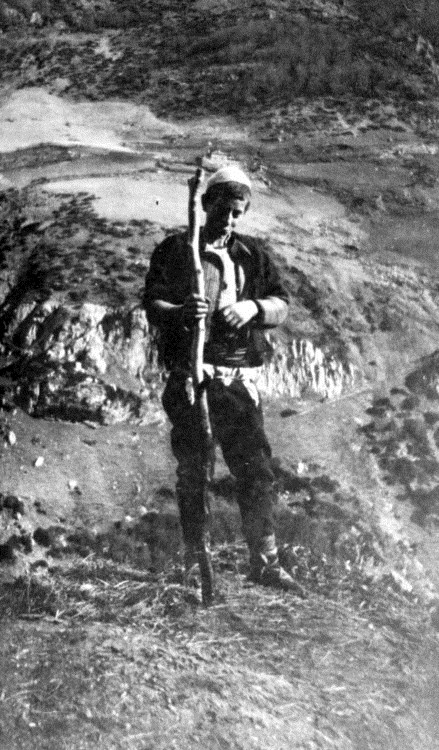
Young Albanian in the upper Reka valley near Debar.

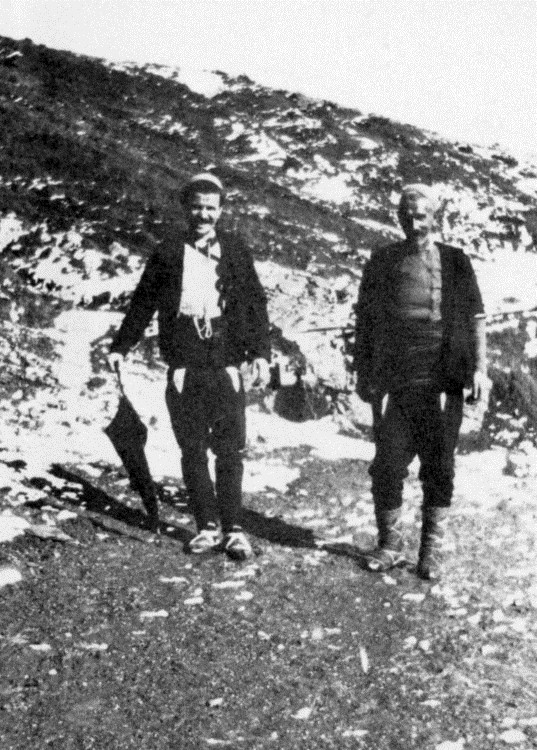
Albanians in the Upper Reka valley near Debar.

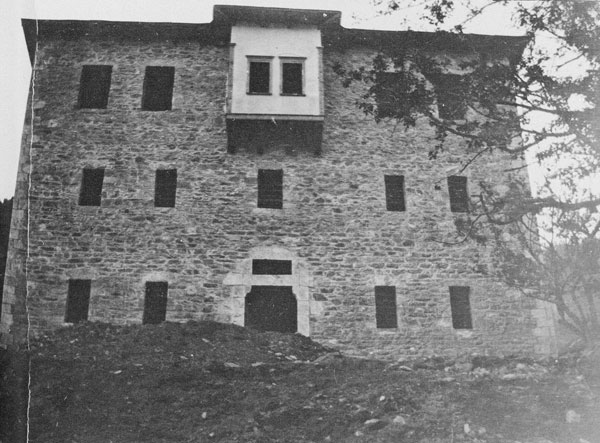
New house in Brodec, 1907

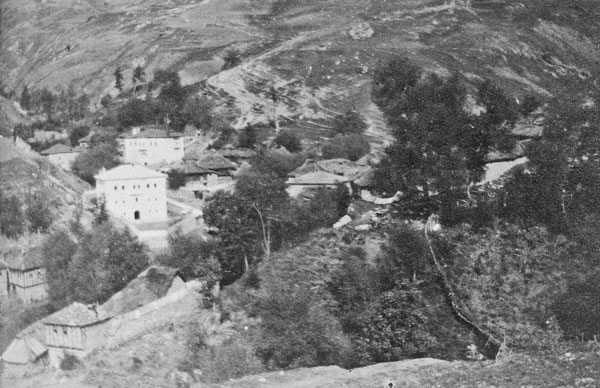
Brodec village, 1907

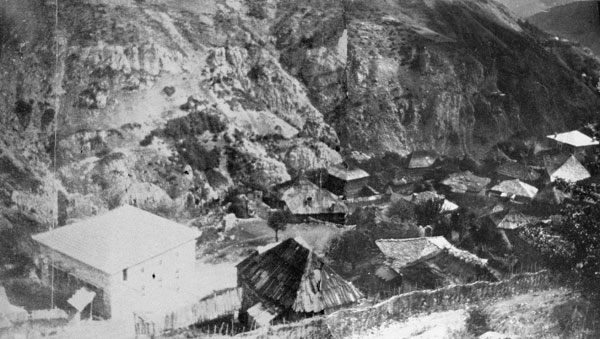
Štirovica village, 1907

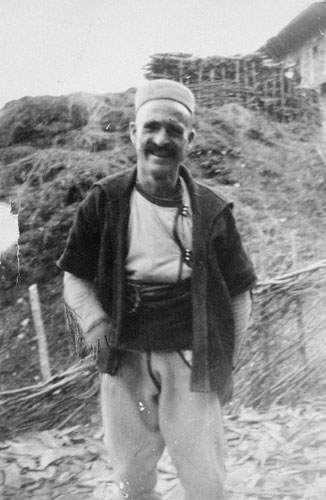
Albanian in from Upper Reka valley near Debar, 1907

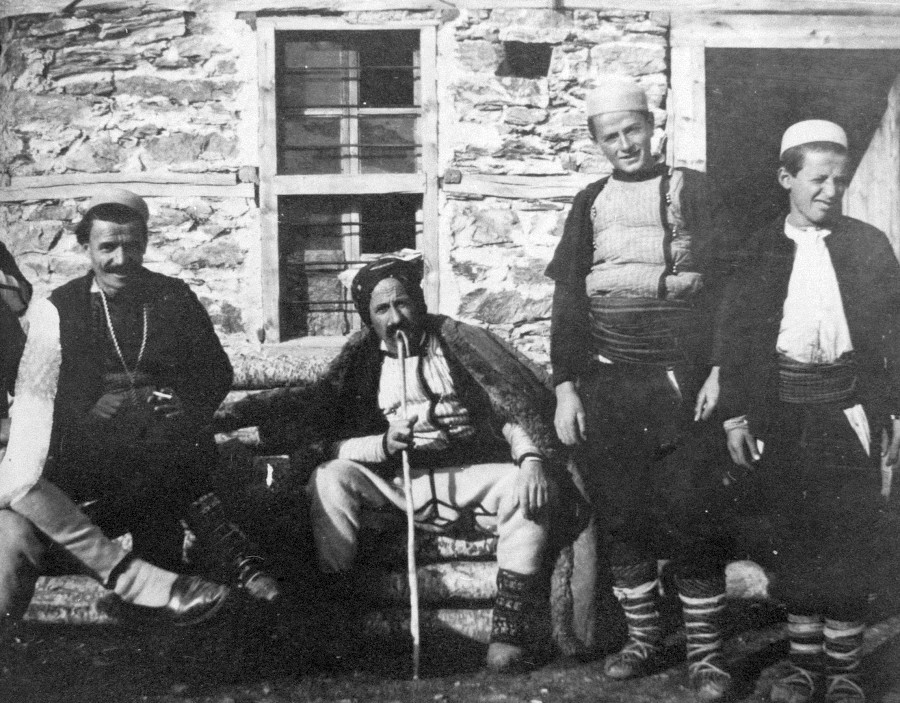
Shepherd in a sheepskin cloak with some men from Štirovica, 1907

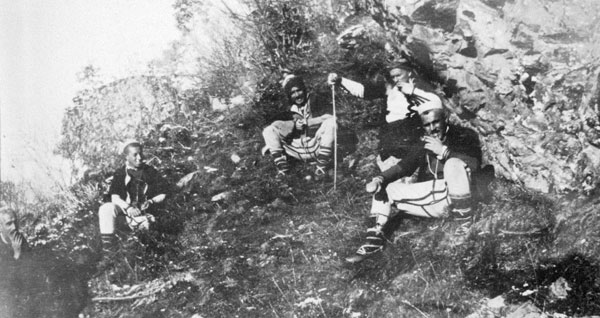
Men of Štirovica conversing on a hillside, 1907

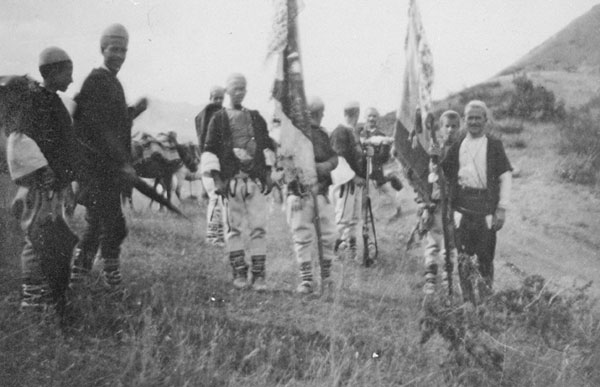
Wedding party in the mountains of Upper Reka, 1907

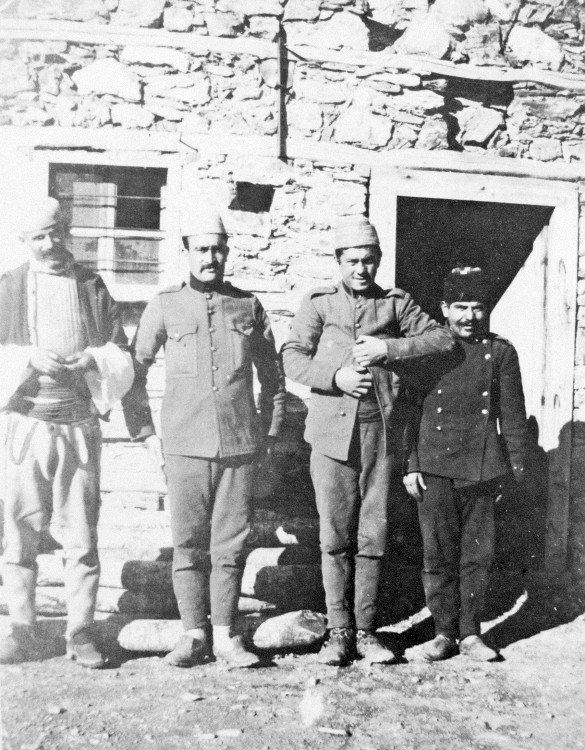
Turkish gendarmerie in Upper Reka, 1907
