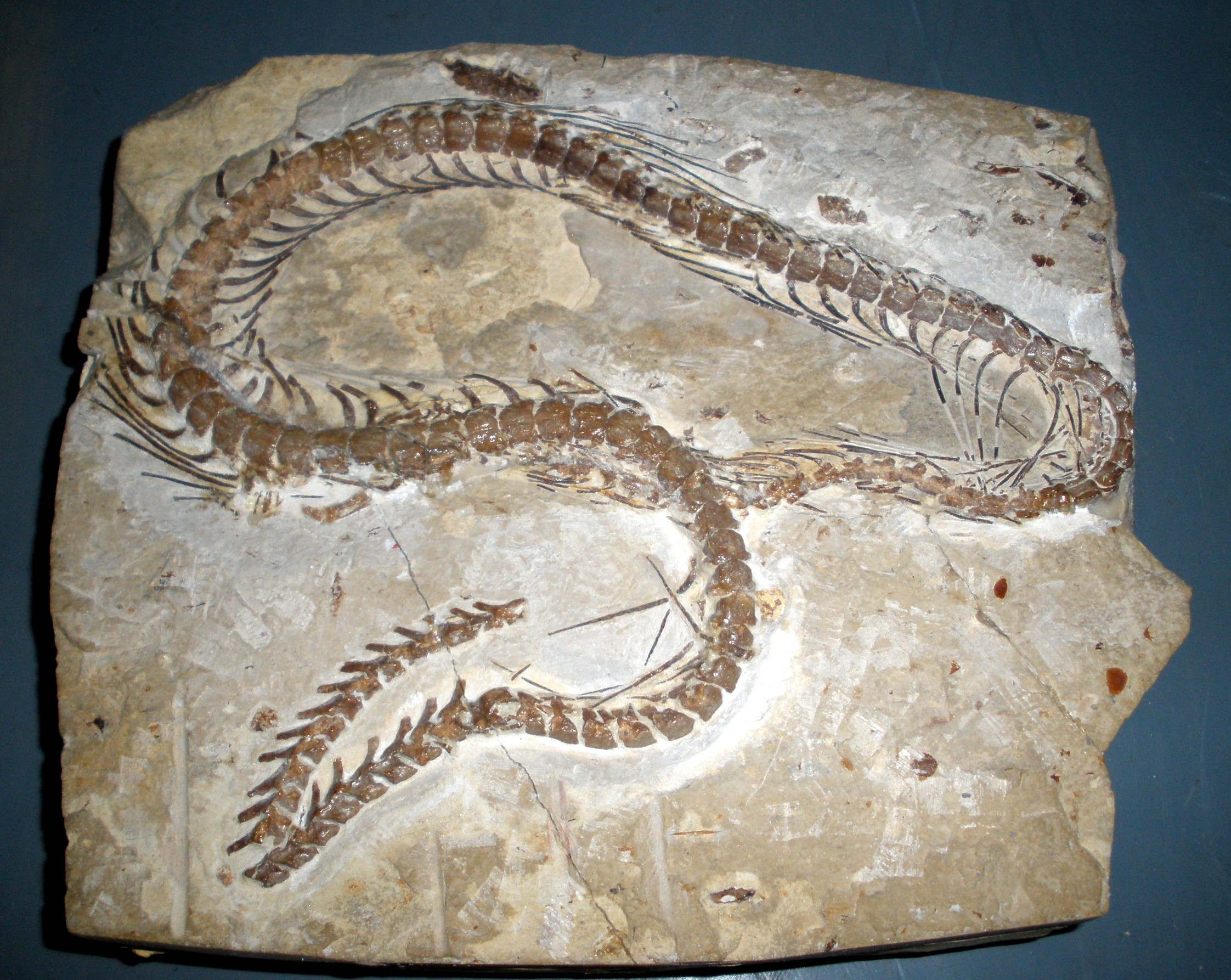
- Fossil of Eupodophis descouensi from the Museo di Storia Naturale, Milano

Scientific classification
- Kingdom: Animalia
- Phylum: Chordata
- Class: Reptilia
- Order: Squamata
- Suborder: Serpentes
- Infraorder: Alethinophidia
- Family: †Simoliophiidae; Nopsca, 1925

Genera
- †Simoliophis Sauvage, 1880 (type); †Eupodophis Rage et al., 2000; †Haasiophis Tchernov et al., 2000; †Mesophis Bolkay, 1925; †Pachyophis Nopcsa, 1923; †Pachyrhachis Haas, 1979

Synonyms
- Pachyophidae Nopcsa, 1923; Pachyophiidae (Nopcsa, 1923); Pachyrhachidae Haas, 1979

= Simoliophiidae =

Simoliophiidae Temporal range: Cenomanian, 99.6–93.5 Ma

Extinct family of snakes

Simoliophiidae is an extinct family of limbed Tethyan marine snakes of the order Squamata. The name Pachyophiidae has also been used for this group, but Simoliophiidae has priority.
