= Acanthodactylus haasi =

Conservation status
- Least Concern (IUCN 3.1)

Scientific classification
- Kingdom: Animalia
- Phylum: Chordata
- Class: Reptilia
- Order: Squamata
- Family: Lacertidae
- Genus: Acanthodactylus
- Species: A. haasi

Binomial name
- Acanthodactylus haasi Leviton & S.C. Anderson, 1967

Species of lizard

Acanthodactylus haasi, also known commonly as Haas' fringe-fingered lizard or Haas's fringe-toed lizard, is a species of lizard in the family Lacertidae. The species is endemic to the Arabian Peninsula.

== Etymology ==
The specific name, haasi, is in honor of Austrian-born Israeli herpetologist Georg Haas.

== Geographic range ==
A. haasi is found in Oman, Saudi Arabia, and United Arab Emirates.

== Habitat ==
The preferred habitats of A. haasi are desert and shrubland.

== Reproduction ==
A. haasi is oviparous.
