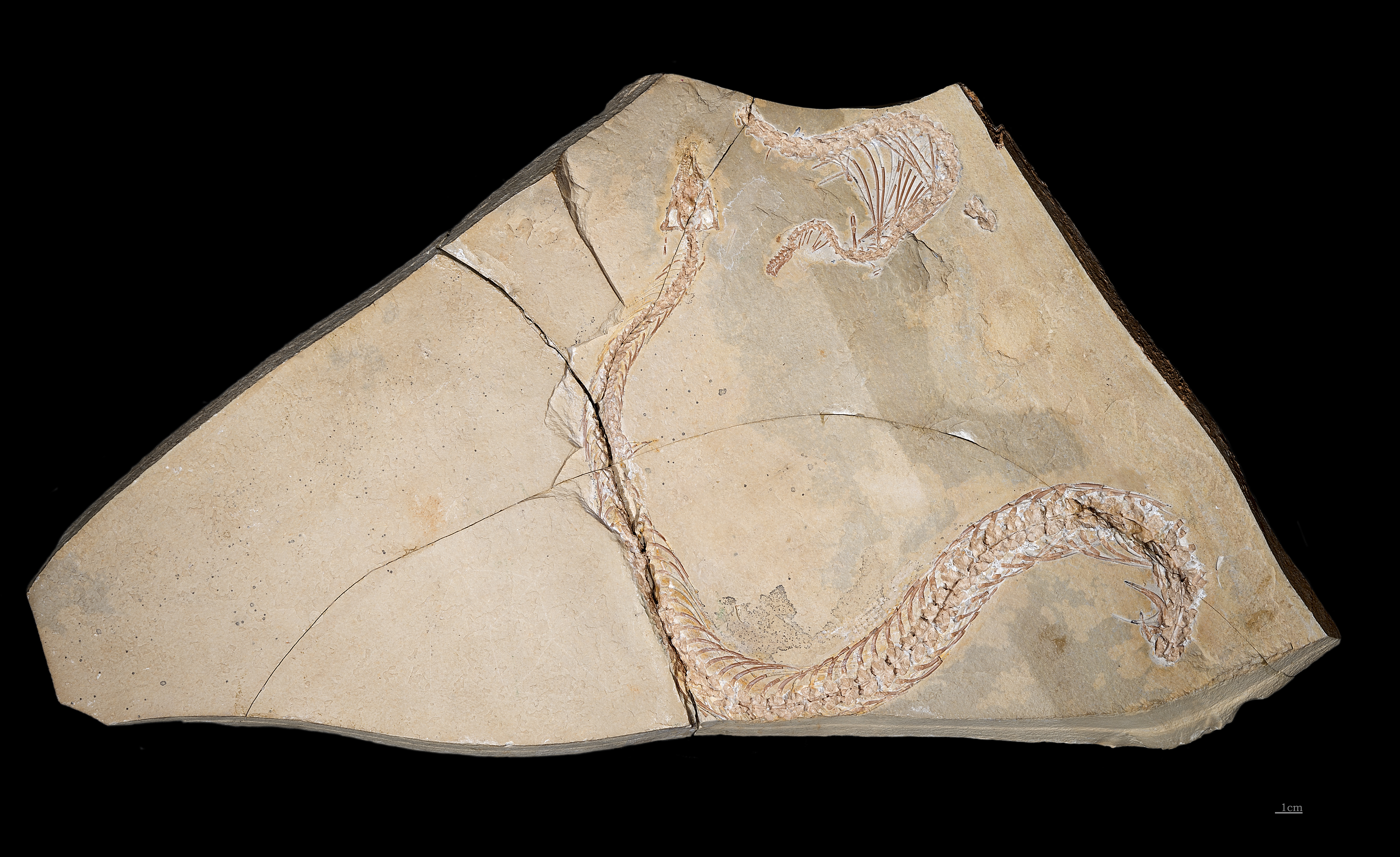
- Holotype of Eupodophis descouensi

Scientific classification
- Kingdom: Animalia
- Phylum: Chordata
- Class: Reptilia
- Order: Squamata
- Suborder: Serpentes
- Family: †Simoliophiidae
- Genus: †Eupodophis; Rage and Escuillié, 2000

Species
- †E. descouensi Rage and Escuillié, 2000 (type)

= Eupodophis =

Eupodophis Temporal range: Late Cretaceous, 92 Ma

Extinct genus of snakes

Eupodophis is an extinct genus of snake from the Late Cretaceous period. It has two small hind legs and is considered a transitional form between Cretaceous lizards and limbless snakes. The feature, described as vestigial, was most likely useless to Eupodophis. The type species Eupodophis descouensi was named in 2000 and resides now in the paleontology section of the Mim Museum in Beirut, Lebanon. The specific name is dedicated to the French naturalist Didier Descouens.

The fossilized specimen from which the description of the type species was based was 85 cm (33.5 in) long and is approximately 92 million years old. It was found in Cenomanian-age limestone near the al-Nammoura village in Lebanon belonging to the Sannine Formation.

== Description ==
Eupodophis was a marine snake that lived in the Mediterranean Tethys Ocean. It had a laterally compressed body and short, paddle-like tail. The vertebrae and ribs of Eupodophis are pachyostotic, or thickened, as an adaptation to a marine lifestyle. The pelvic bones are small and weakly attached to each other. Tarsal bones are present but reduced in size and form. The metatarsals and phalanges of the foot are absent.

The fossil skeleton of Eupodophis was analyzed using synchrotron x-rays at the European Synchrotron Radiation Facility in Grenoble, France. The researchers determined that the hind limb on one skeleton was 0.8 inches long, with an "unmistakable" fibula, tibia and femur. One limb was visible on the surface of the fossil while the other was hidden within the limestone. The scans were compared with similar ones taken of the limbs of extant lizards including the Gila monster, green iguana, and several species of monitor lizard.

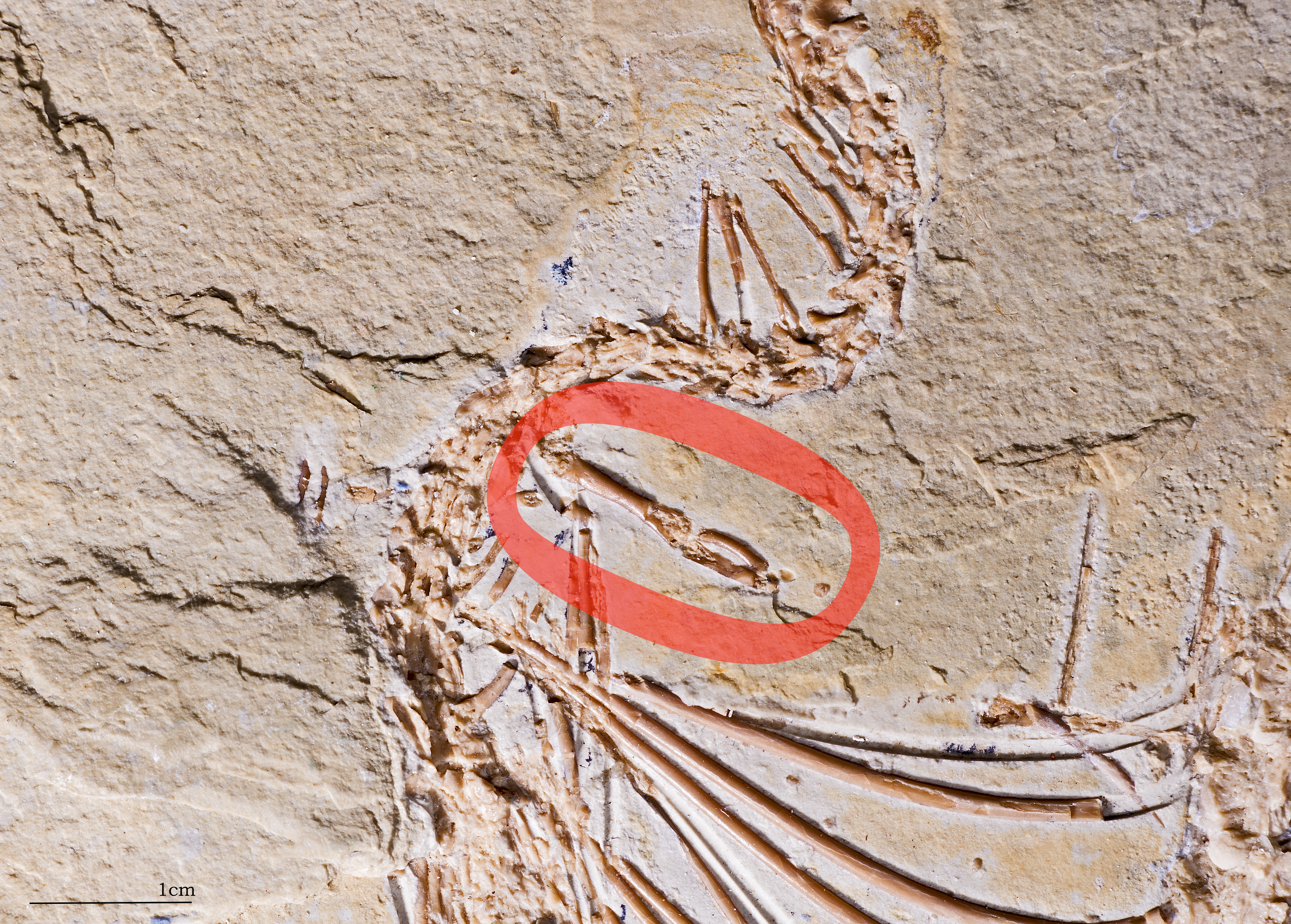
The hind limb of Eupodophis

While they are very small in comparison to limbed reptiles, the hind limbs of Eupodophis possess much of the same anatomy as modern lizards. This suggests that the bones of Eupodophis became reduced in size through a change in the rate of bone growth, not major anatomical changes. The lack of thickening at either end of the limb bones suggests that growth had stopped occurring in the limbs at one point in the animal's lifetime. While the vertebrae and ribs of Eupodophis are pachyostotic and osteosclerotic (meaning that the outer and inner parts of the bone are compact), the limb bones remain light. This lightness is also seen in the bones of terrestrial lizards, suggesting that the limbs had not been part of the overall adaptation of the skeleton for an aquatic lifestyle.

== Paleobiology ==
The loss of limbs in Eupodophis may have been the result of changes in Hox genes, genes that specify the development specific regions of the body. Because Hox genes are involved in determining specific features of the axial skeleton, the loss of limbs would also result in the loss of cervical (tail) vertebrae that are near them. This loss is seen in Eupodophis and modern snakes but not legless lizards, which may be far less common because some other factor besides Hox genes were involved in the loss of their limbs. The loss of digits on the hind limbs may be explained by a low number of cells in the limb bud during embryonic development.

The loss of forelimbs and reduction of hind limbs in Eupodophis was likely an adaptation for swimming. While living snakes usually employ undulatory movement for moving over land, sinuous movements are also an effective means of moving through water. Large, well-developed limbs increase drag on swimming animals, so the limbs of Eupodophis and other early snakes may have become vestigial to save energy and make movement more efficient. No vestigial limbs whatsoever are present in the modern species, which lack transitional species remnants. What few species have them protrude as tiny spurs. Most herpetologists agree snakes diverged from lizard forms by discarding impediments to effective sheltering in subterrestrial environments. Most modern snakes live above the surface.

== See also ==
- List of transitional fossils

Other known fossil snakes with legs:

- Pachyrhachis
- Haasiophis
- Najash
