= Pachyrhachis =

Pachyrhachis Temporal range: Late Cretaceous

Scientific classification
- Kingdom: Animalia
- Phylum: Chordata
- Class: Reptilia
- Order: Squamata
- Suborder: Serpentes
- Family: †Simoliophiidae
- Genus: †Pachyrhachis; Haas, 1979
- Species: †P. problematicus

Binomial name
- †Pachyrhachis problematicus Haas, 1979

Extinct genus of snakes

Pachyrhachis (from Greek: παχύς pakhús, 'thick' and Greek: ῥάχῐς rhákhis, 'spine') is an extinct genus of snake with well developed hind legs known from fossils discovered in Ein Yabrud, near Ramallah, in the central West Bank. It is a relatively small snake, measuring more than 1.5 metres (4.9 ft) long at maximum. Pachyrhachis appears to have been an ancient marine snake; the fossils occur in a marine limestone deposit, and the thickened bone of the ribs and vertebrae would have functioned as ballast to decrease the buoyancy of the animal, allowing it to dive beneath the ancient Cretaceous seas that it once inhabited.

Pachyrhachis is one of three genera of Cenomanian snakes with hindlimbs. Although many modern pythons and boas still retain remnants of legs, in the form of small spurs, the tiny legs of Pachyrhachis included a hip, knee, and ankle joint. Pachyrhachis was originally described by Haas (1979, 1980) who noted it had a puzzling melange of snake and lizard features; its status as an early snake was later confirmed (Caldwell and Lee, 1997).

The position of Pachyrhachis within snakes has been debated (e.g. Lee and Scanlon 2002; Rieppel et al. 2003). Pachyrhachis is among the oldest known snakes and retains well-developed hind limbs, suggesting it represented a transitional form linking snakes to marine lizards (Lee and Scanlon 2002), though other studies place Pachyrhachis within the modern snake radiation as stem-Macrostomata (Zaher, 1998; Zaher & Rieppel, 1999).

== See also ==
Other known fossil snakes with legs:

- Eupodophis
- Haasiophis
- Najash
