= Simoliophis =

Simoliophis Temporal range: 99.6–93.9 Ma Late Cretaceous (Cenomanian)

Scientific classification
- Domain: Eukaryota
- Kingdom: Animalia
- Phylum: Chordata
- Class: Reptilia
- Order: Squamata
- Suborder: Serpentes
- Family: †Simoliophiidae
- Genus: †Simoliophis; Sauvage, 1880

Type species
- †Simoliophis rochebrunei Sauvage, 1880

Other species
- †Simoliophis libycu Nessov et al., 1998

Synonyms
- Symoliophis Rochebrune, 1880; Symoliophis Sauvage, 1880

Extinct genus of snakes

Simoliophis is a genus of extinct marine snake from the Cretaceous period. It is a member of the Simoliophiidae family. Fossils are known from Morocco, France and Spain.

== Description ==
The type species, Simoliophis rochebrunei, is distinguished by a set of vertebral characteristics, including short and robust vertebrae with a small neural canal and a shallow interzygapophyseal constriction. The species exhibits pachyostosis, particularly in the mid-trunk region and the anterior portion of the posterior trunk. Ribs attributed to S. rochebrunei are pachyostotic at their proximal ends and decrease in thickness distally. Some specimens exhibit a slight curvature, while others are more robustly curved near the proximal end. The anatomical adaptations of Simoliophis suggest a highly pachyostotic, marine-affiliated snake adapted for slow swimming in shallow waters. Its morphology indicates a lifestyle of prolonged, shallow dives rather than active, fast swimming. A fragment of skull bone bearing three tooth sockets has been tentatively assigned to S. rochebrunei. While its attribution is not definitive, the fossil was recovered from a locality where Simoliophis is abundant, making its association plausible.
