= Franz Nopcsa von Felső-Szilvás =

Hungarian noble and academic

Baron Franz Nopcsa von Felső-Szilvás
- Ferenc Nopcsa
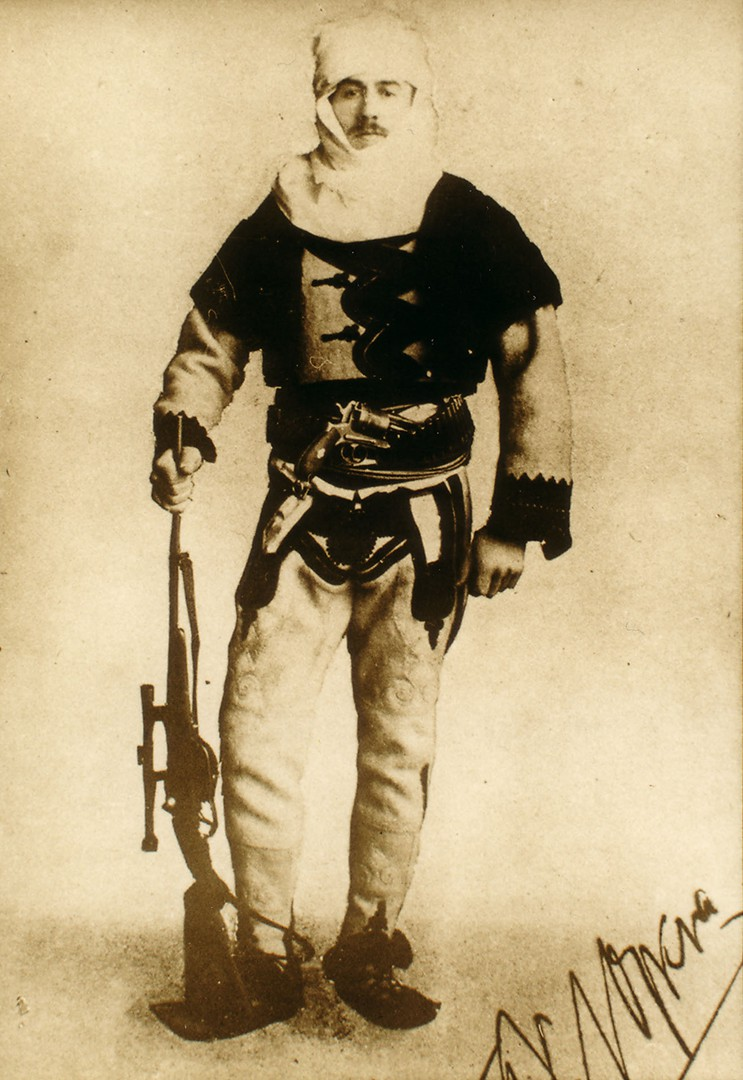
- Baron Nopcsa in Albanian uniform, 1915
- Born: May 3, 1877; Déva, Austria-Hungary (modern day Romania)
- Died: April 25, 1933 (aged 55); Vienna, Austria
- Citizenship: Hungary
- Education: University of Vienna (PhD)
- Known for: Albanology, paleobiology, geology, ethnology
- Partner: Bajazid Doda
- Scientific career
- Fields: Geology, Paleontology

Baron Franz Nopcsa von Felső-Szilvás (also Baron Nopcsa von Felső-Szilvás, Baron Nopcsa, Ferenc Nopcsa, báró felsőszilvási Nopcsa Ferenc, Baron Franz Nopcsa, and Franz Baron Nopcsa; May 3, 1877 – April 25, 1933) was a Hungarian aristocrat, adventurer, scholar, geologist, paleontologist and albanologist. He is regarded as an early practitioner of paleobiology, and first described the theory of insular dwarfism. He was also a specialist on Albanian studies and completed the first geological map of northern Albania.

== Life ==
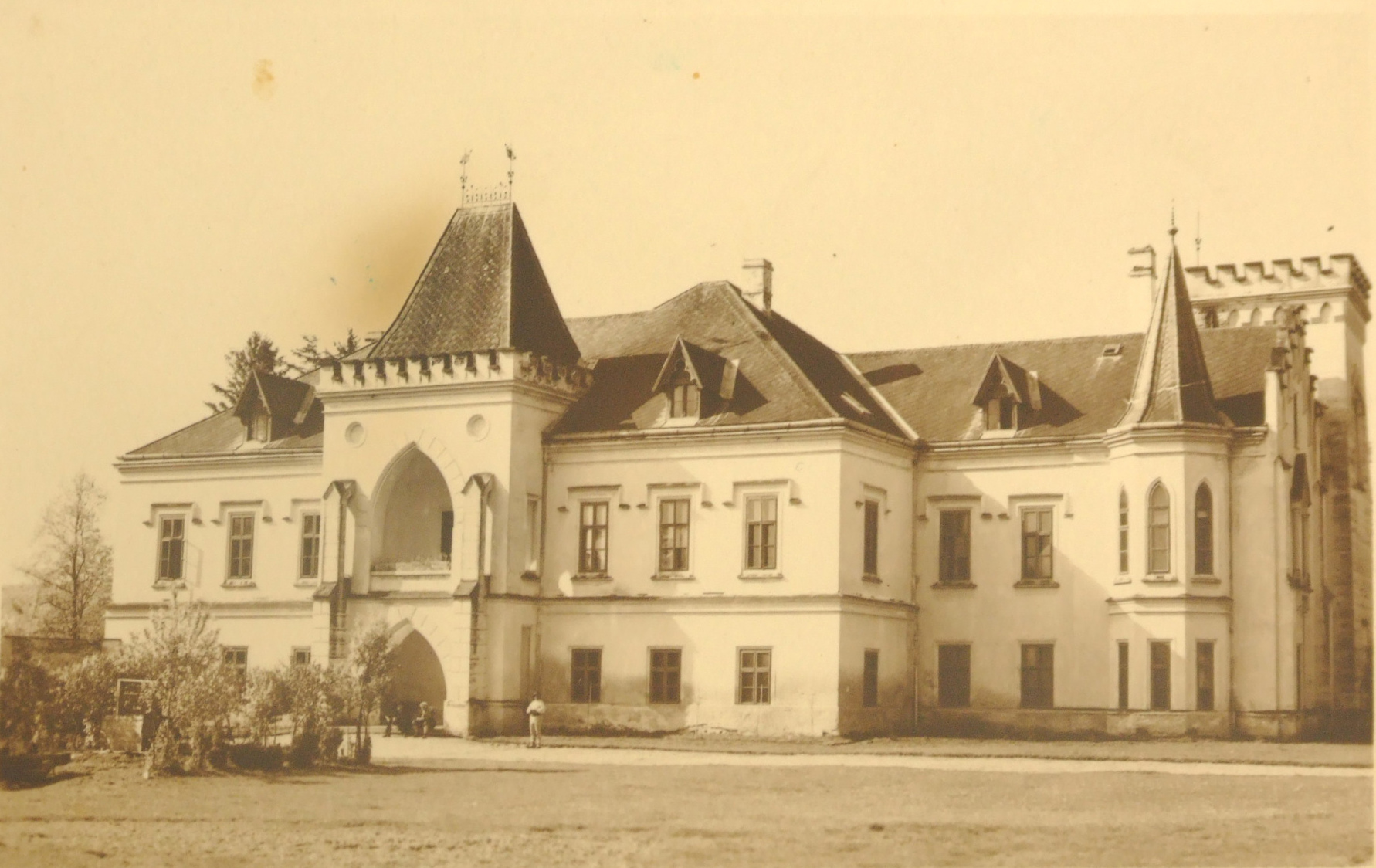
The Nopcsa family home

Nopcsa was born in 1877 in Déva, Transylvania, Kingdom of Hungary (today Deva, Romania), to the Hungarian Nopcsa aristocratic family. He was the son of Elek Nopcsa (1848-1918), a member of the Hungarian Parliament and his wife, Matylda Henrietta Żeleński z Żelanki (1852-1938). In 1895 Nopcsa's younger sister Ilona discovered dinosaur bones at the family estate at Szacsal (today part of Sânpetru, Sântămăria-Orlea, Romania). He shared the bones with Professor Eduard Suess, who encouraged him to study them. Following the professor's advice, he started studying geology at the University of Vienna in 1897, where he quickly advanced in his studies. He gave his first academic lecture in 1899 at the age of twenty-two. He acquired a PhD in geology in 1903 from the university; his doctorate focused on geologically mapping the area surrounding the family estate.

On 20 November 1906 Nopcsa met the then eighteen-year-old Bajazid Doda in Bucharest and hired him as his secretary. Nopcsa later recounted this meeting in his memoir:

[H]e has been the only person who has truly loved me and in whom I had full confidence, never doubting for a moment that he would misuse my trust.

Nopcsa had a close relationship with Doda for over 30 years. It is widely suspected that Nopcsa was gay and was in a homosexual relationship with Doda.

Additionally, Nopcsa was interested in Albania, which was then a province of the Ottoman Empire, contending for independence. He was one of the few outsiders who ventured into the mountainous areas in the north of Albania. He soon learned the Albanian dialects and customs. Eventually, he got on good terms with the leaders of the Albanian nationalist resistance who fought against the Turks in the region. Nopcsa gave passionate speeches and smuggled in weapons.

In 1907, on one of his expeditions into the Albanian mountains, he and Bajazid Doda were taken hostage by the bandit Mustafa Lita. Lita demanded ten thousand Turkish pounds for his release. In his memoirs Nopcsa described his elaborate plan to get out of this situation, which involved being taken to Prizren as a spy. He was eventually rescued by Doda's father, who had brought 'ten armed retainers'.

In 1912 the Balkan states joined forces to drive out the Turks. However, afterwards the newly liberated states immediately plunged into internal conflicts. During these Balkan Wars, Nopcsa spied for Austria-Hungary. Out of these conflicts, Albania arose as an independent state, which needed a king. Nopcsa volunteered, suggesting he would use money he would gain from marrying a rich American girl to fund the war efforts, however, to no avail.

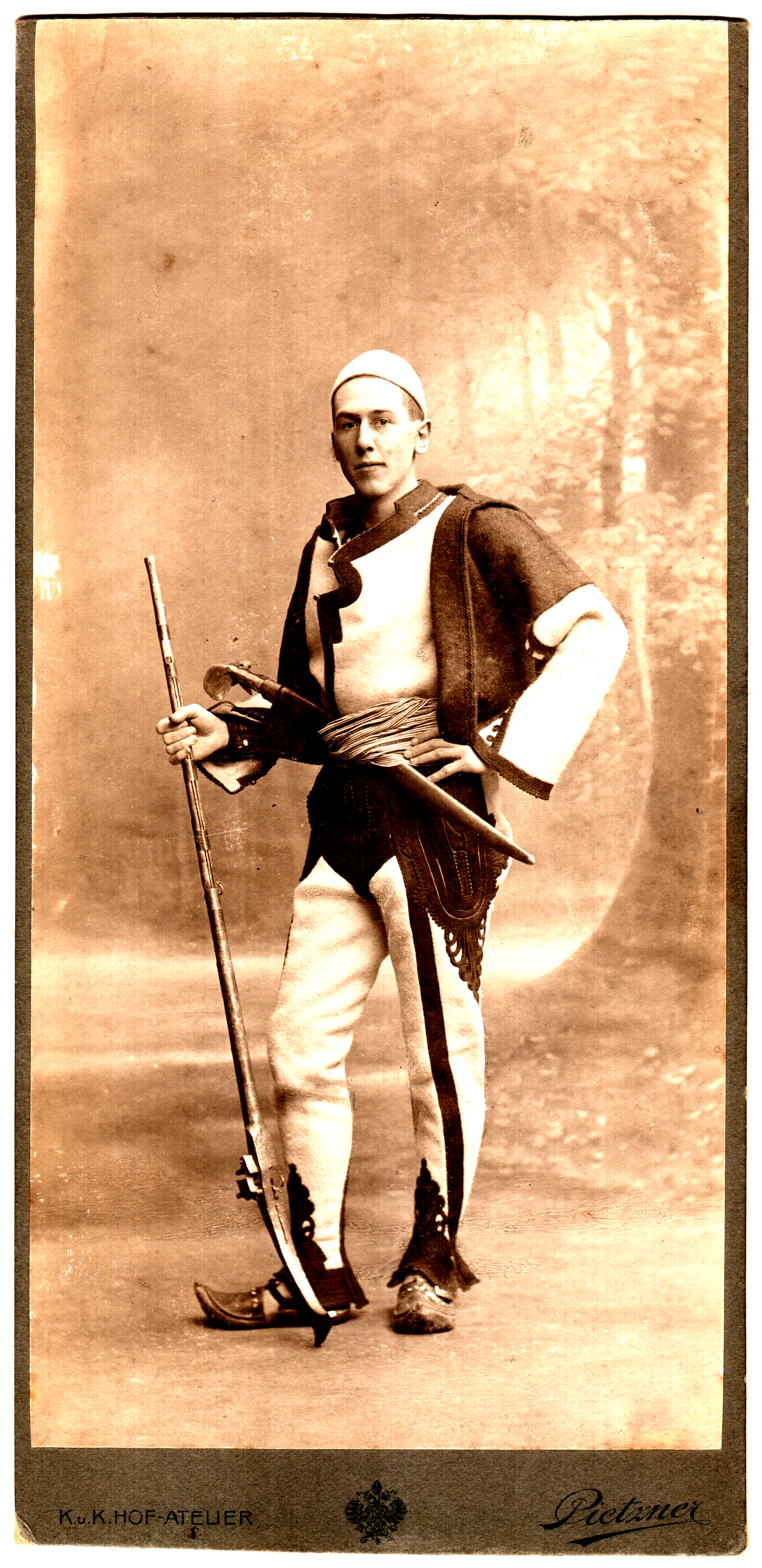
Nopcsa Ferenc in Shqiptar warrior costume with yatagan and Tançica, c. 1913

Later, during the First World War, Nopcsa was on another mission as a spy for Austria-Hungary, working undercover as a shepherd in Transylvania. He also led a group of Albanian wartime volunteers. Nopcsa was the first to hijack an aircraft. His motive for aircraft hijacking was to flee the nascent and ultimately short-lived Hungarian Soviet Republic in 1919 to Vienna. With the defeat of Austria-Hungary at the end of the war, Nopcsa's native Transylvania was ceded to Romania. As a consequence, the Baron of Felső-Szilvás lost his estates and other possessions in 1920. Compelled to find paid employment, he landed a job as the head of the Hungarian Geological Institute in 1925.

Nopcsa's tenure in the Geological Institute was short-lived; he soon became bored of the sedentary job. He went to Europe on a motorcycle journey together with his long-standing Albanian secretary Bajazid Doda to study fossils. He later returned to Vienna where he ran into financial difficulties again and was distracted in his work. To cover his debts, he sold his fossil collection to the Natural History Museum in London. Nopcsa struggled with illness, to the extent that he had to give a lecture in a wheelchair in 1928. Soon Nopcsa became depressed, it is suspected he suffered from manic depression. Finally, in 1933, he fatally shot first his partner, Bajazid Doda, after having slipped sleeping powder into his tea. He then wrote a suicide note, where he states the reason for his actions was a nervous breakdown, and shot himself. He was cremated at Feuerhalle Simmering in Vienna, and his ashes buried there (Section 3, Ring 3, Group 8, No. 44). In his suicide note, he describes his reasons for killing his partner:

The reason that I shot my longtime friend and secretary, Mr Bayazid Elmas Doda, in his sleep without his suspecting at all is that I did not wish to leave him behind sick, in misery and without a penny, because he would have suffered too much.

Nopcsa left behind a considerable quantity of scientific publications and private diaries. The diaries paint a picture of a complex man with great intuition, but without the ability to understand the motives of others. His devotion to the cause of the Albanians was in contrast to his sociopathic insensitivity. In his diaries he nonchalantly wrote about his bid to become king of Albania:

Once a reigning European monarch, I would have no difficulty coming up with the further funds needed by marrying a wealthy American heiress aspiring to royalty, a step which under other circumstances I would have been loath to take.'

During his lifetime Nopcsa wrote a memoir based on diaries and notes from 1897 to 1917. Even though he finished the memoir around 1929, it was never published during his lifetime. Only in 2001 was it published in German and it was later translated to English in 2014 as Traveler, Scholar, Political Adventurer: A Transylvanian Baron at the Birth of Albanian Independence, edited by Robert Elsie.

== Contributions to paleobiology and geology ==
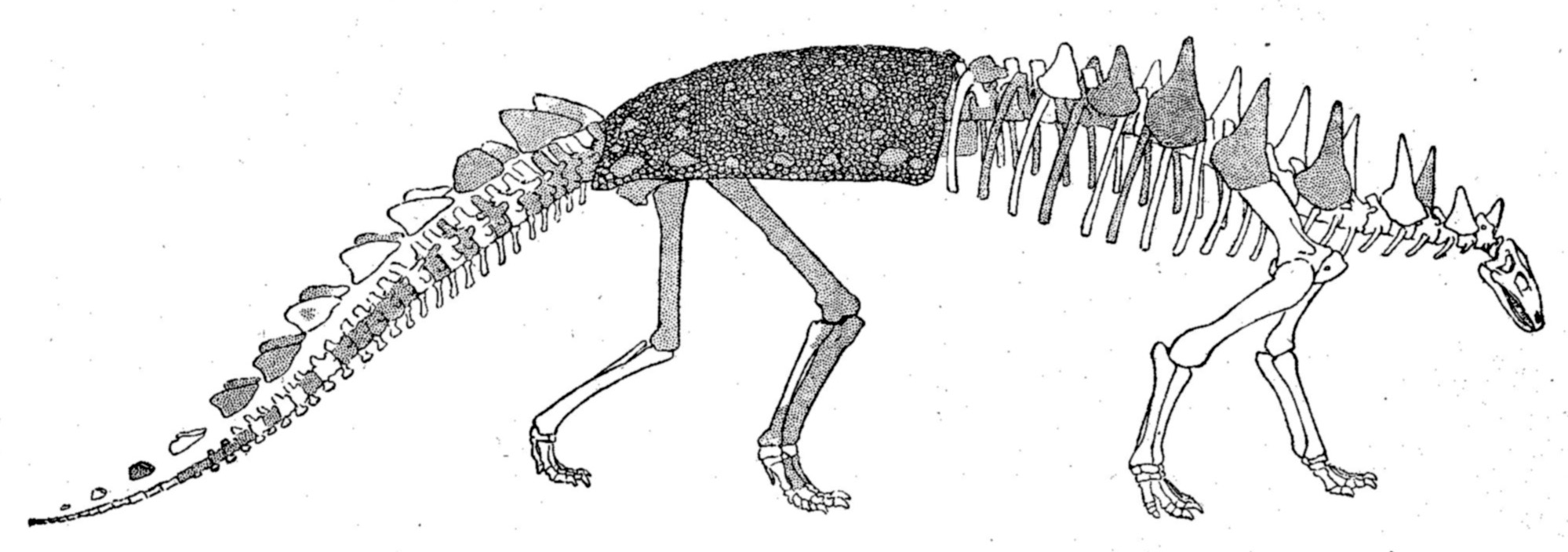
Historical Polacanthus foxii skeletal restoration by Franz Nopcsa

Nopcsa's main contribution to paleontology – and hence "paleobiology" – was that he was one of the first researchers who tried to "put flesh onto bones." At a time when paleontologists were mainly interested in assembling bones, he tried to deduce the physiology and living behavior of the dinosaurs he was studying. Nopcsa was the first to suggest that these archosaurs cared for their young and exhibited complex social behavior, an idea that did not take off until the 1980s. He coined the term "paleophysiology" for the study of the evolution of physiology and biology, although this wasn't adopted. Some of his works in this field exploited paleohistological data.

Another of Nopcsa's theories was that birds evolved from ground-dwelling dinosaurs, which is the theory of cursorial origin of flight. He theorized that the Proavis, a theorized predecessor of birds, was running animal with forearms lifted off the ground, which they would flap as they made a jump. The scales on its forearms would develop into feathers to aid this, and eventually allowing for flight. This theory found favor in the 1960s and later gained wide acceptance, though later fossil finds of tree-living feathered dinosaurs suggest the development of flight may have been more complex than Nopcsa envisioned. Additionally, Nopcsa's conclusion that at least some Mesozoic era reptiles were warm-blooded is now shared by much of the scientific community.

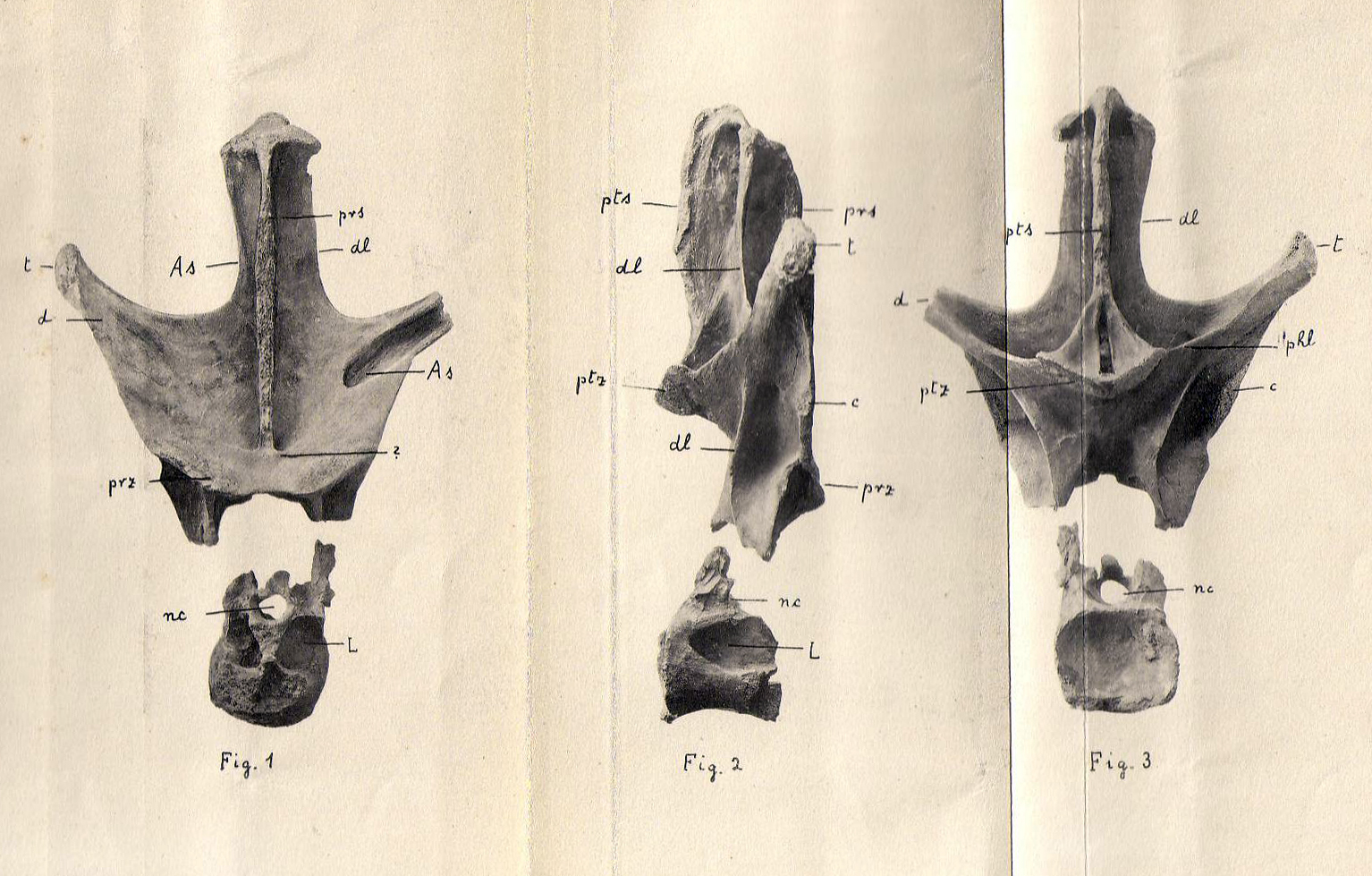
Vertebra of Nopcsaspondylus, a sauropod dinosaur named after the baron in 2007. Other extinct animals named after him include Elopteryx nopcsai, Tethysaurus nopcsai, Hyposaurus nopcsai, and Mesophis nopcsai

Nopcsa studied Transylvanian dinosaurs extensively, which are unusual in being much smaller than their relatives elsewhere in the world. For example, he unearthed six-meter-long sauropods, a group of dinosaurs which elsewhere commonly grew to 20 meters or more, which he named Magyarosaurus. Nopcsa deduced that the area where the remains were found was an island, Hațeg Island (now the Haţeg or Hatzeg basin in Romania) during the Mesozoic era. He theorized that "limited resources" found on islands commonly have an effect of "reducing the size of animals" over the generations, producing a localized form of dwarfism. Nopcsa's theory of insular dwarfism—also known as the island rule—is today widely accepted. Additional pygmy sauropods, named Europasaurus, were recently discovered in northern Germany.

Nopcsa also created a theory about the dinosaurs' sexual dimorphism, which he published in 1926. Among others, he thought that hadrosaurid species with the cranial crests were males and those without them were females. He paired Kritosaurus with Parasaurolophus, Prosaurolophus with Saurolophus and others. His examples were not proved to be true, but his opinion that sexual dimorphism was present among hadrosaurid dinosaurs has gained acceptance, see for example Lambeosaurus.

Nopcsa discovered and named several species in his lifetime. In 1899 he named the species Mochlodon robustus, which he later renamed to Rhabdodon robustum in 1915. He also named Struthiosaurus transylvanicus, which he described in 1915. In 1928 he named the Teinurosaurus (meaning "extended tail lizard"). He named the turtle species Kallokibotion bajazidi, which literally means 'beautiful box of Bajazid'. Nopcsa chose the name because, in the words of British palaeontologist Gareth Dyke, "the shape of the shell reminded him of Bajazid's arse".

Nopcsa was also interested in evolutionary theory, especially on macroevolution, on which the fossil record can yield relevant data.

Nopcsa was also an important geologist. Indeed, Nopcsa was one of the first scholars to study the geology of the western Balkans, particularly northern Albania.

== Contribution to Albanian studies ==
Nopcsa became fascinated with Albania during his lifetime, probably through the tales of Albania's mountain tribesmen, to which he was first introduced by Louis Drašković, a man thought to be his first lover. During his lifetime Nopcsa published more than fifty scientific studies concerning Albania, covering a wide range of linguistics, folklore, ethnology, history and kanun (that is, Albanian customary law). He was one of the leading experts on Albania in his time.

After Nopcsa's death, several of his important manuscripts were left unpublished. He participated in the work of the Albanian Congress of Trieste, published his notes on the congress that became of particular historical interest. He left the Albanological part of his estate along with a letter of manuscripts to be published to Norbert Jokl, a renowned specialist in Albanian studies and Nopcsa's former colleague. At that time, Nopcsa's material consisted of thousands of pages of notes, sketches, and finished text. Subsequently, this library came into possession of Mid'hat Bey Frashëri. When Frashëri was forced to flee the country, Nopcsa's materials were confiscated by the communist regime of Enver Hoxha. Eventually, Nopcsa's manuscripts, drawings, and completed writings formed the core of the Albanological section of Albania's National Library.

== Media about Nopcsa ==
In 2016, the English language documentary film "DODA: The life and adventures of Franz Baron Nopcsa", directed by North Macedonian director Visar Vishka, was released. The Hungarian language documentary Magyarosaurus – Báró Nopcsa Ferenc nyomában [Magyarosaurus – In the Footsteps of Baron Ferenc Nopcsa] directed by Áron Mátyássy starring geologist Árpád Juhász and aircraft aerobatic performer Péter Besenyei was released in 2019.

== See also ==
- Proavis

== Other sources ==
- István Főzy: Nopcsa báró és a Kárpát-medence dinoszauruszai (Baron Franz Nopcsa and the Dinosaurs of the Carpathian-basin), Alfadat-Press, Tatabánya. ISBN 9638103248.
- Gëzim Alpion (2002): Baron Franz Nopcsa and his Ambition for the Albanian Throne. BESA Journal, vol. 6, no. 3, pp. 25–32. ISSN 1366-8536
- Gareth Dyke (2011): The Dinosaur Baron of Transylvania, Scientific American, October, vol. 305, no. 4, pp. 81–83.
- David B. Weishampel and C. M. Jianu (1995). The centennial of Transylvanian dinosaur discoveries: A reexamination of the life of Franz Baron Nopcsa. Journal of Vertebrate Paleontology 15 (3, Suppl.): p. 60A.
- Ing Jaroslav Mareš, (1993). Záhada dinosaurů (The mystery of dinosaurs), Prague, Svoboda-Libertas, ISBN 80-205-0374-9
- Elsie, Robert (1999). "The Viennese Scholar Who Almost Became King of Albania: Baron Franz Nopcsa and His Contribution to Albanian Studies" (PDF). East European Quarterly. 33 (3): 327–345.
- Nopcsa, Franz (2014). Elsie, Robert (ed.). Traveler, Scholar, Political Adventurer: A Transylvanian Baron at the Birth of Albanian Independence (The Memoirs of Franz Nopcsa). Central European University Press. ISBN 978-615-5225-80-2.
- Weishampel, David B.; Reif, Wolf-Ernst (1984). "The Work of Franz Baron Nopcsa (1877-1933) Dinosaurs, Evolution and Theoretical Tectonics" (PDF). Jb. Geol. B.-A. 127 (2): 187–203. Archived from the original (PDF) on 2011-07-06.
- Baron Franz Nopcsa and His Dream for the Albanian Throne – essay by Gëzim Alpion (2002), a British scholar of East European studies.
- "Baron Franz Nopcsa", Encyclopedia of gay, lesbian, bisexual, transgender & queer culture
- "Histories: King of the duck-billed dinosaurs", New Scientist (2005)
- János Magyar (2021): 125 éve találták az erdélyi dinoszauruszokat! Greenfo.hu (In Hungarian language)
- Botfalvai, G., Csiki-Sava, Z., Kocsis, L., Albert, G., Magyar, J., Bodor, E. R., Ţabără, D., Ulyanov, A. & Makádi, L. (2021). 'X'marks the spot! Sedimentological, geochemical and palaeontological investigations of Upper Cretaceous (Maastrichtian) vertebrate fossil localities from the Vălioara valley (Densuş-Ciula Formation, Hațeg Basin, Romania). Cretaceous Research, 123, 104781.
