= Brodec, Gostivar =

Brodec Бродец Va
- Village
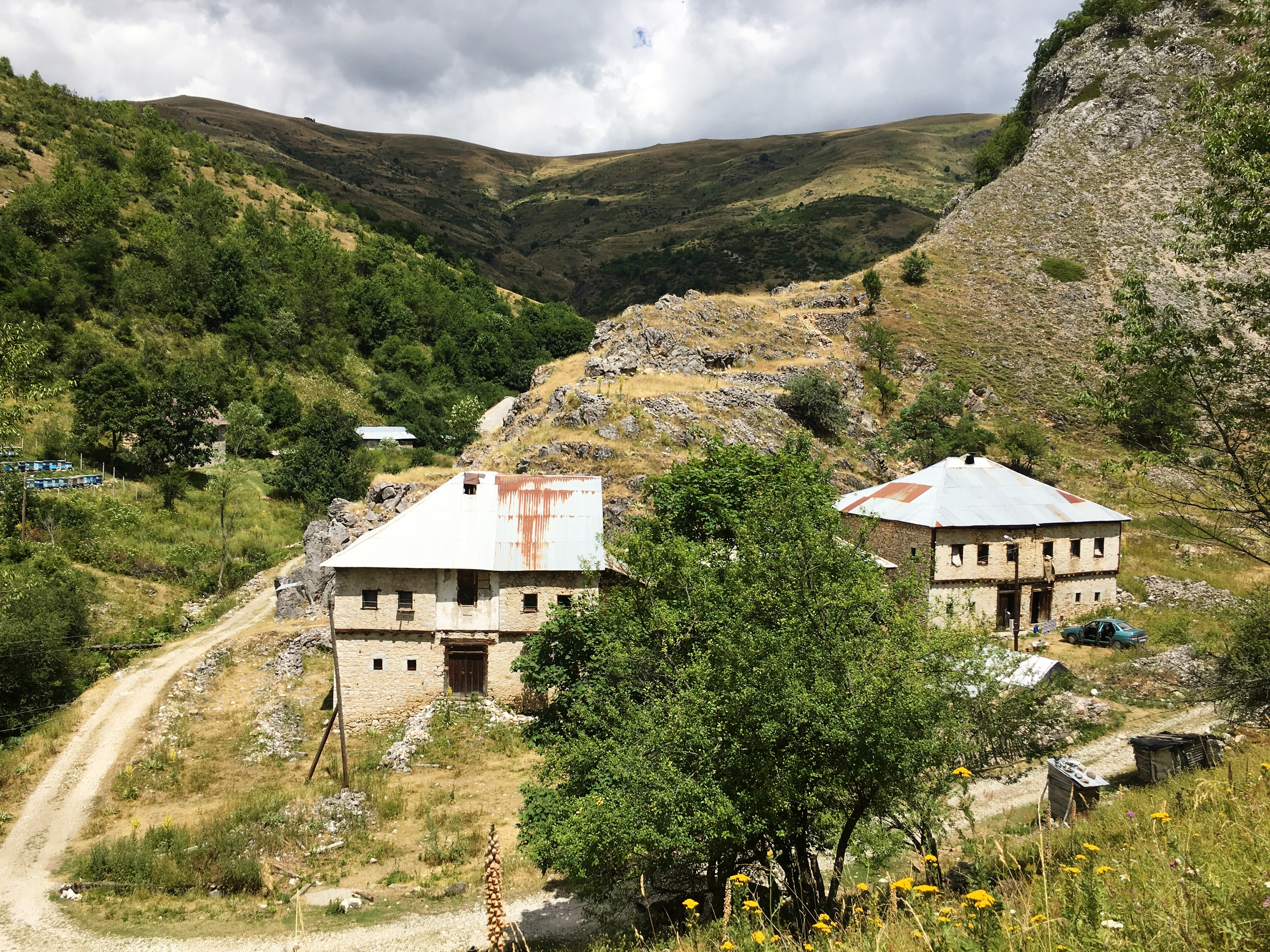

- Location within North Macedonia
- Coordinates: 41°47′11″N 20°41′11″E
- Country: North Macedonia
- Region: Polog
- Municipality: Gostivar

Population (2002)
  - Total: 7
- Time zone: UTC+1 (CET)
  - Summer (DST): UTC+2 (CEST)
- Car plates: GV
- Website: .

Brodec (Macedonian: Бродец, Albanian: Va, definite form: Vau) is a village in the municipality of Gostivar, North Macedonia.

== Demographics ==
Brodec (Brodec) is attested in the Ottoman defter of 1467 as a village in the ziamet of Reka. The village had 4 households and the anthroponyms recorded depicted an Albanian and mixed Slavic-Albanian character.

In statistics gathered by Vasil Kanchov in 1900, the village of Brodec was inhabited by 360 Christian Albanians and 150 Muslim Albanians. In 1905 in statistics gathered by Dimitar Mishev Brancoff, Brodec was inhabited by 450 Albanians and had a Bulgarian school. The Yugoslav census of 1953 recorded 171 people of whom 145 were Macedonians, 24 were Albanians and 2 others. The 1961 Yugoslav census recorded 182 people of whom were 133 Macedonians, 44 Albanians, 3 Turks and 2 others. The 1971 census recorded 119 people of whom were 88 Macedonians and 31 Albanians. The 1981 Yugoslav census recorded 70 people of whom were 56 Macedonians and 14 Albanians. The Macedonian census of 1994 recorded 8 Macedonians. According to the 2002 census, the village had a total of 7 inhabitants. Ethnic groups in the village include:

- Macedonians 7
