= Selišta, Bileća =

Coordinates: 42.9119°N 18.4158°E

Selišta
- Village
- Location within Republika Srpska
- Country: Bosnia and Herzegovina
- Entity: Republika Srpska
- Municipality: Bileća
- Time zone: UTC+1 (CET)
  - Summer (DST): UTC+2 (CEST)

Selišta (Serbian Cyrillic: Селишта) is a village in the municipality of Bileća, Republika Srpska, Bosnia and Herzegovina.
