= Bet-Meir Formation =

Geologic formation in the West Bank

- Stratigraphic range: Early Cenomanian
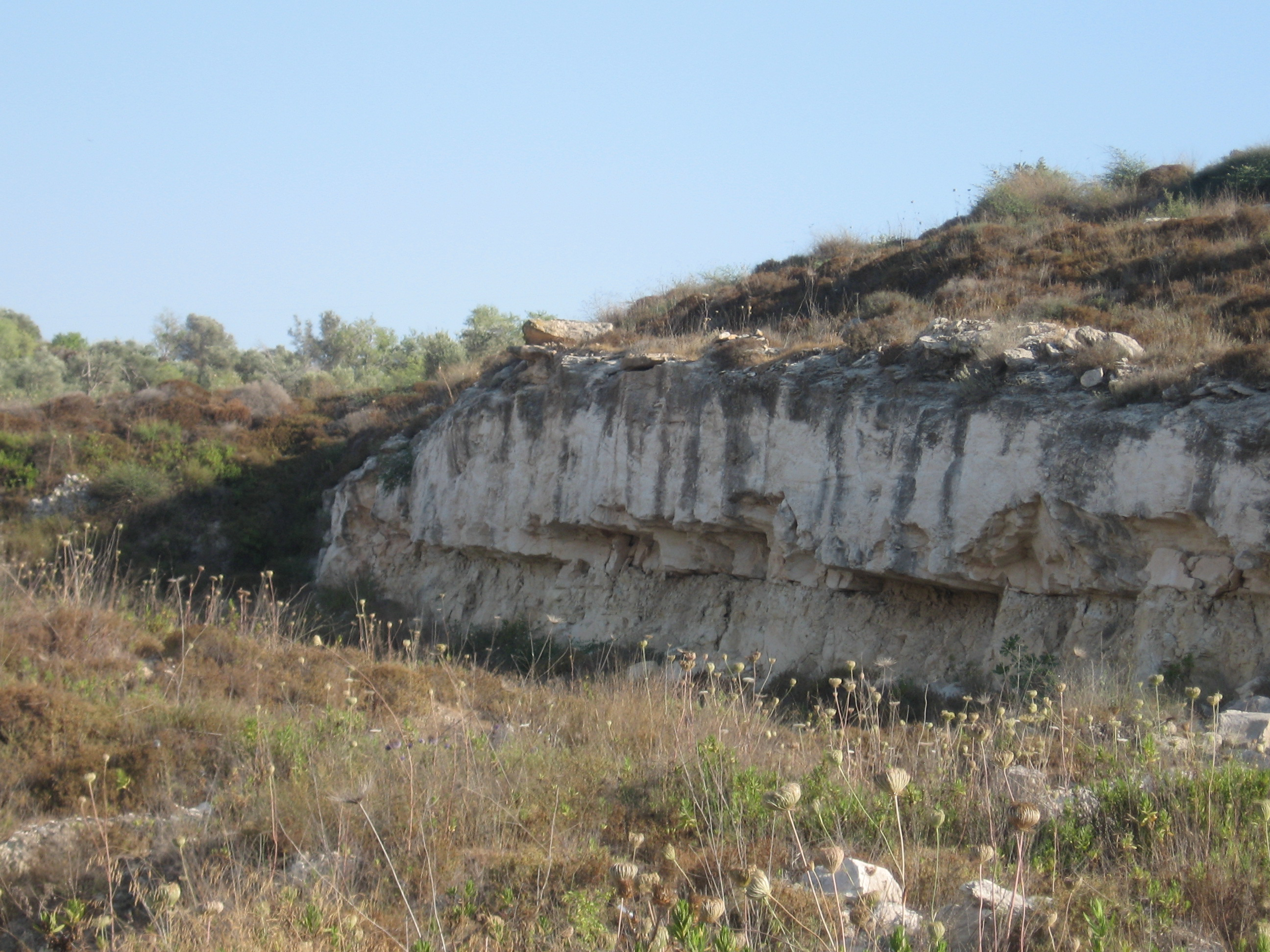
- Bet-Meir formation at Shomron
- Type: Geological formation
- Unit of: Judea Group
- Underlies: Amminadav Formation
- Overlies: Kesalon Formation
- Area: West Bank
- Thickness: Up to 60 m

Lithology
- Primary: Dolostone
- Other: Chalk, limestone, marl

Location
- Region: Judea and Samaria
- Country: Palestine
- Extent: Palestine (Judea and Samaria), west of Hebron, near Jericho

Type section
- Named for: Bet Meir
- Named by: Itzhaki et al., 1964

The Bet-Meir Formation is a Late Cretaceous sedimentary unit exposed in the central highlands of the West Bank (Palestine). It belongs to the regional Judea Group and records sedimentation on a broad, shallow marine carbonate platform along the southern margin of the Tethys Ocean during the Early Cenomanian.

The formation is paleontologically significant. Vertebrate remains recovered from it include pterosaurs, several species of ray-finned fish, and early snakes. Many important specimens come from quarries near Ein Yabrud, north and east of Ramallah, where fossil-bearing beds occur close to the contact with the Amminadav Formation. Owing to the close stratigraphic relationship between the two units, it remains uncertain whether some of the vertebrate fossils should be assigned to the Bet-Meir Formation or to the overlying formation.

== Description ==
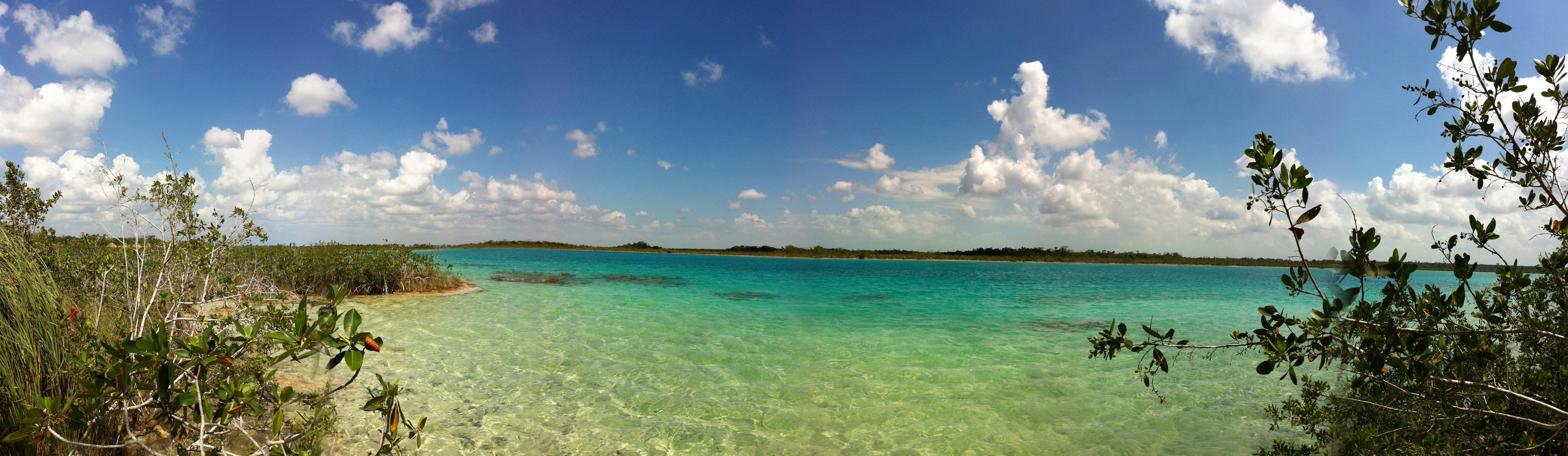
Modern analogue, Bacalar Lagoon

The formation represents a warm, tropical carbonate platform interior, positioned between fully open marine shelf environments and more continental marginal settings, being composed mainly of dolostone that accumulated in tidal-flat and restricted lagoonal settings. The area was under a greenhouse-climate shallow sea. The absence of relatively complete or articulated terrestrial plants suggests that the locality was either far from the nearest landfall or very arid. A good modern analogue is the Laguna Bacalar in Yucatán, as both settings share being a restricted circulation setting with abundant mud sitting on a carbonate platform.

In many areas, these dolostones laterally replace the chalks and limestones assigned to the En Yorqeam Formation, reflecting local environmental differences across the platform. The succession includes fine-grained dolomitic mudstones and siltstones, thin marly layers, laminated algal deposits, and occasional intraformational conglomerates. Features such as iron staining, erosion surfaces, and karstic cavities indicate periodic exposure of the sea floor during temporary drops in sea level. Much of the dolomitization is interpreted as secondary, linked to marine fluids circulating through the sediments during subsequent transgressive phases.

Stratigraphically, the Bet-Meir Formation rests on the Kesalon Formation, whose uppermost beds frequently show signs of erosion and hardground development. It is overlain by the slightly younger Amminadav Formation, characterized by more open-marine carbonate sedimentation and Rudist-bearing limestones. Because the transition between these two formations can be gradual and locally intertonguing, distinguishing their fossil content is sometimes problematic.

== Paleobiota ==
The majority of species here cannot be confidently assigned the Bet-Meir Formation, and some may instead belong to the younger Amminadav Formation.

=== Invertebrates ===
Unnamed material of Decapodans, Echinoids, Starfish, Cephalopods and Bivalvia are seen along the outcrops.

Genus	Species	Presence	Notes	Images
Graysonites	G. wacoense	Ein Yabrud quarries	Acanthoceratidae ammonite	
Stoliczkaiella	S. amanai	Ein Yabrud quarries	Acanthoceratidae ammonite	

=== Chondrichthyes ===
Genus	Species	Presence	Notes	Images
Batoidea	Indeterminate	Ein Yabrud quarries	Ray	

=== Bony Fish ===
Genus	Species	Presence	Notes	Images
Aipichthyoides	A. galeatus	Ein Yabrud quarries	An aipichthyoidid lamprimorph	
Aipichthyoides	A. formosus	Ein Yabrud quarries	An aipichthyoidid lamprimorph	
Dercetoides	D. venator	Ein Yabrud quarries	A dercetid aulopiform	
Enchodus	E. brevis	Ein Yabrud quarries	An enchodontid aulopiform	E. petrosus
Hastichthys	H. gracilis	Ein Yabrud quarries	A dercetid aulopiform	
Judeichthys	J. haasi	Ein Yabrud quarries	A gonorynchid	
Judeoberyx	J. princeps	Ein Yabrud quarries	A trachichthyoid trachichthyform	
Pachyamia	P. latimaxillaris	Ein Yabrud quarries	An amiid	
Pharmacichthys	P. judensis	Ein Yabrud quarries	A pharmacichthyid lamprimorph	Life restoration of Pharmacichthys
Ramallichthys	R. orientalis	Ein Yabrud quarries	A gonorynchid	
Rhombichthys	R. intoccabilis	Ein Yabrud quarries	A paraclupeid clupeomorph	Life restoration of Rhombichthys
Saurorhamphus	S. judeaensis	Ein Yabrud quarries	A eurypholid aulopiform	
Scalacurvichthys	S. naishi	Ein Yabrud quarries	A pycnodontid	Life restoration of Scalacurvichthys
Serrilepis	S. longidens	Ein Yabrud quarries	A halecid aulopiform	
Yabrudichthys	Y. striatus	Ein Yabrud quarries	An enchodontoid aulopiform	

=== Turtles ===
Genus	Species	Presence	Notes	Images
Algorachelus	A. parva	Ein Yabrud quarries	A bothremyid side-necked turtle	
Pelomedusidae	indet.	Ein Yabrud quarries	An indeterminate pelomedusid side-necked turtle	

=== Squamates ===
Genus	Species	Presence	Notes	Images
Haasiasaurus	H. gittelmani	Ein Yabrud quarries	An early mosasaur	
Haasiophis	H. terrasanctus	Ein Yabrud quarries	A simoliophiid snake, notable for its hindlimbs	
Mesoleptos	M. zendrinii	Ein Yabrud quarries	A basal mosasauroid	Life restoration of Mesoleptos
Pachyrhachis	P. problematicus	Ein Yabrud quarries	A simoliophiid snake, notable for its hindlimbs	

=== Pterosaurs ===
Genus	Species	Presence	Notes	Images
Pterodactyloidea	indet.	Ein Yabrud quarries	An indeterminate pterosaur	

=== Flora ===
The dominant component of the flora are encrusting green algae, while terrestrial flora is composed almost exclusively by leaves and stalks or stems of a mangrove gymnosperm (very likely Weichselia based on regional abundance).

== See also ==
- List of pterosaur-bearing stratigraphic units
