= Amminadav Formation =

Geologic formation in the West Bank

- Stratigraphic range: Late Cretaceous (Early Cenomanian)
- Type: Geological formation
- Overlies: Bet-Meir Formation

Location
- Country: Palestine

The Amminadav Formation is a Mesozoic geologic formation in the West Bank (Palestine). Pterosaur fossils have been recovered from the formation, in addition to several ray-finned fish and early snakes, most of which are known from the Ein Yabrud quarries. The formation overlies the just slightly older Bet-Meir Formation, and it is uncertain whether most of the paleobiota belong to one formation or the other.

== Paleobiota ==
The majority of species here cannot be confidently assigned the Amminadav Formation, and some may instead belong to the older Bet-Meir formation.

=== Fish ===
Genus	Species	Presence	Notes	Images
Aipichthyoides	A. galeatus A. formosus		An aipichthyoidid lamprimorph	
Dercetoides	D. venator		A dercetid aulopiform	
Hastichthys	H. gracilis		A dercetid aulopiform	
Enchodus	E. brevis		An enchodontid aulopiform	
Judeichthys	J. haasi		A gonorynchid	
Judeoberyx	J. princeps		A trachichthyoid trachichthyform	
Pachyamia	P. latimaxillaris		An amiid	
Parenchodus	P. longipterygius		An enchodontid aulopiform	
Pharmacichthys	P. judensis		A pharmacichthyid lamprimorph	
Ramallichthys	R. orientalis		A gonorynchid	
Rhombichthys	R. intoccabilis		A paraclupeid clupeomorph	
Saurorhamphus	S. judeaensis		A eurylophid aulopiform	
Scalacurvichthys	S. naishi		A pycnodontid	
Serrilepis	S. longidens		A halecid aulopiform	
Yabrudichthys	Y. striatus		An enchodontoid aulopiform	

=== Reptiles ===
==== Turtles ====
Genus	Species	Presence	Notes	Images
Algorachelus	A. parvus		A bothremyid side-necked turtle	
Pelomedusidae	indet.		An indeterminate pelomedusid side-necked turtle	

==== Squamates ====
Genus	Species	Presence	Notes	Images
Haasiasaurus	H. gittelmani		An early mosasaur	
Haasiophis	H. terrasanctus		A simoliophiid snake, notable for its hindlimbs	
Mesoleptos	M. zendrinii		A basal mosasauroid	
Pachyrhachis	P. problematicus		A simoliophiid snake, notable for its hindlimbs	

==== Pterosaurs ====
Genus	Species	Presence	Notes	Images
Pterosauria	indet.		An indeterminate pterosaur	

== See also ==
- List of pterosaur-bearing stratigraphic units
