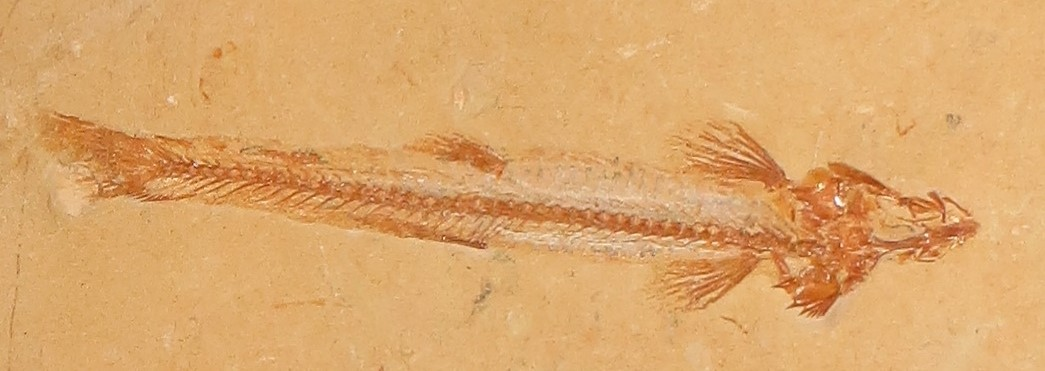
- Charitopsis spinosus Museo Scienze Naturali di Faenza

Scientific classification
- Kingdom: Animalia
- Phylum: Chordata
- Class: Actinopterygii
- Order: Gonorynchiformes
- Family: Gonorynchidae
- Genus: †Charitopsis; Gayet, 1993
- Species: †C. spinosus

Binomial name
- †Charitopsis spinosus Gayet, 1993

= Charitopsis (fish) =

Charitopsis Temporal range: Late Cenomanian

Extinct genus of fishes

Charitopsis is an extinct genus of prehistoric marine ray-finned fish that lived during the lower Cenomanian. It was a relative of modern beaked salmons. It contains a single species, C. spinosus from the Sannine Formation of Lebanon. It is possibly related to the sympatric gonorynchid Charitosomus, although some anatomical traits are more similar to the Cenozoic gonorynchids (Notogoneus and Gonorynchus itself).

== See also ==
- Prehistoric fish
- List of prehistoric bony fish
