= Judeichthys =

Judeichthys Temporal range: Lower Cenomanian

Scientific classification
- Kingdom: Animalia
- Phylum: Chordata
- Class: Actinopterygii
- Division: Teleostei
- Order: Gonorynchiformes
- Family: Gonorynchidae
- Genus: †Judeichthys; Gayet, 1985
- Species: †J. haasi

Binomial name
- †Judeichthys haasi Gayet, 1985

Extinct genus of fishes

Judeichthys is an extinct genus of prehistoric marine gonorynchiform ray-finned fish, related to modern beaked sandfish, that lived during the lower Cenomanian age of the Cretaceous. There is one currently known species, J. haasi, which was found in the Amminadav Formation near Ramallah in the West Bank, Palestine. The genus was named after the Judaean Mountains where it was discovered, while the species was named after professor Georg Haas. It reached a total length of about 12 centimetres (4.7 in).

During the description, the genus was placed in its own extinct family Judeichthyidae, but this has been refuted by later studies which place it in the extant Gonorynchidae. A 1996 study determined Judeichthys (alongside another co-occurring genus, Ramallichthys) to be synonymous with Charitosomus, a younger genus of Cretaceous gonorynchid known from Germany & Lebanon. A later study retained these as distinct, but suggested that Judeichthys may be synonymous with Ramallichthys.

== See also ==
- Prehistoric fish
- List of prehistoric bony fish
