= Charitopsis =

Charitopsis may refer to:

- Charitopsis (fish), an extinct genus of prehistoric bony fish
- Charitopsis (wasp), a wasp genus in the subfamily Encyrtinae
