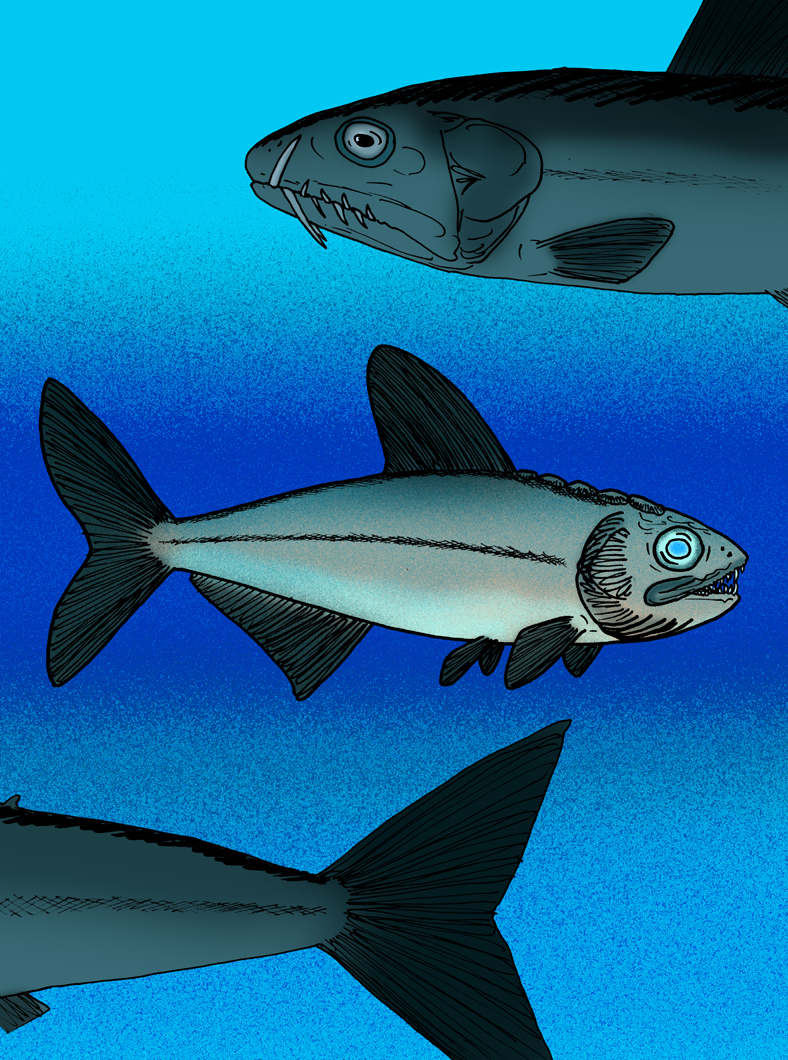
- V. avendanoi as compared to Enchodus

Scientific classification
- Kingdom: Animalia
- Phylum: Chordata
- Class: Actinopterygii
- Order: Aulopiformes
- Family: †Enchodontidae
- Genus: †Veridagon; Díaz Cruz et al. 2019

Type species
- Veridagon avendanoi Díaz Cruz et al. 2019

= Veridagon =

Veridagon Temporal range: Cenomanian ~100–99 Ma

Extinct genus of ray-finned fishes

Veridagon avendanoi is an extinct aulopiform ray-finned fish related to species of Enchodus from the Cenomanian-aged Cintalapa Formation, exposed in El Chango Quarry, Chiapas, Mexico. Its original generic name was Dagon; however, this name was preoccupied by a group of South American butterflies. The generic name was eventually amended to Veridagon.

== Etymology ==
The original generic name refers to both Dagon, the fish god of the Philistines, and the Lovecraft character. The amended generic name has the added suffix "veri," derived from the Latin, verus, meaning "true" or "real."

== Appearance ==
The holotype and only specimen is 220 millimetres (8.7 in) long. It depicts a fusiform animal similar in anatomy to Enchodus, with a series of small dorsally placed plates on the roof of its head.
