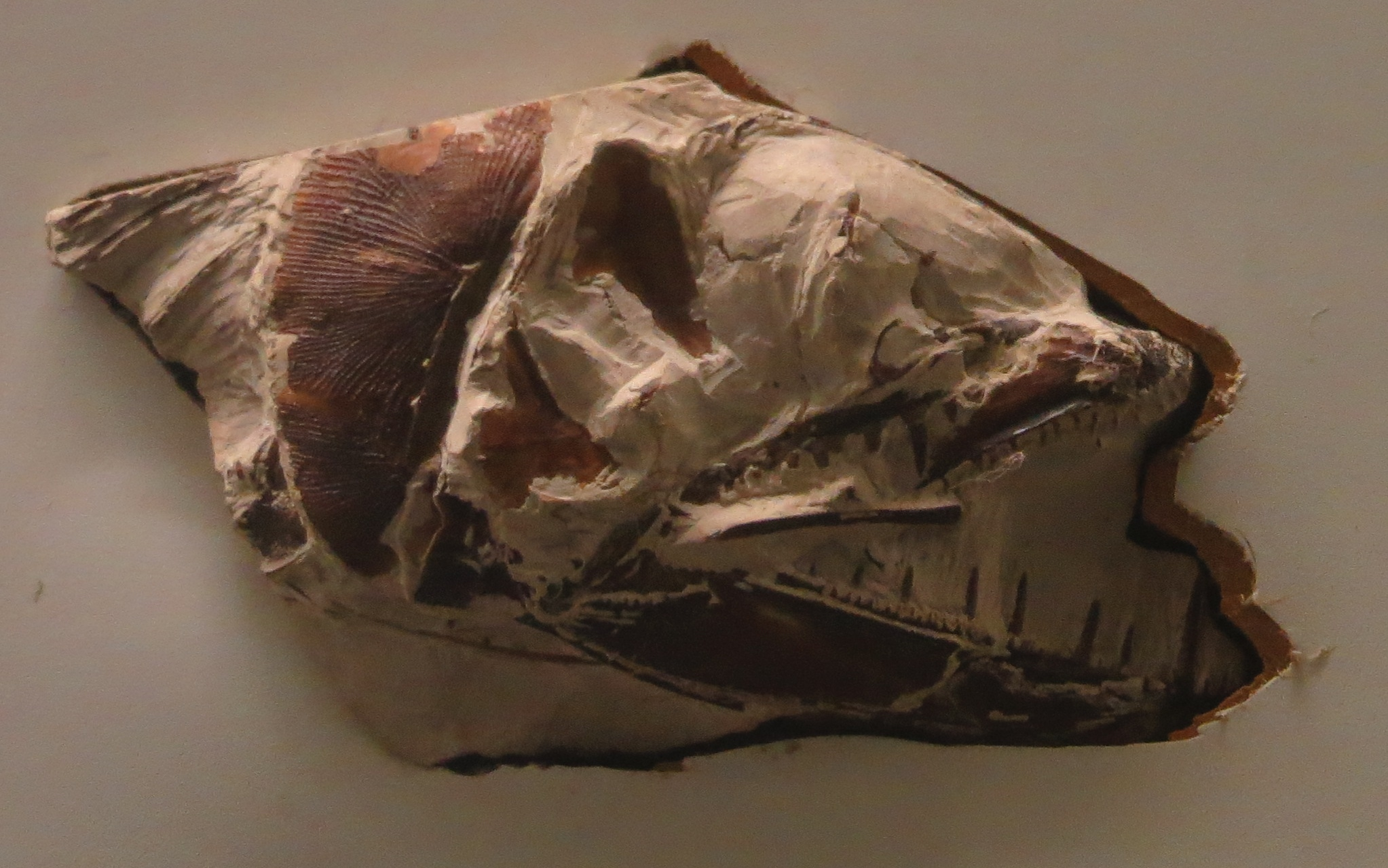
- Skull of Enchodus lewesiensis

Scientific classification
- Kingdom: Animalia
- Phylum: Chordata
- Class: Actinopterygii
- Order: Aulopiformes
- Suborder: †Enchodontoidei
- Family: †Enchodontidae; Lydekker in Nicholson and Lydekker, 1889

Subgroups
- †Rharbichthys?; †Palaeolycus; †Unicachichthys; †Veridagon; †Enchodontinae Fielitz, 2004; †Calypsoichthys; †Enchodus; †Parenchodus; †Eurypholinae Fielitz, 2004; †Eurypholis; †Saurorhamphus; †Vegrandichthys

= Enchodontidae =

Enchodontidae Temporal range: Albian–Maastrichtian

Extinct family of ray-finned fish

Enchodontidae is an extinct family of marine enchodontoid aulopiform ray-finned fish from the Cretaceous to potentially the Eocene, being found worldwide. The family itself was diverse within its body form though unlike other enchodontoids, most genera within the family possessed rows of scutes behind the head and sides of the body. Like a large amount of extinct groups, the origin of enchodontids have remained obscured though this is mostly due to a large diversification event that happened in the Late Aptian to Middle Cenomanian. Though the family is diverse in their range and anatomy, all known members were predatory with most living in more shallow, near-shore environments.

== History ==
Though the family itself was erected in 1901, a number of members of the group were previously described by Agassiz and other authors. Remains of enchodontids where for a long time only known from North America and Europe and still very commonly found there. Over the last few decades, material has now been found in other regions including South America, Asia, and Africa which has expanded their biogeographic range. One of the most notable of these more recent finds is the description of various genera from the El Chango quarry located in southeastern Mexico.

== Anatomy ==
=== Skull ===
The diversity within the cranial morphology of Enchodontidae is extreme with some genera like Saurorhamphus having long, thin skulls while other have short, wide skull which have been described as pug-nosed. Even with this being the case, there are some traits that are consistent within the group. One of the more noticeable examples of this is a lack of a supraorbital or interopercle bone. A bar strengthening the opercle is also seen in enchodontids along with ornamentation made up of tubercles present on the opercle and subopercle. Though uncommon in the group, taxa such as Unicachichthys and Vegrandichthys possess a posterior spine on their preopercles. This is in contrast to the generally smooth borders seen in other genera. One of the most well known features of the family is the presence of one or more pairs of fang like teeth on their dermopalatine with coupled symphysial "fangs" on the mandible.

=== Postcrania ===
Members of Enchodontidae have fusiform, generally scaleless bodies with a row of dorsal scutes between the base of the skull and the dorsal fin. These scutes, along with spines seen on the lateral line of some genera like Saurorhamphus, have been proposed to act as protection from other fish. Just like the skulls of enchodontids, the postcrania varies wildly between genera with the most notable difference being the body length. The body length ranges from elongate with body lengths more similar to modern genera like Anotopterus to more shortened body forms. Just like modern members of the group, enchodontids would have had an adipose fin towards the back of the body, between the dorsal and caudal fin.

== Classification ==
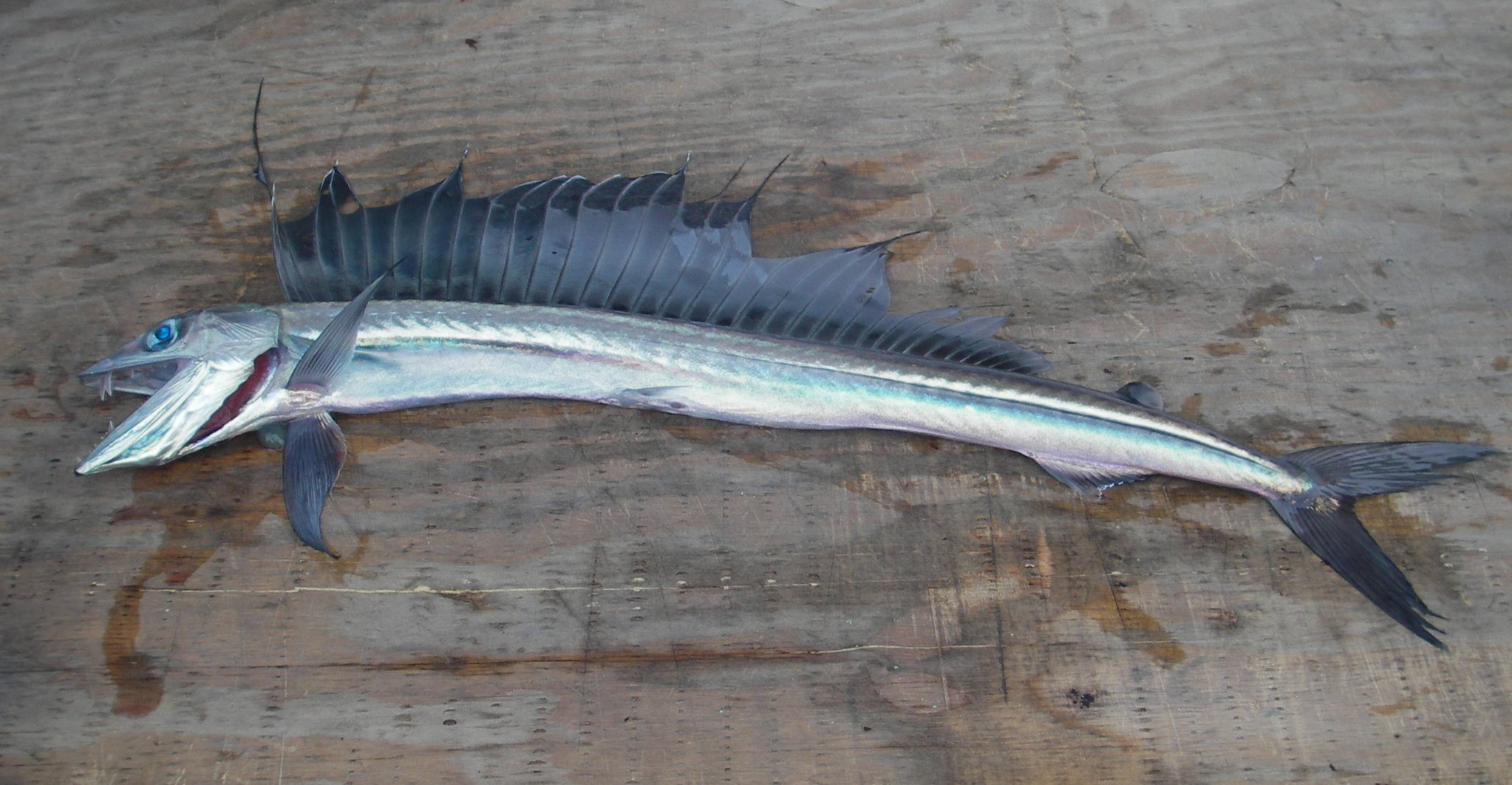
Alepisaurus, a member of the suborder Alepisauroidei. A group believed to be close relatives of enchodontids.

In a paper by Woodward in 1901, the superfamily Enchodontoidea along with the family Enchodontidae were erected. In this paper, he split the family into two groups based on the presence or lack of a single tooth on the palatine. Woodward suggested that the closest living relatives of this group were the families Evermannellidae (at the time referred to as "Odontostomidae") and Alepisauridae. After Woodward's paper, the relation of enchodontids to modern fish groups was debated by various authors with authors such as Arambourg agreeing with his placement of the family near Alepisauridae though they placed the family within the suborder Iniomi while others placed it within the former suborder Isospondyli. In 1940, when Berg synonymized Isospondyli with Clupeiformes, Enchodontoidei was placed within Clupeiformes. Another alternative placement of the group was made by Goody in 1969 which placed Enchodontoidei as a whole within the order Salmoniformes. In 1973 Rosen erected the order Aulopiformes which contained 15 living families along with 15 fossil genera, one of these fossil genera being Enchodus. However, in this original paper, the fossil genera where not placed within any specific families. Finally, in 1994, Nelson reranked the clades within Enchodontoidei including Enchodontidae. In more some recent publications, such as Nelson (2016), Enchodontidae has been placed into the suborder Alepisauroidei rather than Enchodontoidei.

Enchodontidae itself is commonly considered monophyletic with various studies over the recent years strengthening that idea, with the most comprehensive of these being Fielitz (2004). Within this paper, the family were defined by three synapomorphies with them being a lack of an interopercle, the single dermopalatine tooth mention in earlier studies, and the dermopalatine bone being either shorter or the same length as the tooth. Members of Enchodontidae were placed within four subfamilies being Enchodontinae, Eurypholinae, Palaeolycinae, and Rharbichthinae. Within this study, Alepisauridae was placed as sister to a clade containing the extinct families Enchodontidae and Cimolichthyidae. In contrast to the study by Flielitz, the genus Veridagon has been placed within the family even with the presence of the a second dermopalatine tooth so the synapomorphic status of the feature has been questioned. Even with this being the case, the family has continued to be considered a monophyletic group. Other studies since Flietz such as Silva and Gallo (2011) also suggest that the presence of dorsal scutes, a horizontal strengthening bar on the opercle, and presence of anteroventral prongs on the mandible are more accurate synapomorphies of the family.

Flielitz(2004)

- Enchodontidae
  - Palaeolycus
  - - Rharbichthys
    - - - Eurypholis
        - Saurorhamphus
      - - Enchodus marchesettii
        - - - Enchodus brevis
            - Enchodus lewesiensis
            - Parenchodus
          - - - Enchodus shumardi
              - Enchodus venator
            - - Enchodus gracilis
              - - Enchodus petrosus
                - - Enchodus dirus
                  - Enchodus gladiolus

== Evolutionary history ==
=== Origins and Diversification ===
Authors such as Fielitz have suggested that the family could have originated in the eastern Tethys Sea during middle Cenomanian, only for them to expand in range due to multiple dispersion events. During this time, there are two areas containing a large number of endemic enchodontids, these being the Middle East and North Africa which has been one main factors supporting this concept. This suggestion also comes from the presence of early species of Encodus being found in the same fauna as multiple more derived genera. Due to a seemingly rapid radiation of the family during the Late Aptian and Middle Cenomanian, it has been difficult to understand the group's origin. By the Middle Cenomanian multiple genera already had large ranges which, in some cases, spanned the entire Tethys Sea. More recent studies on the Mexican members of the family counter this idea due to some of the most basal and earliest members being found there. This would instead suggest that the family could have arose in the western region of the Tethys, or at least had played a key role in their evolution.

=== Extinction ===
Just like a large amount of other groups of fish, the extinction of enchodontids is largely attributed to the Cretaceous Mass Extinction. Even with this event happening, fragmentary remains identified as being from Enchodus have been described from the lower Eocene subsurface beds of the Cambay Shale in Gujarat, India. Another Indian site within the Akli Formation also preserves material comparable to Enchodus elegans with the remains of this genus being a common part of the lower Eocene fauna. Though this Eocene material is made up of isolated teeth, it does suggest the survival of the genus past the Mass Extinction. A potential reason for this extinction is a mix of factors with the most straight forward one being that their larger size towards the end of the Cretaceous left them more vulnerable to the extinction event. The other factor is due to the collapse of marine ecosystems due to a rapid drop in the amount of microorganisms like nannoplankton, which would have caused a collapse of the higher parts of the pelagic food webs.

== Paleoecology ==
Though not well studied within many members of the family, enchodontids were generally good swimmers which largely lived in more shallow coastal environments within epicontinental seaways. In Grandstaff et al. (1990) the sturdiness of the skull elements along with the abrasion of the dermopalatine teeth was evidence of a diet of cephalopods which has been corroborated by a well preserved skull. It has been further proposed by Schein et al. (2013) that variation seen between species may show different feeding strategies or niche partitioning. Another genus, Saurorhamphus, has been found with a half-digested fish in stomach suggesting that a large amount of enchodontids were most likely predators. Unlike Enchodus however, Saurorhamphus may have been an ambush predator based on its fin and head morphology and along with the seeming reduction of muscle in the body. They were also important members of the Cretaceous marine food webs, with fossil remains known from the gut contents of diverse predators such as larger fish, cephalopods, and plesiosaurs.

== Paleoenvironment ==
Enchodontids were a widespread family of fish with remains being found in temperate coastal environments worldwide unlike deeper-water extant relatives like Alepisaurus. The most famous genus in the family, Enchodus, is thought to have lived in environments above 200m with larger species in the genus having been suggested to be epipelagic.
