= Gonorhynchus =

Gonorhynchus is a synonymous genus name for fish. The name can refer to two types of fish:

- Gonorhynchus McClelland, 1839; a synonymous name for several genera of Labeoninae
- A common misspelling (lapsus calami) of Gonorynchus Scopoli, 1777
