= Judeoberyx =

Judeoberyx Temporal range: Cenomanian

Scientific classification
- Kingdom: Animalia
- Phylum: Chordata
- Class: Actinopterygii
- Division: Teleostei
- Order: Beryciformes
- Genus: †Judeoberyx; Gayet, 1980
- Species: †J. princeps

Binomial name
- †Judeoberyx princeps Gayet, 1980

Extinct genus of fishes

Judeoberyx is an extinct genus of prehistoric marine trachichthyiform ray-finned fish that lived during the Late Cretaceous (Cenomanian). It contains a single species, J. princeps, from the Amminadav/Bet-Meir Formation of the West Bank.

== See also ==
- Prehistoric fish
- List of prehistoric bony fish
