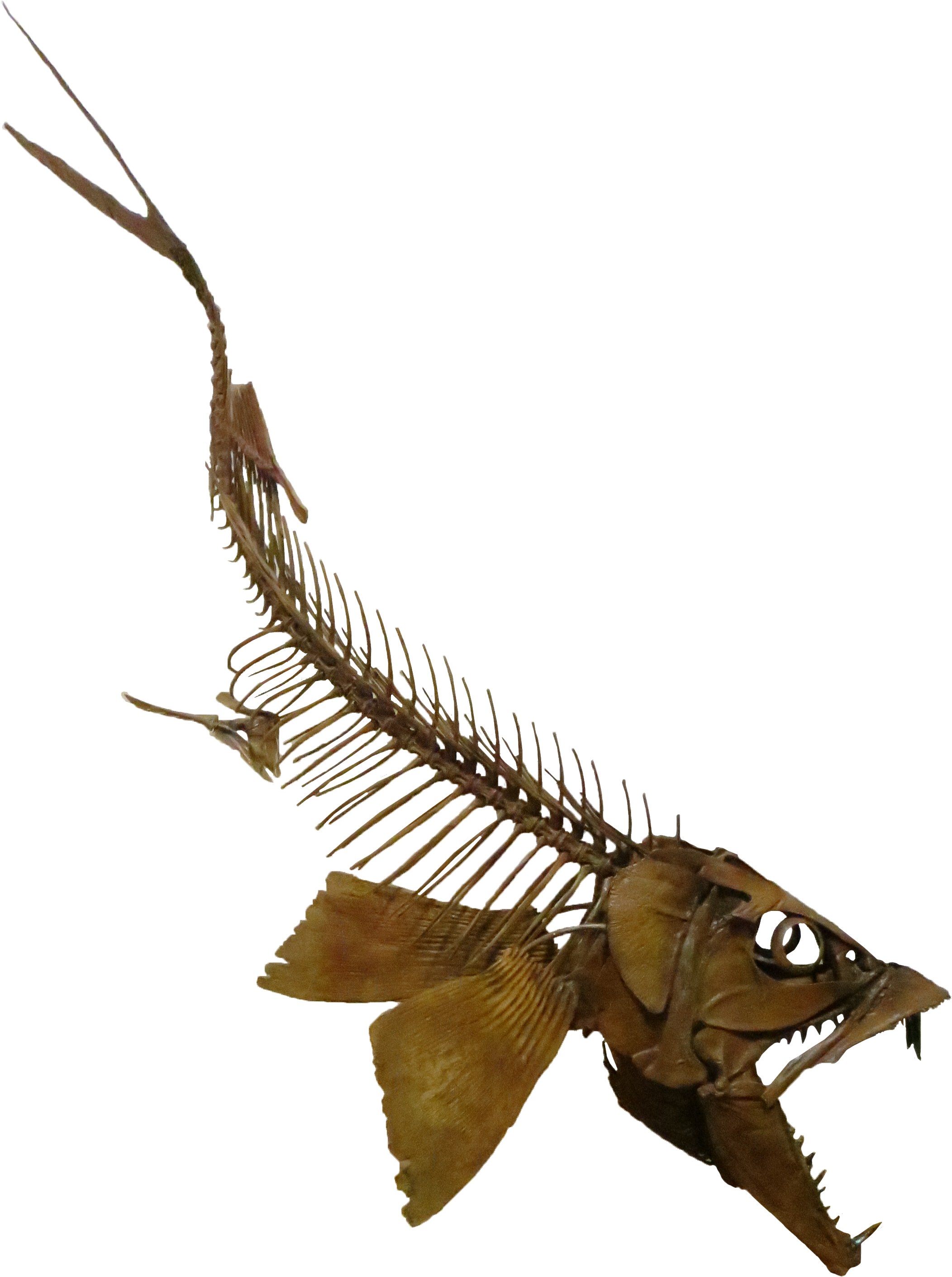
- E. petrosus mounted skeleton cast, Rocky Mountain Dinosaur Resource Center

Scientific classification
- Kingdom: Animalia
- Phylum: Chordata
- Class: Actinopterygii
- Division: Teleostei
- Order: Aulopiformes
- Family: †Enchodontidae
- Genus: †Enchodus; Agassiz, 1835

Type species
- †Esox lewesiensis Mantell, 1822

Species
- ~26+, see text

Synonyms
- Isodus Heckel, 1849; Phasganodus Leidy, 1857; Ischyrocephalus von der Marck, 1858; Solenodon Kramberger, 1881 (preocc.); ?Tetheodus Cope, 1874; Holcodon Kramberger, 1885; Eurygnathus Davis, 1887 (preocc.)

= Enchodus =

Enchodus Temporal range: Albian-Maastrichtian ~105–66 Ma Possible Barremian & Paleogene records

Extinct genus of ray-finned fishes

Enchodus (from Greek: ἔγχος enchos, 'spear' and Greek: ὀδούς odoús 'tooth') is an extinct genus of aulopiform ray-finned fish related to lancetfish and lizardfish. Species of Enchodus flourished during the Late Cretaceous, where they were a widespread component of marine ecosystems worldwide, and there is some evidence that they may have survived to the Paleocene or Eocene; however, this may just represent reworked Cretaceous material.

== Description ==
Enchodus species were small to medium in size, with E. zinensis reaching 172.2 centimetres (67.8 in) long. One of the genus' most notable attributes are the large "fangs" at the front of the upper and lower jaws and on the palatine bones, leading to its misleading nickname among fossil hunters and paleoichthyologists, "the saber-toothed herring". These fangs, along with a long sleek body and large eyes, suggest Enchodus was a predatory species.

E. petrosus, with standard length around 76.7 centimetres (30.2 in) and sometimes over 1 metre (3 ft 3 in), is known from common remains coming from the Niobrara Chalk, the Mooreville Chalk Formation, the Pierre Shale, and other geological formations deposited within the Western Interior Seaway and the Mississippi Embayment. Large individuals of this species had fangs measuring over 6 centimetres (2.4 in) in length, giving its skull an appearance somewhat reminiscent of modern deep-sea fishes, such as anglerfish and viperfish. Other species, such as E. parvus, were considerably smaller, measuring only some centimetres (a few inches) long.

Although Enchodus remains are among the most common Late Cretaceous bony fish fossils known worldwide, articulated specimens are relatively rare in North America, where the largest species are known from. The most complete Enchodus specimen from North America is the skeleton of an E. petrosus from the Pierre Shale of Wyoming & South Dakota, US. Other relatively complete or articulated skulls of are known of E. ferox from the Ripley Formation of Alabama and E. petrosus from the Austin Chalk of Texas. In 2026, the largest articulated Enchodus skull was described from an E. petrosus from the Bearpaw Formation of Alberta. The individual this skull belonged has been estimated as reaching 1.5 metres (4 ft 11 in) in total length.

Despite being a formidable predator, remains of Enchodus are commonly found among the stomach contents of larger predators, including sharks, other bony fish, mosasaurs, plesiosaurs and seabirds such as Baptornis advenus.

== Distribution ==
Enchodus fossils have been found all over the world. In North America, Enchodus remains have been recovered from most US states with fossiliferous Late Cretaceous rocks, including Kansas, Nebraska, Colorado, Alabama, Mississippi, Georgia, Tennessee, Wyoming, Texas, California, North Carolina, and New Jersey. Fossils also have been found in the Aguja and El Doctor Formations of Mexico and the Ashville, Vermillion River and Dinosaur Park Formations, and Brown Bed Member of Canada. The taxon is also known from coeval strata in Mexico, South America (Tiupampan Santa Lucía Formation and Maastrichtian El Molino Formation of Bolivia, Paraíba, Pernambuco and Sergipe states of Brazil, as well as Argentina, Chile, and Peru), Africa (Egypt, Morocco, the Congo, Angola, Niger, and Equatorial Guinea), the Middle East (Saudi Arabia, Lebanon, Israel, Palestine and Jordan), Europe (England, France, the Netherlands, Belgium, Spain, Italy, Germany, Sweden, the Czech Republic, Slovenia, Greece, Ukraine and Russia), India, and Japan. Potentially the latest Enchodus remains are known from the earliest Eocene of Barmer, India. However, it has also been suggested that all post-Cretaceous Enchodus records are just reworked material.

== Taxonomy ==
Species of Enchodus are generally classified into two different clades, the North American and the Mediterranean. It has been proposed that this distinction is the result of several isolated events between the two populations over the Late Cretaceous. The earliest known species is E. zimapanensis from the late Albian-aged El Doctor Formation of Mexico. Potentially earlier remains are known from the late Barremian/early Aptian of Brazil (Morro de Chaves Formation), but these specimens are too fragmentary to confidently assign to this genus.

=== Species ===
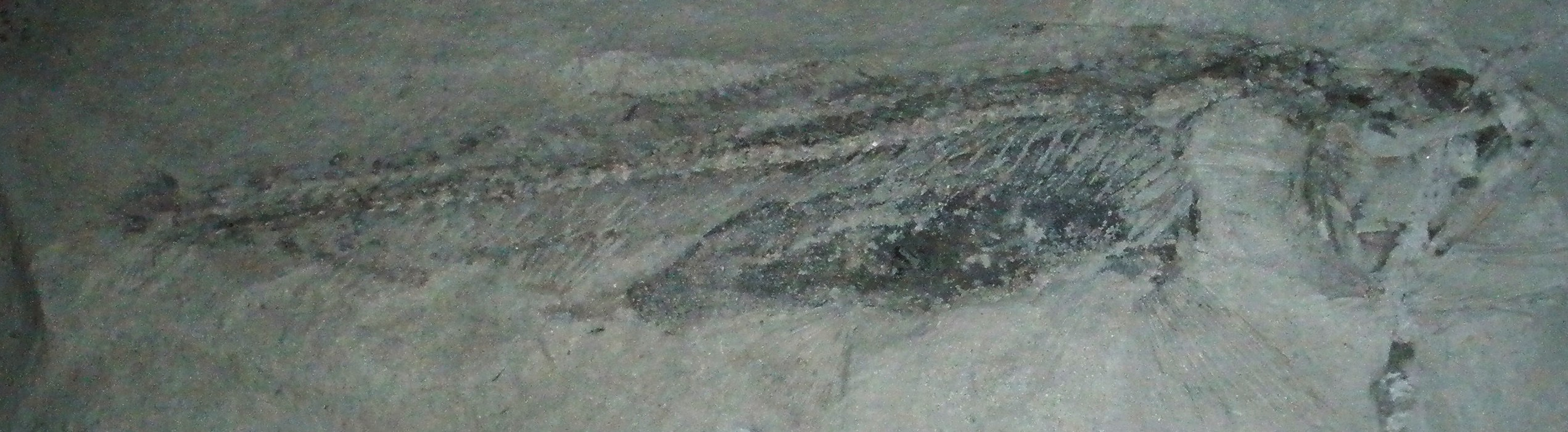
Specimen of E. gracilis

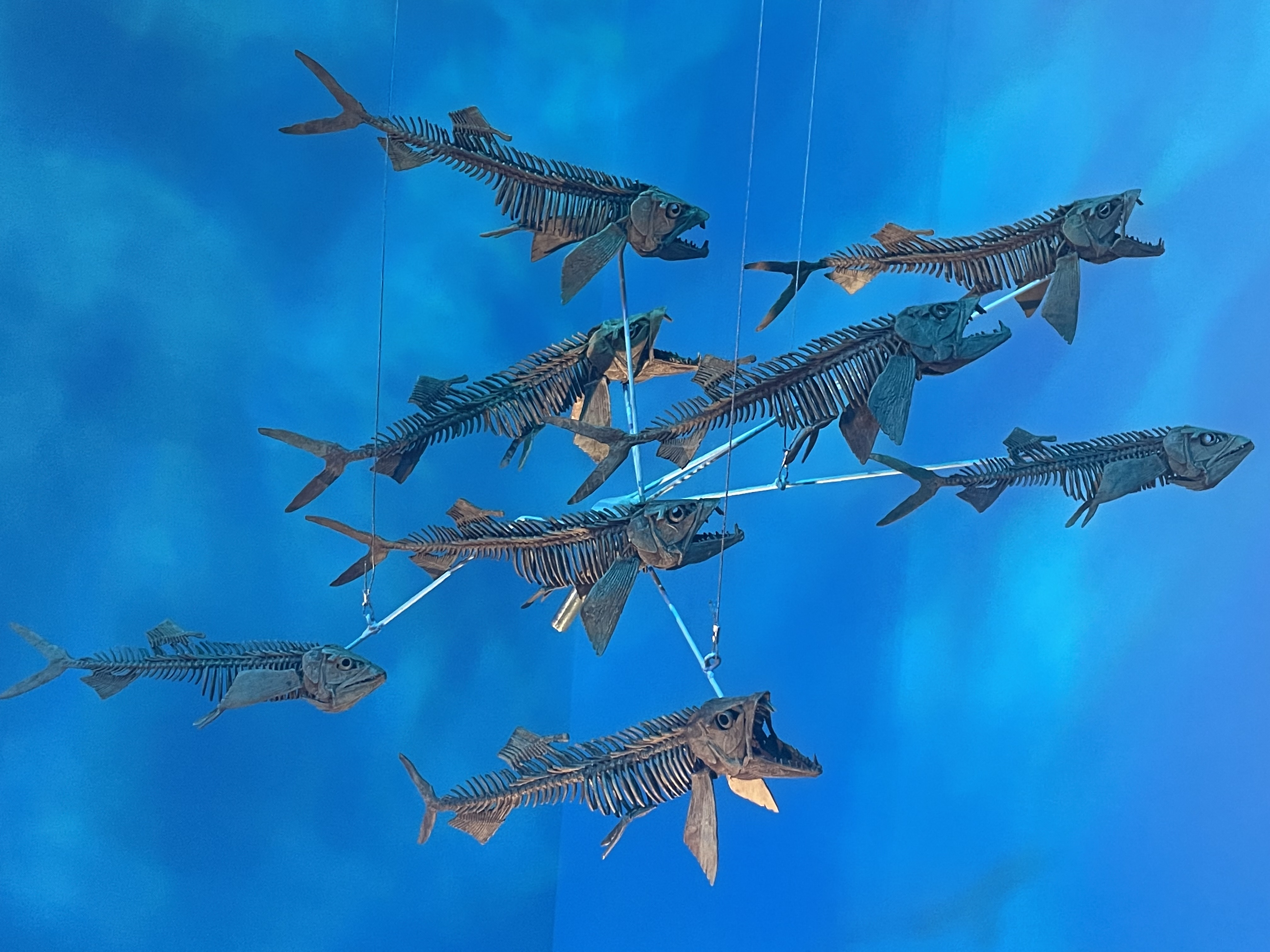
Reconstructed school of E. petrosus

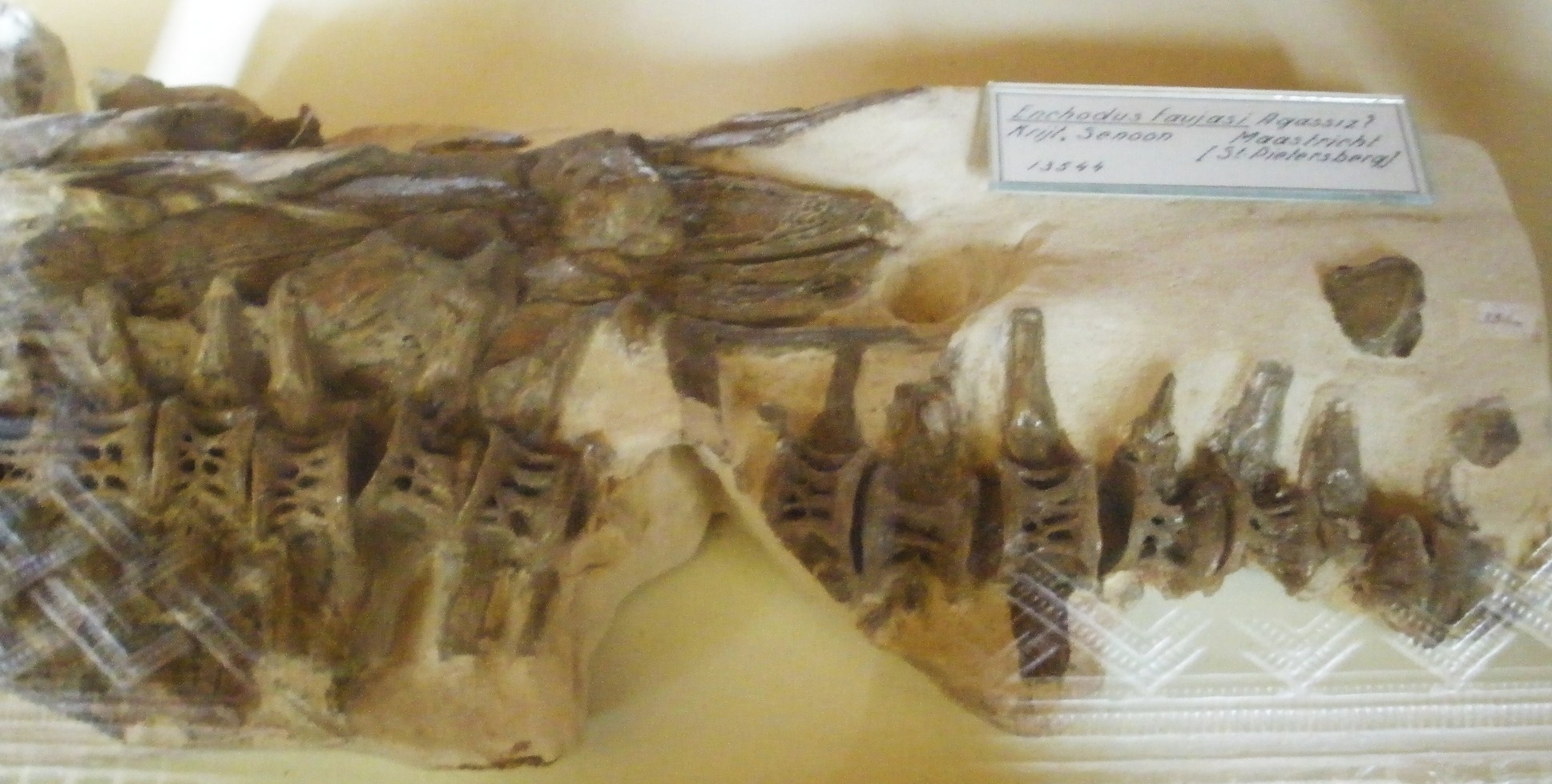
Specimen of E. faujasi

Enchodus was a diverse, long-lived genus with many species known throughout its temporal and geographic range. The following valid species are known:

- E. brevis Chalifa, 1989 - Cenomanian of the West Bank, Palestine (Amminadav Formation), potentially Lebanon (Sannine Formation)
- E. bursauxi (Arambourg, 1952) - Coniacian of Angola (Itombe Formation), Late Campanian of Egypt, Maastrichtian to potentially Danian of Morocco (Ouled Abdoun Basin)
- E. dentex (Heckel, 1856) - Cenomanian of Slovenia (Komen Limestone)
- E. elegans Dartevelle & Casier 1949 - Coniacian of Angola (Itombe Formation), Maastrichtian of Brazil (Gramame Formation), Niger, Syria, and Jordan (Alhisa Phosphorite Formation); Maastrichtian to potentially Danian of Morocco (Ouled Abdoun Basin)
- E. faujasi Agassiz, 1843 - Coniacian of Angola (Itombe Formation), Campanian of Israel (Mishash Formation), Maastrichtian of France (Calcarintes du Jadet Formation), Maastrichtian/potentially Danian of the Netherlands (Maastricht Formation)
- E. ferox Leidy, 1855 - Santonian of Orenburg, Russia; Campanian to Maastrichtian (potentially Paleocene) of the United States (Marshalltown, Mount Laurel, Navesink, and Hornerstown Formations of New Jersey, Marshalltown Formation of Delaware, Severn Formation of Maryland, Arkansas, Fox Hills Formation of North Dakota); Maastrichtian of Argentina (Jagüel Formation) and India (Intertrappean Beds)
- E. gladiolus (Cope, 1872) - Cenomanian to Maastrichtian of the United States (Greenhorn Limestone of Colorado, Kansas & Iowa, Graneros Shale & Carlile Shale of Nebraska, Mancos Shale of New Mexico, Carlile Shale of Kansas, Arkansas, Fox Hills Formation of North Dakota, and Merchantville, Navesink & Hornerstown Formations of New Jersey), Santonian to Campanian of Russia (Orenburg, Rybushka Formation), Maastrichtian of Argentina (Jagüel Formation), potentially Peru (Vivian Formation)
- E. gracilis (von der Marck, 1858) - Campanian of Germany (Ahlen Formation)
- E. lewesiensis (Mantell, 1822) (type species) - Cenomanian to Coniacian of England (English Chalk, Seaford Formation), Cenomanian/Turonian of Germany (Hesseltal Formation) and the Czech Republic, potentially Maastrichtian of Germany (Gerhardsreit Formation)
- E. libycus (Quaas, 1902) - Cenomanian to Maastrichtian of Brazil (Cotinguiba Formation, Gramame Formation), Campanian of Egypt, Maastrichtian to potentially Danian of Morocco (Ouled Abdoun Basin)
- E. longidens (Pictet, 1850) - Santonian of Lebanon (Sahel Alma), potentially Paleocene/early Eocene of India (Akli Formation)
- E. longipectoralis (Schaeffer, 1947) - Cenomanian to Coniacian of Brazil (Cotinguiba Formation)
- E. lycodon Kner, 1867 - Cenomanian of Slovenia (Komen Limestone)
- E. machairus Nelson, Murray & Sims, 2026 - Coniacian to Early Campanian of Kansas, US (Niobrara Formation)
- E. macropterus (von der Marck, 1863) - Campanian of Germany (Baumberge Formation)
- E. major Davis, 1887 - Santonian of Lebanon (Sahel Alma)
- E. marchesettii (Kramberger, 1895) - Cenomanian of Lebanon (Sannine Formation)
- E. mecoanalis Forey, Yi, Patterson & Davies, 2003 - Cenomanian of Lebanon (Sannine Formation)
- E. oliveirai Maury, 1930 - Cenomanian to Maastrichtian of Brazil (Cotinguiba & Gramame Formations)
- E. petrosus Cope, 1874 - Cenomanian to late Campanian/early Maastrichtian of the United States (Tokio Formation of Arkansas, Carlile Shale of Kansas, Niobrara Formation of South Dakota, Mooreville & Demopolis Chalk of Alabama, Blufftown Formation of Georgia, Tar Heel Formation of North Carolina, Donoho Creek Formation of South Carolina, Navesink Formation of New Jersey), Turonian of Canada (Northwest Territories), Santonian to Campanian of Russia (Orenburg & Rybushka Formation)
- E. shumardi Leidy, 1856 - Cenomanian to Santonian of the United States (Greenhorn Limestone of Iowa, Kansas & Colorado, Carlile & Graneros Shale of Nebraska & Kansas, Niobrara Formation of Kansas & South Dakota) and Canada (Ashville Formation of Saskatchewan, Kaskapau Formation of Alberta)
- E. subaequilateralis Cope, 1885 - Maastrichtian of Brazil (Gramame Formation)
- E. tineidae Holloway et al., 2017 - Campanian of Egypt (Duwi Formation)
- E. venator Arambourg, 1954 - Cenomanian of Morocco (Jbel Tselfat), Italy (Scaglia Variegata Alpina Formation), and Germany (Hesseltal Formation)
- E. zinensis Chalifa, 1996 - Campanian/Maastrichtian of Egypt
- E. zimapanensis Fielitz & González-Rodríguez, 2010 - Late Albian of Mexico (El Doctor Formation)

An undescribed species, previously tentatively assigned to the dubious species E. dirus, is known from the Maastrichtian of Gavdos, Greece. An indeterminate species, also previously assigned to E. dirus, is known from the Severn Formation of Maryland, US.

Many other dubious species based on insufficient remains have been described throughout its range. Even most of the valid Enchodus species are based on only isolated teeth and bones. For example, in 2026 the long-recognized species E. dirus (Leidy, 1857) was identified as a nomen dubium described from non-diagnostic remains. The genus Parenchodus, considered to be the sister genus of Enchodus, has been synonymized with this genus based on some studies. However, more recent studies have found it to be a valid genus distinct from Enchodus.

=== Phylogeny ===
Enchodus

- - Enchodus
    - E. marchesettii
    - - - Parenchodus
        - E. brevis
        - E. lewesiensis
      - - - - E. gracilis
            - - E. venator
              - E. shumardi
          - - E. petrosus
            - E. zipapanensis
            - E. faujasi
            - - E. gladiolus
              - - E. tineidae
                - E. dirus

Phylogeny of the genus with some species

== Gallery ==
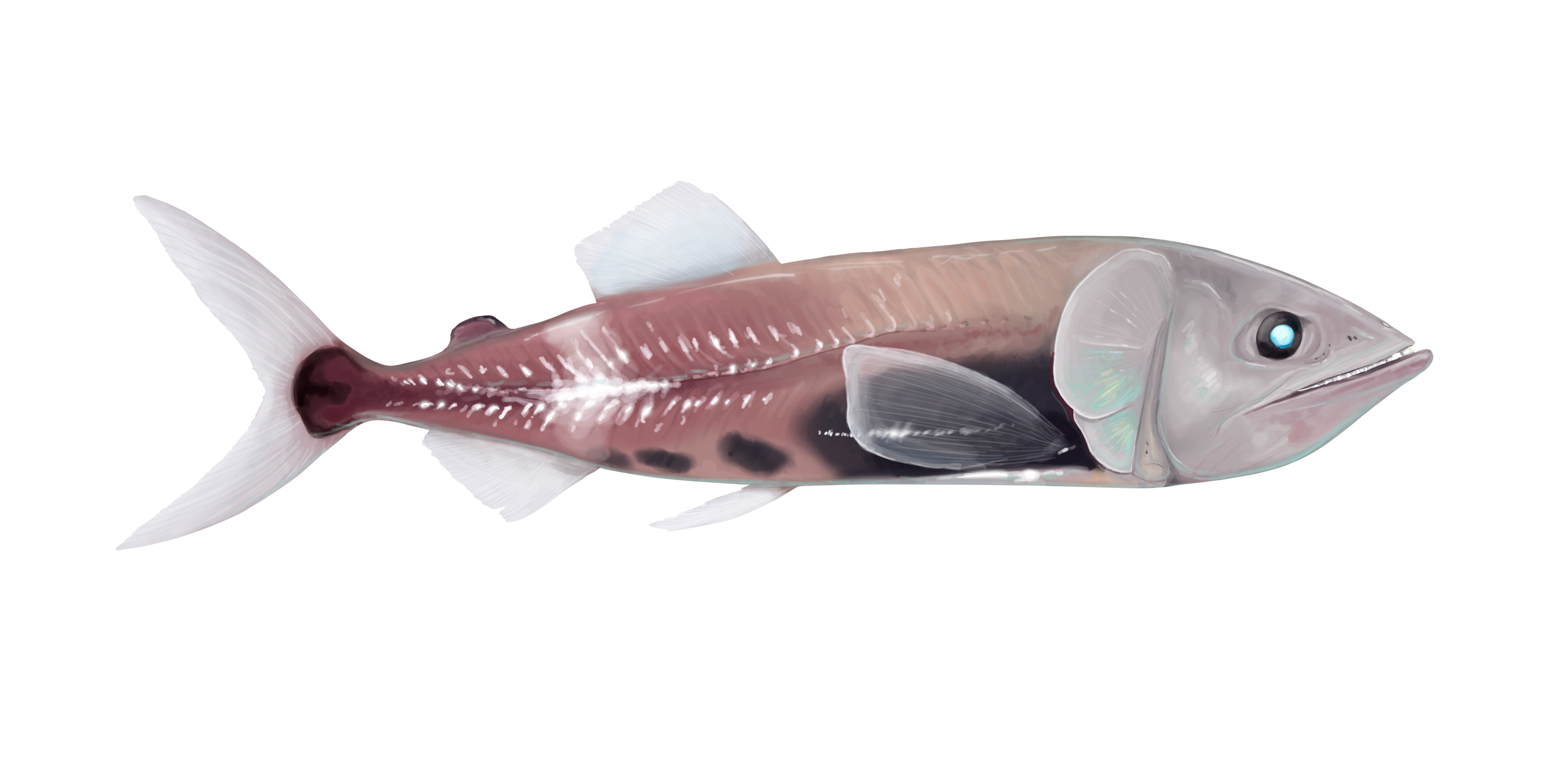
Restoration of E. petrosus

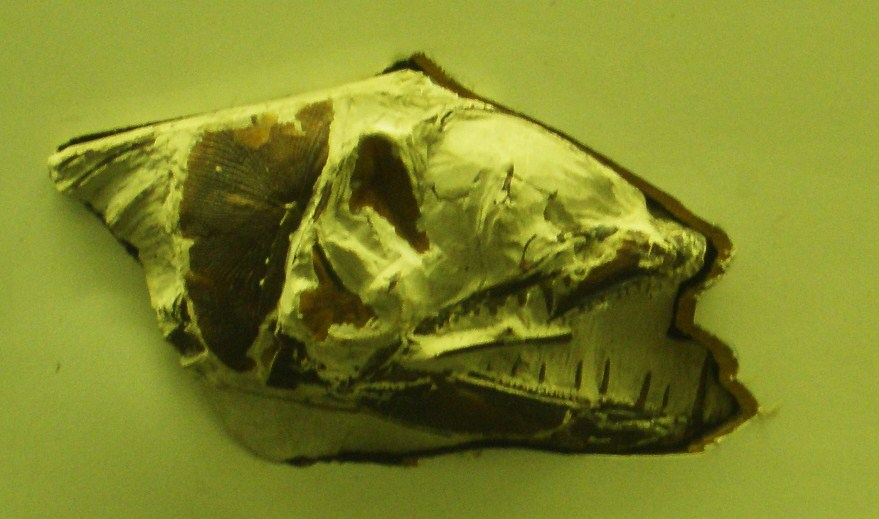
E. lewesiensis skull

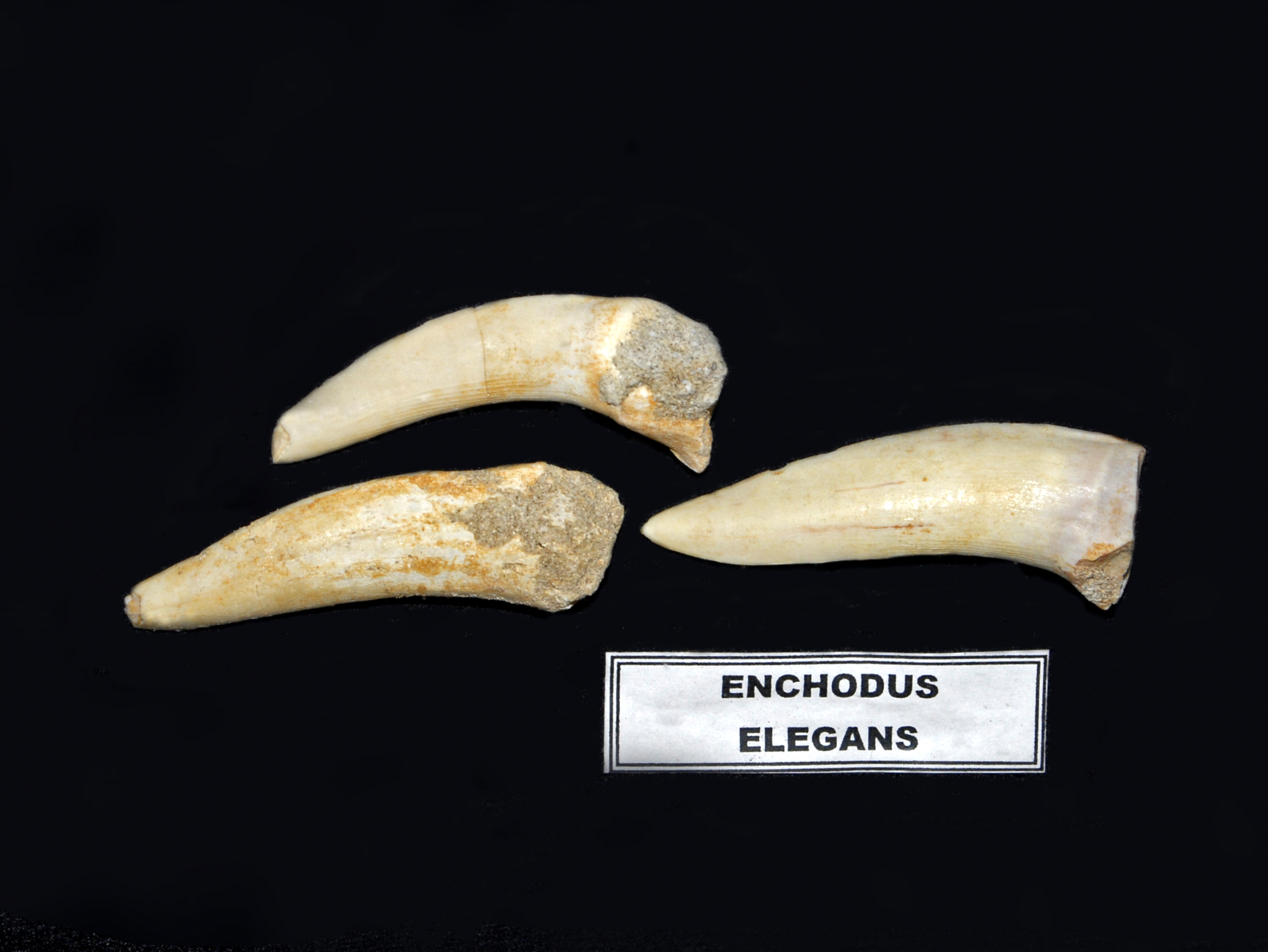
Teeth of E. elegans from Khouribga

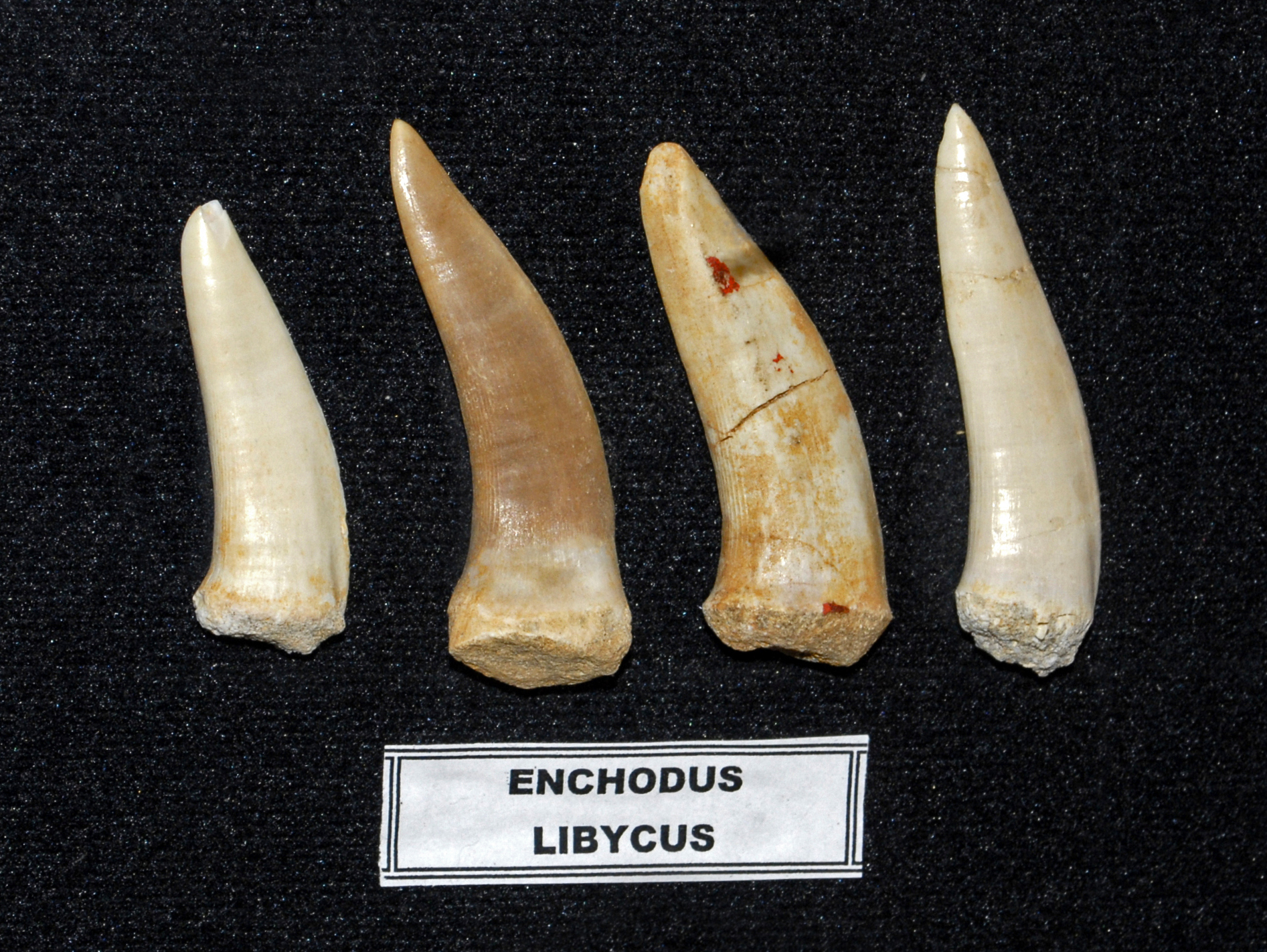
Teeth of E. libycus from Khouribga
