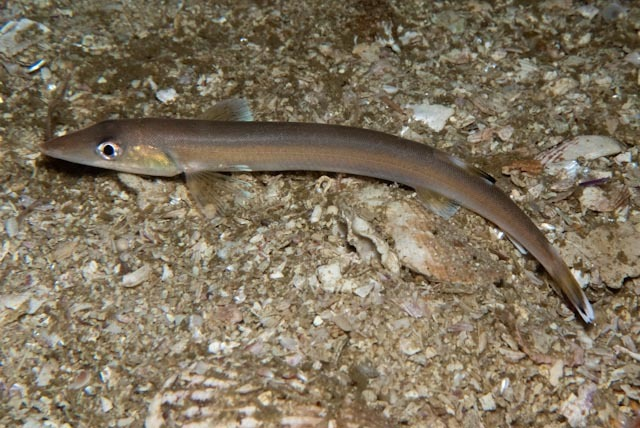

Conservation status
- Least Concern (IUCN 3.1)

Scientific classification
- Kingdom: Animalia
- Phylum: Chordata
- Class: Actinopterygii
- Order: Gonorynchiformes
- Family: Gonorynchidae
- Genus: Gonorynchus
- Species: G. gonorynchus

Binomial name
- Gonorynchus gonorynchus (Linnaeus, 1766)

Synonyms
- Cyprinus gonorynchus Linnaeus, 1766; Cobitis gonorynchus (Linnaeus, 1766); Gonorhynchus gronovii Valenciennes, 1847

= Gonorynchus gonorynchus =

Species of fish

Gonorynchus gonorynchus is a species of fish in the family Gonorynchidae, found on temperate continental shelves worldwide. Common names for this fish include mousefish, ratfish, sandfish, and sand eel.

== Location ==
Gonorynchus gonorynchus inhabits the coasts of the southern third of Africa stretching from Skeleton Coast to Mozambique as well as the coasts of Australia and Japan. Its range also stretches into the Eastern Pacific with specimens found off the coast of Chile. However, this species may be restricted to the south eastern Atlantic Ocean and southwestern Indian Ocean off the coasts of Southern Africa from the Skeleton Coast to the Mozambique Channel.

== Diet and habitat ==
Gonorynchus gonorynchus lives in and above the seabed at depths ranging from 0–200 m. It is generally nocturnal and buries itself in the seabed during daylight hours. It has a varied diet, eating zooplankton and free-swimming and buried invertebrates. The young are preyed upon by seabirds. As well adults of the species are preyed upon by juvenile South African hakes.
