= Aperioptus =

Scientific classification
- Kingdom: Animalia
- Phylum: Chordata
- Class: Actinopterygii
- Division: Teleostei
- Order: Cypriniformes
- Family: Cobitidae
- Genus: Aperioptus; J. Richardson, 1848

Genus of fishes

Aperioptus is a doubtful genus of freshwater fishes which has been classified in the true loach family Cobitidae. This genus was proposed by Sir John Richardson in 1848 when he described Aperioptus pictorius, however, the specimens Richardson used to describe the genus were lost. In 2015 a neotype of Aperioptus pictorius was designated, but this designation was considered invalid, and, it was argued Richardson's description was insufficient to identify the taxon he was describing. Richardson's description may be of some kind of gonorynchid. Later in 2015, it was synonymised with Acanthopsoides molobrion.
