= Tokio Formation =

Geologic formation in Arkansas & Oklahoma

- Stratigraphic range: Cretaceous
- Type: Formation
- Unit of: none
- Sub-units: none
- Underlies: Brownstown Marl
- Overlies: Woodbine Formation
- Thickness: up to 300 feet

Location
- Region: Arkansas, Oklahoma
- Country: United States

Type section
- Named for: Tokio, Hempstead County, Arkansas
- Named by: Hugh Dinsmore Miser and Albert Homer Purdue

The Tokio Formation is a Late Cretaceous geologic formation in Arkansas and Oklahoma. Named in 1919 by Hugh Dinsmore Miser and Albert Homer Purdue in their study of Arkansas. They assigned the town of Tokio, Hempstead County, Arkansas as the type locality, but did not designate a stratotype for this unit.
