= Palaeolycus =

Scientific classification
- Domain: Eukaryota
- Kingdom: Animalia
- Phylum: Chordata
- Class: Actinopterygii
- Order: Alepisauriformes
- Genus: †Palaeolycus von der Marck, 1863

Extinct genus of ray-finned fishes

Palaeolycus (meaning "old wolf") is a genus of prehistoric ray-finned fish.
