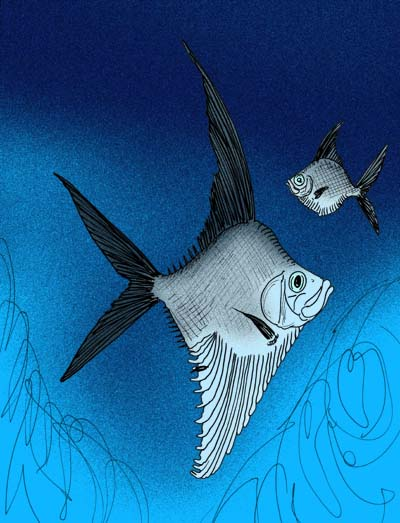
- Artist's reconstruction

Scientific classification
- Kingdom: Animalia
- Phylum: Chordata
- Class: Actinopterygii
- Superorder: Clupeomorpha
- Order: †Ellimmichthyiformes
- Family: †Paraclupeidae
- Subfamily: †Paraclupeinae
- Genus: †Rhombichthys; Khalloufi et al., 2010
- Species: †R. intoccabilis

Binomial name
- †Rhombichthys intoccabilis Khalloufi et al., 2010

= Rhombichthys =

Rhombichthys Temporal range: Cenomanian

Extinct genus of fishes

Rhombichthys intoccabilis is an extinct clupeomorph described from the Amminadav Formation of the West Bank. It lived during the Cenomanian age of the Late Cretaceous epoch.

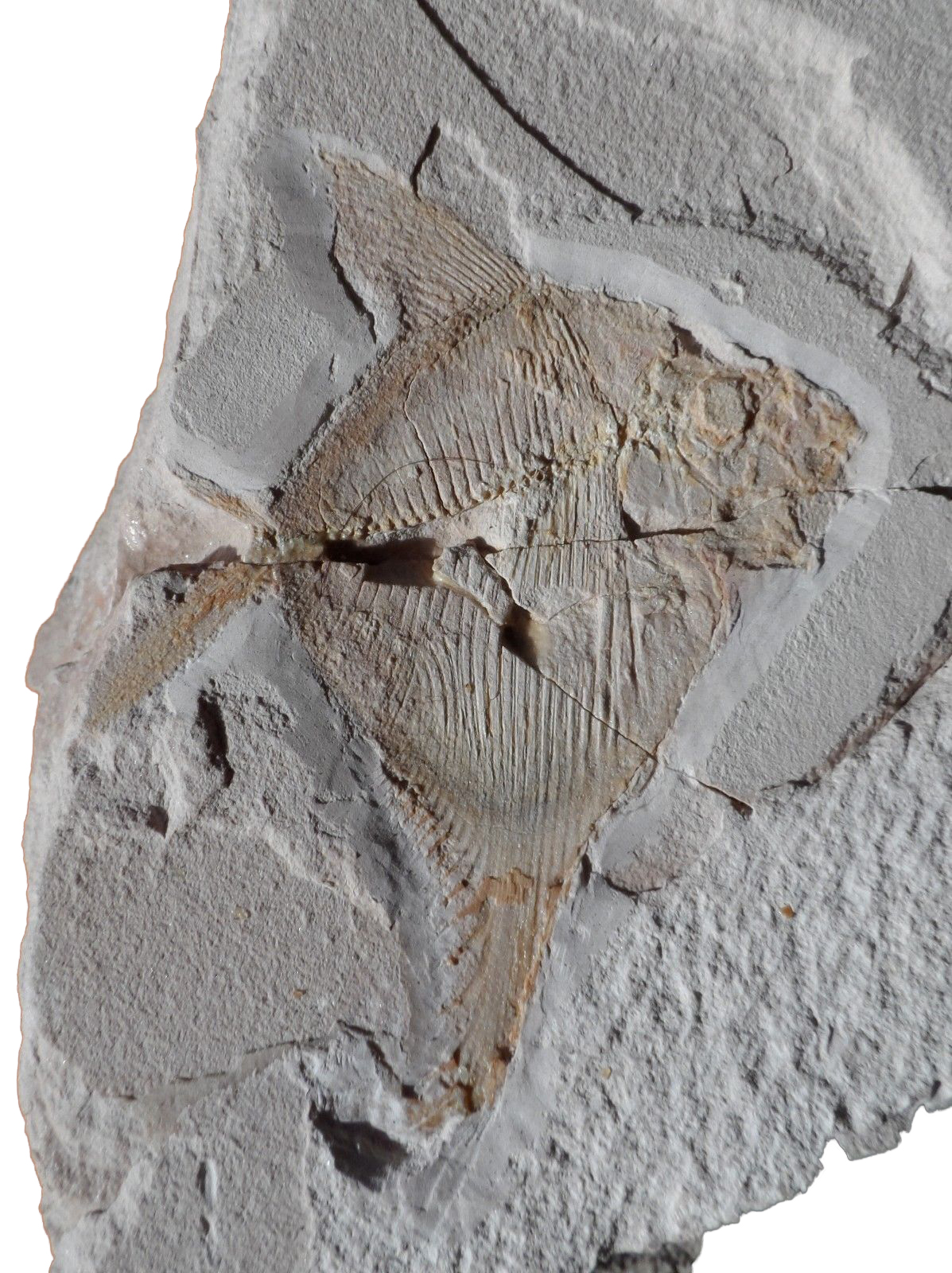
Fossil specimen of an indeterminate Rhombichthys species (possibly R. intoccabilis) from the Akrabou Formation of Morocco

The adults of R. intoccabilis had a very deep, scute-covered belly. In conjunction with the high, triangular dorsal fin, the belly gives the fish a rhombus-shaped body profile, hence the generic name. The juveniles, in contrast, had a far shallower belly, having a rounded profile.
