= Charitosomus =

Charitosomus Temporal range: Late Santonian to Campanian

Scientific classification
- Kingdom: Animalia
- Phylum: Chordata
- Class: Actinopterygii
- Order: Gonorynchiformes
- Family: Gonorynchidae
- Genus: †Charitosomus von der Marck, 1885

Species
- See text

Extinct genus of fishes

Charitosomus is an extinct genus of prehistoric marine ray-finned fish from the Late Cretaceous, related to modern beaked salmons. They were nektonic carnivores in life.

It contains the following species:

- †C. formosus von der Marck 1885 - Late Campanian of Germany (Baumberge Formation)
- †C. lineolatus (Pictet & Humbert 1866) - Santonian of Lebanon (Sahel Alma) (=Solenognathus lineolatus Pictet & Humbert, 1866)
- †C. major Woodward 1901 - Santonian of Lebanon (Sahel Alma)

The species C. hakelensis (Davis, 1887) from the Late Cenomanian of Lebanon is now placed in its own genus, Hakeliosomus. Another species, C. hermani Taverne, 1976, from the late Albian-middle Cenomanian of the Democratic Republic of the Congo, is presently considered an indeterminate gonorynchid.

== See also ==
- Prehistoric fish
- List of prehistoric bony fish
