= Rharbichthys =

Scientific classification
- Domain: Eukaryota
- Kingdom: Animalia
- Phylum: Chordata
- Class: Actinopterygii
- Order: Alepisauriformes
- Genus: †Rharbichthys; Arambourg, 1955

Extinct genus of fishes

Rharbichthys is a genus of prehistoric fishes.
