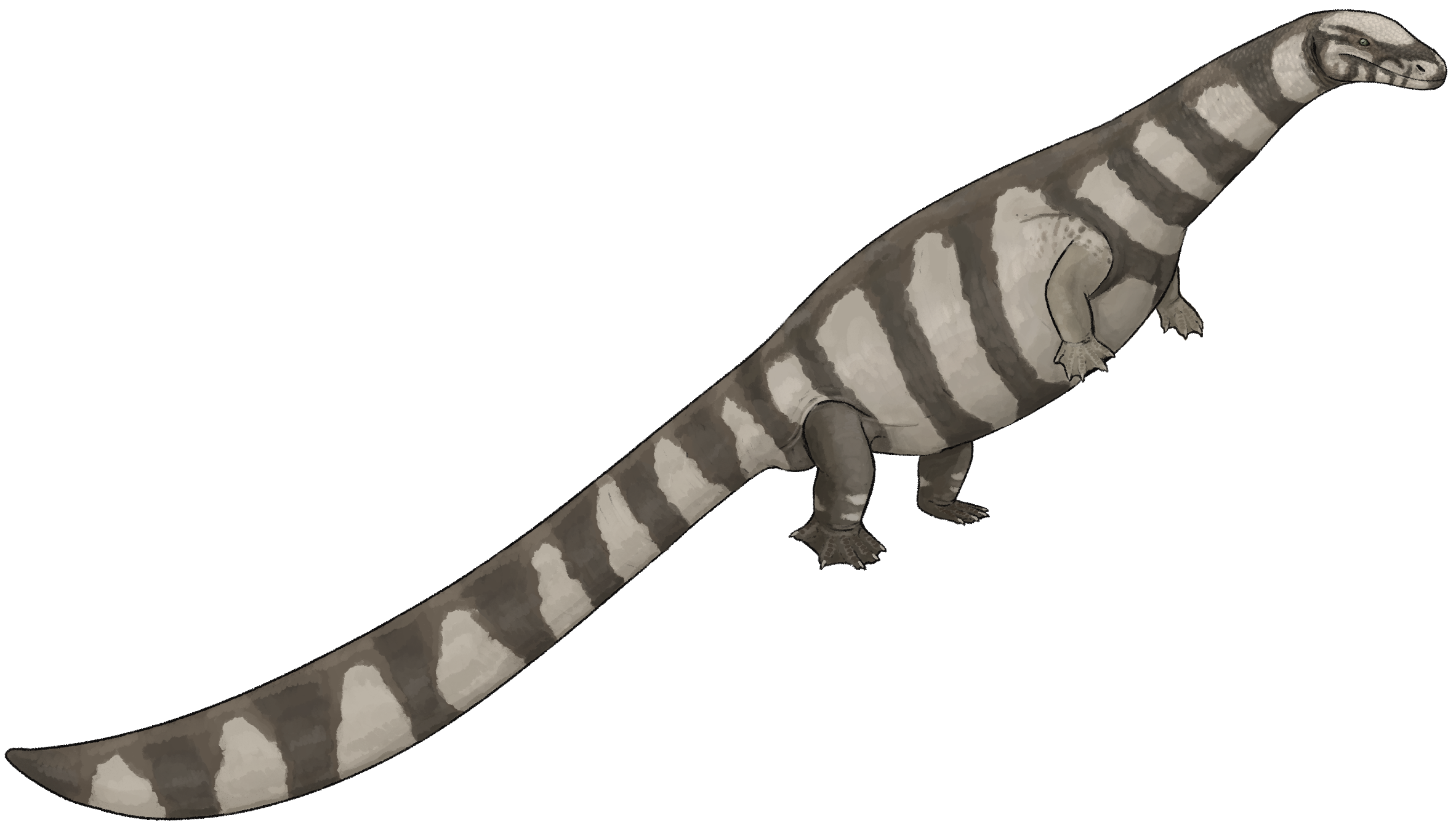
- Life restoration

Scientific classification
- Kingdom: Animalia
- Phylum: Chordata
- Order: Squamata
- Clade: †Mosasauria
- Superfamily: †Mosasauroidea
- Genus: †Mesoleptos; Cornalia, E. & Chiozza, L. 1852

Species
- †M. zendrinii (Cornalia, E. & Chiozza, L. 1852)

= Mesoleptos =

Mesoleptos Temporal range: Late Cretaceous, Cenomanian

Extinct genus of lizards

Mesoleptos was a genus of mosasauroid from the Late Cretaceous period of Europe and the Middle East.

== See also ==
- List of mosasaurs
