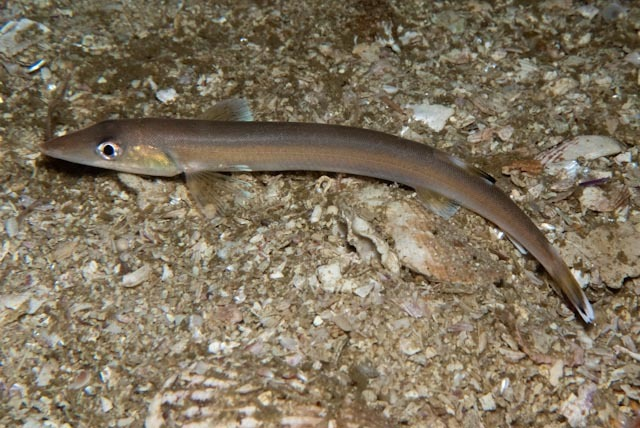
- Gonorynchus gonorynchus

Scientific classification
- Kingdom: Animalia
- Phylum: Chordata
- Class: Actinopterygii
- Order: Gonorynchiformes
- Family: Gonorynchidae; Fowler, 1941

Type genus
- Gonorynchus Scopoli, 1777

Synonyms
- Gonorhynchidae Richardson, 1848 (Note: Gonorynchidae Fowler, 1941 is now the accepted name for the family, based on prevailing usage and the ICZN ruling.; Gonorhynchidae Richardson, 1848 is a junior synonym and no longer valid.)

= Gonorynchidae =

Gonorynchidae Temporal range: Albian–present

Family of fishes

Gonorynchidae is a family of ray-finned fish in the order Gonorynchiformes, which has a number of fossil taxa and one extant genus, Gonorynchus, the beaked salmons. They are an ancient group, with fossils known from as far back as the Albian stage of the Early Cretaceous. The family name comes from Ancient Greek γωνία (gōnía), meaning "angle", and ῥύγχος (rhúnkhos), meaning "snout", referring to the angular snout that the type species use to dig themselves into the sand.

John Richardson is the original author of the family.

== Taxonomy ==
The following genera are known:

- Aperioptus Richardson, 1848 (Incertae sedis)
- †Charitopsis Gayet 1993
- †Charitosomus Hosius & Von Der Marck 1885
- †Gonorynchidarum Rana, 1988 [otolith]
- Gonorynchus Scopoli, 1777 - beaked salmons
- †Hakeliosomus Gayet 1993 (possibly synonymous with Ramallichthys)
- †Judeichthys Gayet 1985 (possibly synonymous with Ramallichthys)
- †Lecceichthys Taverne, 1998
- †Notogoneus Cope 1885 (=†Anormurus Blainville, 1818, †Protocatostomus Whitfield 1891)
- †Sapperichthys Amaral, Alvardo-Ortega & Brito, 2013
- †Ramallichthys Gayet 1982

An indeterminate gonorynchid (previously classified in Charitosomus) is known from fossil remains from the late Albian or early-mid Cenomanian Kwango Group of the Democratic Republic of the Congo.
