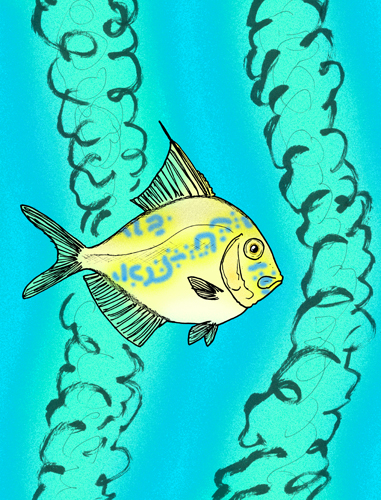
- Reconstruction of P. venenifer

Scientific classification
- Kingdom: Animalia
- Phylum: Chordata
- Class: Actinopterygii
- Division: Teleostei
- Order: Beryciformes
- Family: †Pharmacichthyidae; Patterson, 1964
- Genus: †Pharmacichthys; Woodward, 1942

= Pharmacichthys =

Pharmacichthys Temporal range: Cenomanian

Extinct genus of fishes

Pharmacichthys is a genus of prehistoric, deep-bodied fish that was described by Woodward in 1942. Species of the genus Pharmacichthys are known only from Cenomanian marine strata in Lebanon.
