= Aipichthyoides =

Aipichthyoides Temporal range: Lower Cenomanian

Scientific classification
- Kingdom: Animalia
- Phylum: Chordata
- Class: Actinopterygii
- Family: †Aipichthyoididae
- Genus: †Aipichthyoides; Gayet, 1980
- Species: †A. galeatus

Binomial name
- †Aipichthyoides galeatus Gayet, 1980

Extinct genus of fishes

Aipichthyoides is an extinct genus of prehistoric marine bony fish that lived during the lower Cenomanian in what is now the West Bank. Formerly classified in the Polymixiiformes, it is now thought to be a distant relative of oarfish and opahs.

== See also ==
- Prehistoric fish
- List of prehistoric bony fish
