= Saurorhamphus =

Saurorhamphus Temporal range: Cenomanian

Scientific classification
- Domain: Eukaryota
- Kingdom: Animalia
- Phylum: Chordata
- Class: Actinopterygii
- Order: Aulopiformes
- Family: †Eurypholidae
- Genus: †Saurorhamphus; Heckel, 1850

Species
- S. freyeri Heckel, 1850; S. judeaensis Chalifa 1985; S. giorgiae Bannikov and Bacchia 2005

Extinct genus of ray-finned fishes

Saurorhamphus (meaning "lizard with a crooked beak") is an extinct genus of aulopiform ray-finned fish. Fossils are known from the Late Cretaceous (Cenomanian) of the former Tethyan region (Slovenia, West Bank, Lebanon), but an undescribed specimen is also known from Mexico.
