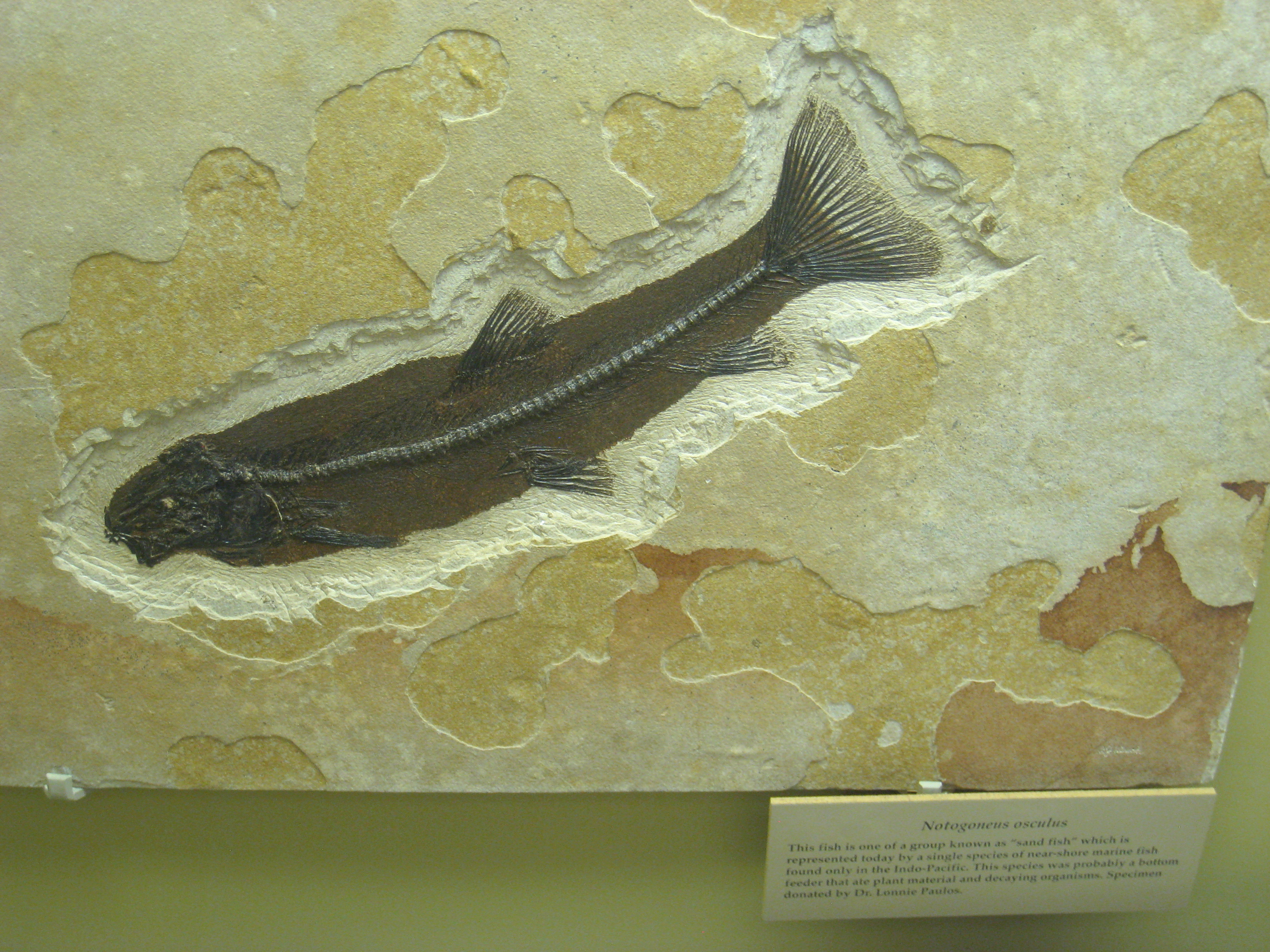
- Notogoneus osculus

Scientific classification
- Kingdom: Animalia
- Phylum: Chordata
- Class: Actinopterygii
- Order: Gonorynchiformes
- Family: Gonorynchidae
- Genus: †Notogoneus; Cope, 1885

Type species
- Notogoneus osculus Cope, 1885

Species
- see text

= Notogoneus =

Notogoneus Temporal range: Late Santonian to Wasatchian

Extinct genus of fishes

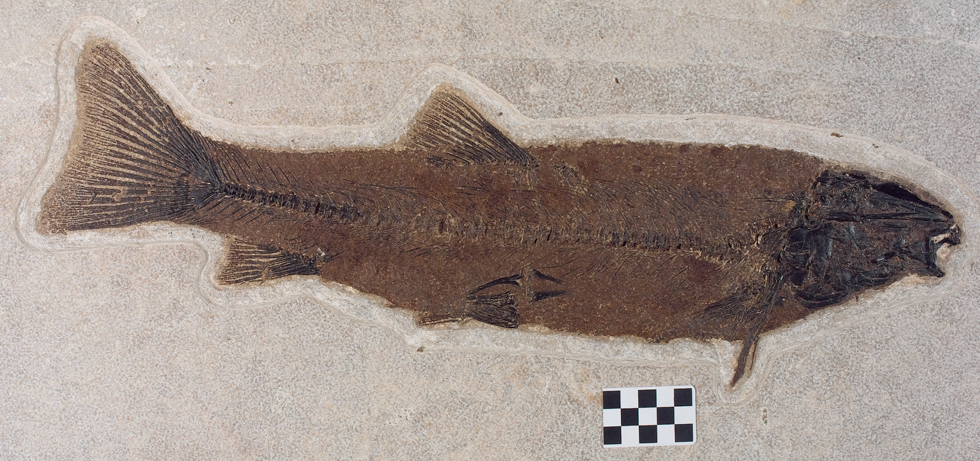
Adult Notogoneus osculus from Fossil Butte National Monument. Specimen is 52 cm long.

Notogoneus is an extinct genus of prehistoric ray-finned fish. A trace fossil attributed to Notogoneus osculus has been found in the Green River Formation.

== Species ==
- †Notogoneus cuvieri (Agassiz, 1844)
- †Notogoneus gracilis Sytchevskaya, 1986
- †Notogoneus janeti Priem, 1908
- †Notogoneus longiceps von Meyer, 1848
- †Notogoneus maarvelis Grande, 2022
- †Notogoneus montanensis Grande and Grande, 1999
- †Notogoneus osculus Cope, 1885
- †Notogoneus parvus Hills, 1934
- †Notogoneus squamosseus Blainville, 1818

== See also ==
- Prehistoric fish
- List of prehistoric bony fish
