= Ramallichthys =

Ramallichthys Temporal range: Lower Cenomanian

Scientific classification
- Kingdom: Animalia
- Phylum: Chordata
- Class: Actinopterygii
- Order: Gonorynchiformes
- Family: Gonorynchidae
- Genus: †Ramallichthys; Gayet, 1982

Type species
- †Ramallichthys orientalis Gayet, 1982

Extinct genus of fishes

Ramallichthys is an extinct genus of prehistoric bony fish that lived during the lower Cenomanian.

== See also ==
- Prehistoric fish
- List of prehistoric bony fish
