= Parenchodus =

Parenchodus Temporal range: Cenomanian

Scientific classification
- Kingdom: Animalia
- Phylum: Chordata
- Class: Actinopterygii
- Order: Alepisauriformes
- Genus: †Parenchodus; Raab & Chalifa, 1987

Extinct genus of ray-finned fishes

Parenchodus is a genus of prehistoric ray-finned fish from the Late Cenomanian. The fossils are known from Givat Shaul, Israel, while some reports it from the Ein Yabrud, Palestine, and there are eight total specimens. It is home to one species P. longipterygius.

== Description ==
The genus is characterized by a short, high body, a fenestra-less premaxilla, and by the long and narrow postcleithrum reaching the ventral margin of the belly. Other characteristics are the axial skeleton with thirty vertebrae, of which only seven are abdominal; dorsal and anal fins with long bases; a ventral, well-developed pectoral fin; a naked body, devoid of scales except for two dorsal postoccipital and three lateral scutes at the base of the tail; and with a reduction and fusion of the endoskeletal elements of the caudal fin.
