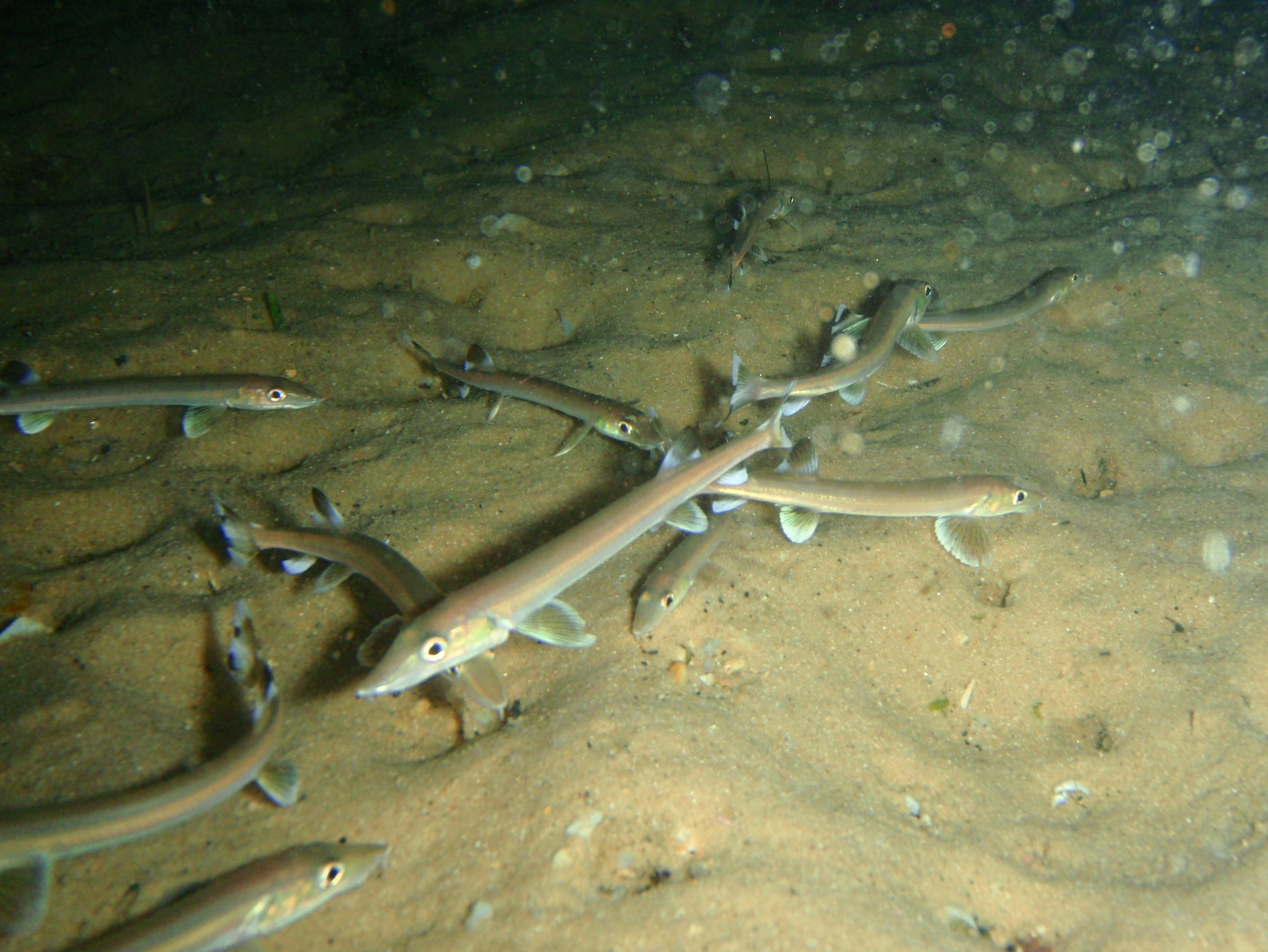
- Gonorynchus gonorynchus

Scientific classification
- Kingdom: Animalia
- Phylum: Chordata
- Class: Actinopterygii
- Order: Gonorynchiformes
- Family: Gonorynchidae
- Genus: Gonorynchus; Scopoli ex Gronow, 1777

Type species
- Cyprinus gonorynchus Linnaeus, 1766

= Gonorynchus =

Beaked salmon

Genus of fishes

Gonorynchus is a genus of long thin gonorynchiform ray-finned fish, commonly called beaked salmon or beaked sandfish. They live on sandy bottoms near shorelines of the temperate & subtropical Southern Hemisphere and East Asia. There are five known extant species which are placed in this genus. The genus name comes from Ancient Greek γωνία (gōnía), meaning "angle", and ῥύγχος (rhúnkhos), meaning "snout", referring to the distinctive angular snout that the fish use to dig themselves into the sand. A swim bladder is absent.

They are the last surviving members of the ancient family Gonorynchidae, which was much more diverse in the past. Unlike other gonorynchids, there have been no known fossil remains of Gonorynchus identified, although they are assumed to have diverged from their closest relative (the extinct Notogoneus) during the Albian stage of the Early Cretaceous.

The most widespread species is Gonorynchus gonorynchus, found in scattered locations worldwide. It can reach up to 60 cm (24 in) in length. It is a nocturnal fish, feeding on invertebrates at night and burrowing into sand or mud during the day.

Beaked salmon are fished commercially in some areas. The flesh of Gonorynchus greyi, found around Australia and New Zealand, is reported to be "firm and of good flavour".

== Species ==
- Gonorynchus abbreviatus Temminck & Schlegel, 1846
- Gonorynchus forsteri J. D. Ogilby, 1911
- Gonorynchus gonorynchus (Linnaeus, 1766)
- Gonorynchus greyi (J. Richardson, 1845)
- Gonorynchus moseleyi D. S. Jordan & Snyder, 1923
