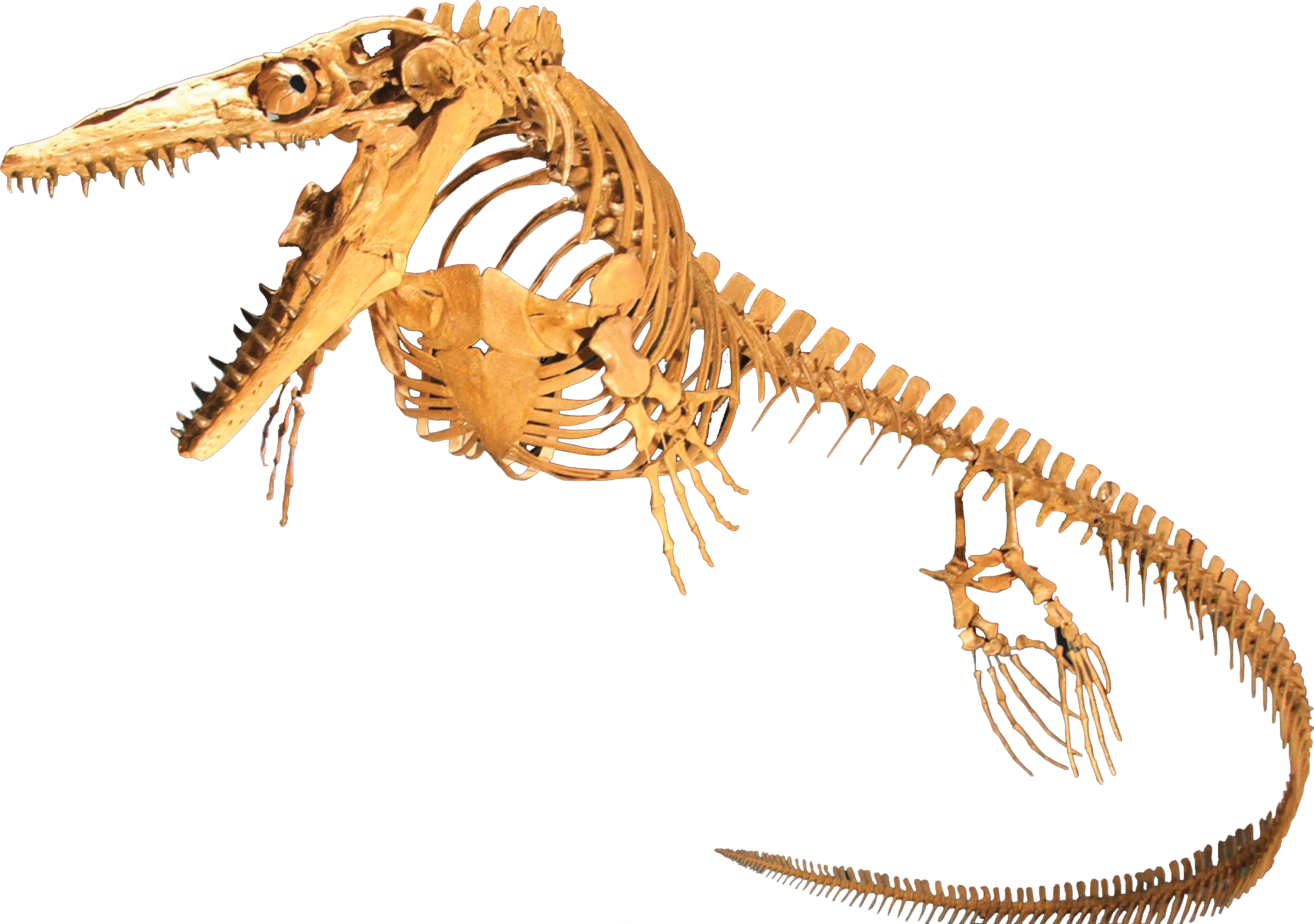
- Mounted skeleton of a russellosaurine (Plesioplatecarpus planifrons)

Scientific classification
- Kingdom: Animalia
- Phylum: Chordata
- Class: Reptilia
- Order: Squamata
- Clade: †Mosasauria
- Superfamily: †Mosasauroidea
- Family: †Mosasauridae; Gervais, 1853

Subgroups
- †Halisaurinae; †Mosasaurinae; †Russellosaurina; †Plioplatecarpinae; †Tethysaurinae; †Tylosaurinae; †Yaguarasaurinae

= Mosasaur =

Mosasaurs Temporal range: Late Cretaceous, 94–66 Ma

Extinct marine lizards of the Late Cretaceous

Mosasaurs (from Latin Mosa meaning the 'Meuse', and Greek σαύρος sauros meaning 'lizard') are an extinct group of large aquatic reptiles within the family Mosasauridae that lived during the Late Cretaceous. Their first fossil remains were discovered in a limestone quarry at Maastricht on the Meuse in 1764. They belong to the order Squamata, which includes lizards and snakes.

During the last 20 million years of the Cretaceous period (Turonian–Maastrichtian ages), with the extinction of the ichthyosaurs and pliosaurs, mosasaurids became the dominant marine predators. They themselves became extinct as a result of the K-Pg event at the end of the Cretaceous period, about 66 million years ago.

== Description ==
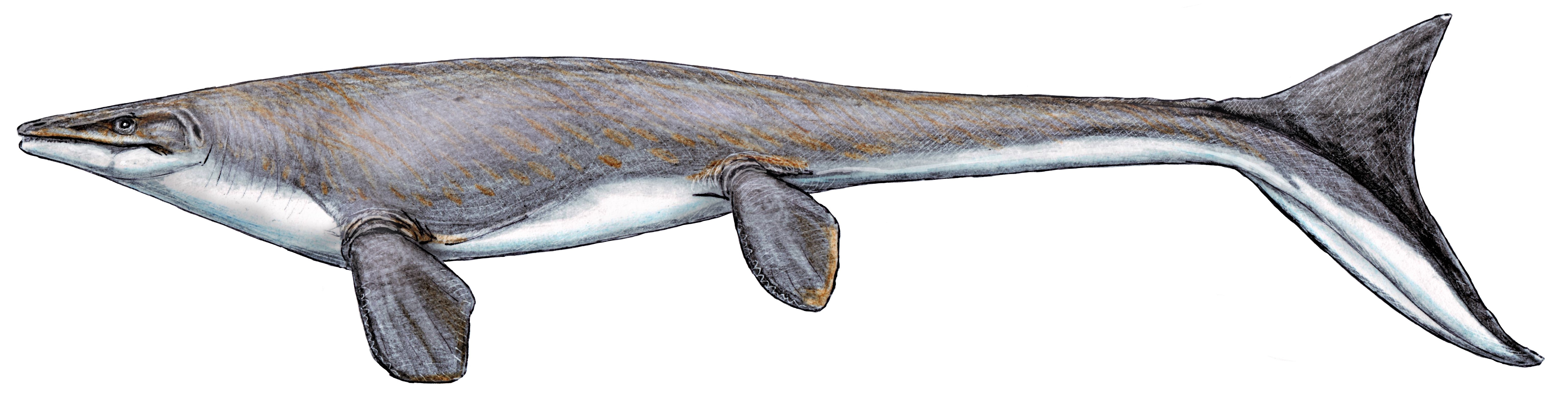
Life restoration of a mosasaur (Platecarpus tympaniticus) informed by fossil skin impressions

Mosasaurs breathed air, were powerful swimmers, and were well-adapted to living in the warm, shallow inland seas prevalent during the Late Cretaceous period. Mosasaurs were so well adapted to this environment that they most likely gave birth to live young, rather than returning to the shore to lay eggs as sea turtles do.

The smallest-known mosasaur was Dallasaurus turneri, which was less than 1 m (3.3 ft) long. Larger mosasaurs were more typical, with many species growing longer than 4 m (13 ft). Mosasaurus hoffmannii, the largest known species reached up to 17 m (56 ft), but it has been considered to be probably overestimated by Cleary et al. (2018).

Mosasaurs had a body shape similar to that of modern-day monitor lizards (varanids), but were more elongated and streamlined for swimming. Their limb bones were reduced in length and their paddles were formed by webbing between their long finger and toe bones. Their tails were broad and laterally compressed, terminating in a fluke-like structure that served as the primary source of propulsion.

Until recently, mosasaurs were assumed to have swum in a method similar to the one used today by conger eels and sea snakes, undulating their entire bodies from side to side. However, new evidence suggests that many advanced mosasaurs had large, crescent-shaped flukes on the ends of their tails, similar to those of sharks and some ichthyosaurs. Rather than use snake-like undulations, their bodies probably remained stiff to reduce drag through the water, while their tails provided strong propulsion. These animals may have lurked and pounced rapidly and powerfully on passing prey, rather than chasing after it. At least some species were also capable of aquaflight, flapping their flippers like sea lions.

Early reconstructions showed mosasaurs with dorsal crests running the length of their bodies, which were based on misidentified remains of tracheal cartilage. By the time this error was discovered, depicting mosasaurs with such crests in artwork had already become a trend.

== Paleobiology ==
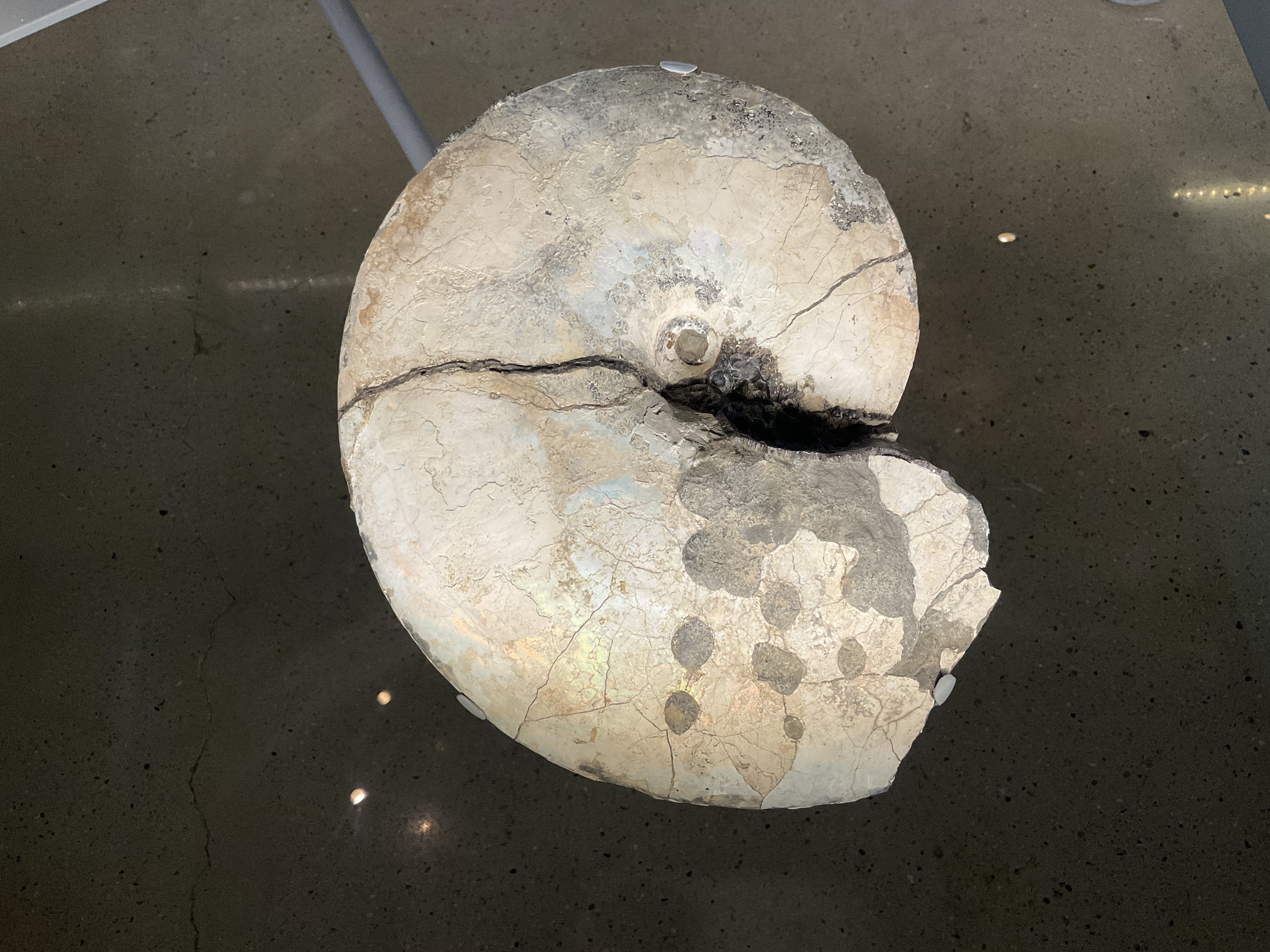
The ammonite Placenticeras showing punctures caused by the bite of a mosasaur, Natural History Museum of Los Angeles County

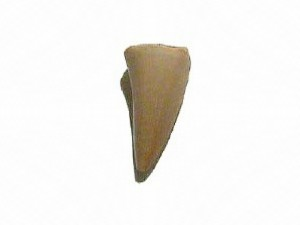
A tooth from a mosasaur

Mosasaurs had double-hinged jaws and flexible skulls (much like those of snakes), which enabled them to gulp down their prey almost whole. A skeleton of Tylosaurus proriger from South Dakota included remains of the flightless diving seabird Hesperornis, a marine bony fish, a possible shark, and another, smaller mosasaur (Clidastes). Mosasaur bones have also been found with shark teeth embedded in them.

One of the food items of mosasaurs were ammonites, molluscs with shells similar to those of Nautilus, which were abundant in the Cretaceous seas. Holes have been found in fossil shells of some ammonites, mainly Pachydiscus and Placenticeras. These were once interpreted as a result of limpets attaching themselves to the ammonites, but the triangular shape of the holes, their size, and their presence on both sides of the shells, corresponding to upper and lower jaws, is evidence of the bite of medium-sized mosasaurs. Whether this behaviour was common across all size classes of mosasaurs is not clear.

Virtually all forms were active predators of fish and ammonites; a few, such as Globidens, had blunt, spherical teeth, specialized for crushing mollusk shells. The smaller genera, such as Platecarpus and Dallasaurus, which were about 1–6 m (3–20 ft) long, probably fed on fish and other small prey. The smaller mosasaurs may have spent some time in fresh water, hunting for food. Mosasaurus hoffmannii was the apex predator of the Late Cretaceous oceans, reaching 11 metres (36 ft) in length and 3.8 metric tons (4.2 short tons) in body mass.

=== Soft tissue ===
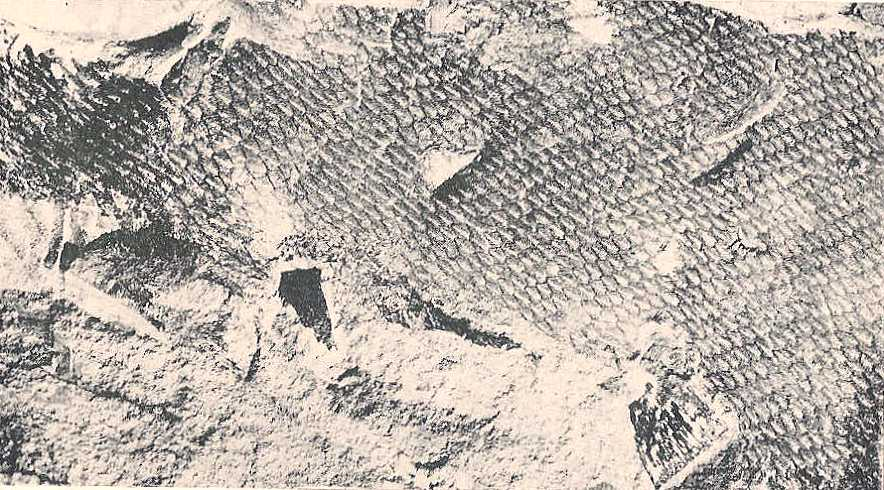
Scales of Tylosaurus proriger (KUVP-1075)

Despite the many mosasaur remains collected worldwide, knowledge of the nature of their skin coverings remains very limited with few mosasaurid specimens retaining fossilized scale imprints. This may be due to the delicate nature of the scales, which nearly eliminates the possibility of preservation. Additionally, sediment types and the marine conditions under which the preservation occurred play key roles in preserving scale imprints. Until the discovery of several mosasaur specimens with remarkably well-preserved scale imprints from late Maastrichtian deposits of the Muwaqqar Chalk Marl Formation of Harrana in Jordan, knowledge of the nature of mosasaur integument was mainly based on very few accounts describing early mosasaur fossils dating back to the upper Santonian–lower Campanian, such as the famous Tylosaurus specimen (KUVP-1075) from Gove County, Kansas.

Material from Jordan has shown that the bodies of mosasaurs, as well as the membranes between their fingers and toes, were covered with small, overlapping, diamond-shaped scales resembling those of snakes. Much like those of modern reptiles, mosasaur scales varied across the body in type and size. In Harrana specimens, two types of scales were observed on a single specimen: keeled scales covering the upper regions of the body and smooth scales covering the lower. As ambush predators, lurking and quickly capturing prey using stealth tactics, they may have benefited from the nonreflective, keeled scales. Additionally, mosasaurs had large pectoral girdles, and such genera as Plotosaurus may have used their front flippers in a breaststroke motion to gain added bursts of speed during an attack on prey. Recent 2024 research, however, used a model to calculate Mosasaurus hoffmanni's acceleration capabilities. They concluded that ambush predation may not be the only hunting strategy for Mosasaurus hoffmanni.

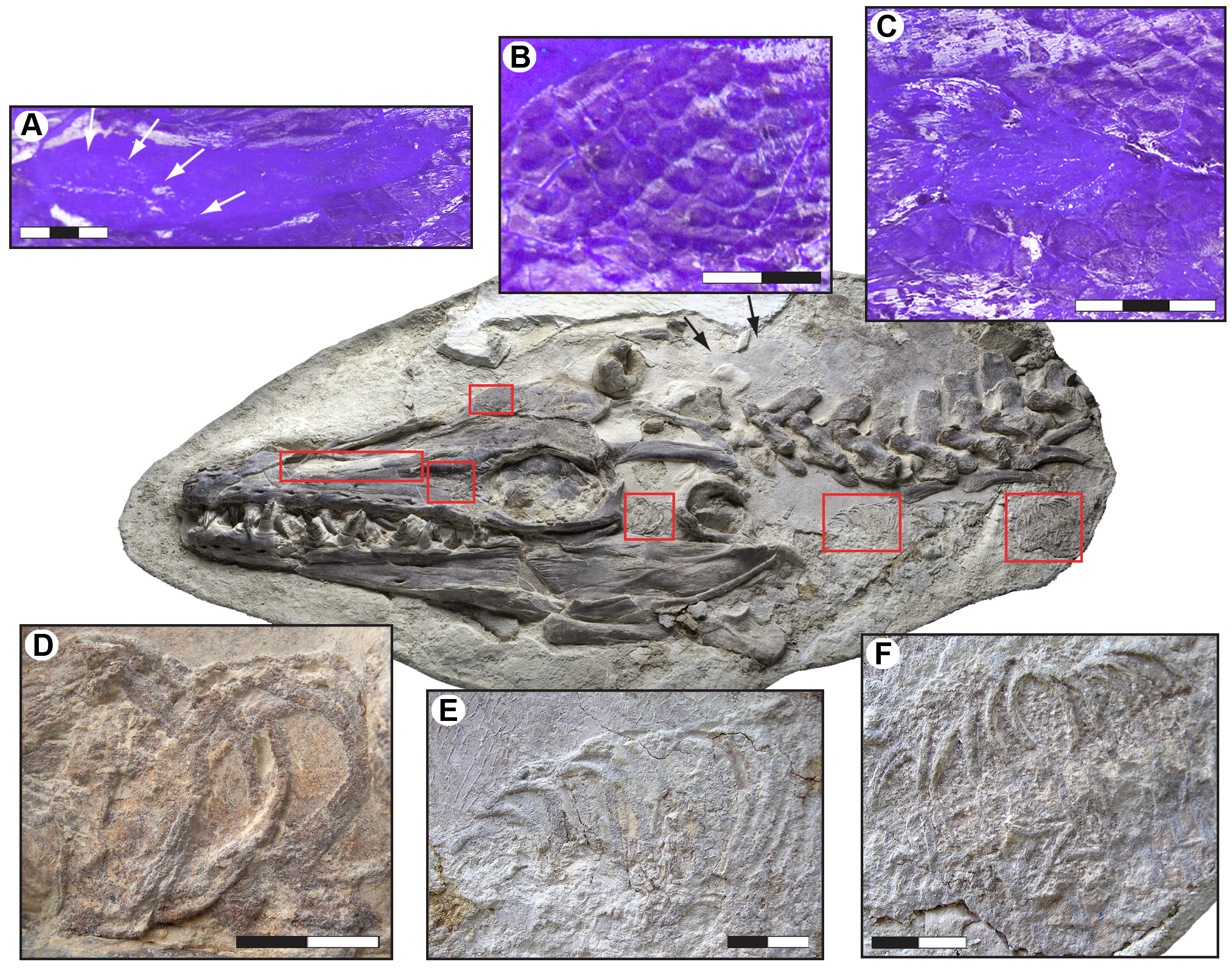
Soft tissues in the head and neck of Platecarpus tympaniticus specimen LACM 128319: Tracheal rings are shown in the bottom three photographs.

More recently, a fossil of Platecarpus tympaniticus has been found that preserved not only skin impressions, but also internal organs. Several reddish areas in the fossil may represent the heart, lungs, and kidneys. The trachea is also preserved, along with part of what may be the retina in the eye. The placement of the kidneys is farther forward in the abdomen than it is in monitor lizards, and is more similar to those of cetaceans. As in cetaceans, the bronchi leading to the lungs run parallel to each other instead of splitting apart from one another as in monitors and other terrestrial reptiles. In mosasaurs, these features may be internal adaptations to fully marine lifestyles.

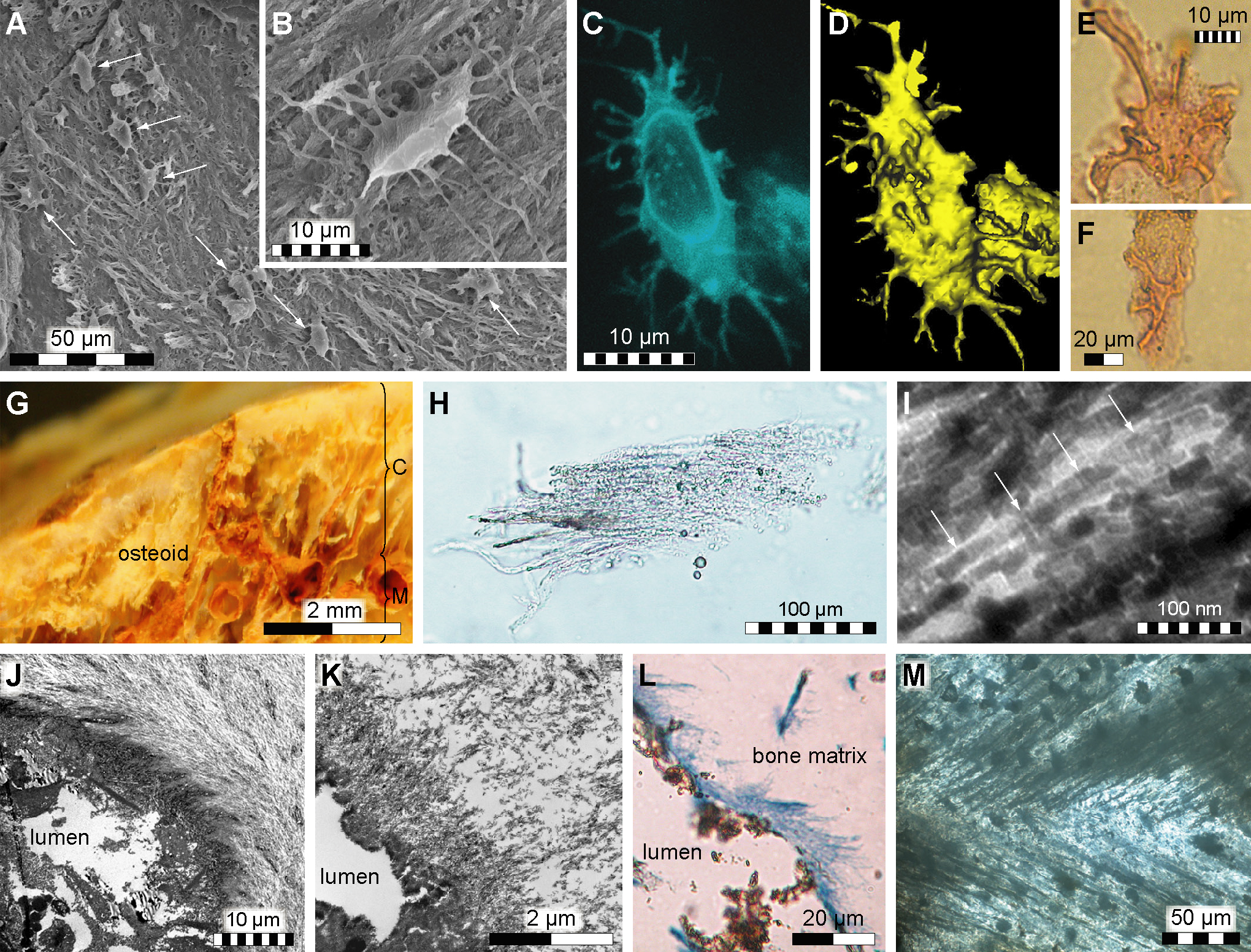
Fibrous tissues and microstructures recovered from Prognathodon specimen IRSNB 1624

In 2011, collagen protein was recovered from a Prognathodon humerus dated to the Cretaceous.

In 2005, a case study by A. S. Schulp, E. W. A Mulder, and K. Schwenk outlined the fact that mosasaurs had paired fenestrae in their palates. In monitor lizards and snakes, paired fenestrae are associated with a forked tongue, which is flicked in and out to detect chemical traces and provide a directional sense of smell. They therefore proposed that mosasaurs probably also had a sensitive forked tongue.

=== Metabolism ===
A study published in 2016 by T. Lyn Harrell, Alberto Pérez-Huerta and Celina Suarez showed that mosasaurs were endothermic. The study contradicted findings published in 2010 indicating mosasaurs were ectothermic. The 2010 study did not use warm-blooded animals for comparison but analogous groups of common marine animals. Based on comparisons with modern warm-blooded animals and fossils of known cold-blooded animals from the same time period, the 2016 study found mosasaurs likely had body temperatures similar to those of contemporary seabirds and were able to internally regulate their temperatures to remain warmer than the surrounding water.

=== Coloration ===
The coloration of mosasaurs was unknown until 2014, when the findings of Johan Lindgren of Lund University and colleagues revealed the pigment melanin in the fossilized scales of a mosasaur Tylosaurus nepaeolicus. Mosasaurs were likely countershaded, with dark backs and light underbellies, much like a great white shark or leatherback sea turtle, the latter of which had fossilized ancestors for which color was also determined. The findings were described in Nature.

=== Teeth ===
Mosasaurs possessed a thecodont dentiton, meaning that the roots were cemented deeply into the jaw bone. Mosasaurs did not use permanent teeth but instead constantly shed them. Replacement teeth developed within a pit inside the roots of the original tooth called the resorption pit. This is done through a distinctively unique eight-stage process. The first stage was characterized by the mineralization of a small tooth crown developed elsewhere that descended into the resorption pit by the second stage. In the third stage, the developing crown firmly cemented itself within the resorption pit and grew in size; by the fourth stage, it would be of the same size as the crown in the original tooth. Stages five and six were characterized by the development of the replacement tooth's root: in stage five the root developed vertically, and in stage six the root expanded in all directions to the point that the replacement tooth became exposed and actively pushed on the original tooth. In the seventh stage, the original tooth was shed and the now-independent replacement tooth began to anchor itself into the vacancy. In the eighth and final stage, the replacement tooth has grown to firmly anchor itself.

=== Ontogeny and growth ===
Mosasaur growth is not well understood, as specimens of juveniles are rare, and many were mistaken for hesperornithine birds when discovered 100 years ago. However, the discovery of several specimens of juvenile and neonate-sized mosasaurs unearthed more than a century ago indicate that mosasaurs gave birth to live young, and that they spent their early years of life out in the open ocean, not in sheltered nurseries or areas such as shallow water as previously believed. Whether mosasaurs provided parental care, like other marine reptiles such as plesiosaurs, is currently unknown.

=== Possible eggs ===
A 2020 study published in Nature described a large fossilized hatched egg from Antarctica from the very end of the Cretaceous, about 68 million years ago. The egg is considered one of the largest amniote eggs ever known, rivalling that of the elephant bird, and due to its soft, thin, folded texture, it likely belonged to a marine animal. While the organism that produced it remains unknown, the egg's pore structure is very similar to that of extant lepidosaurs such as lizards and snakes, and presence of mosasaur fossils nearby indicates that it may have been a mosasaur egg. It is unknown whether the egg was laid on land or in the water. The egg was assigned to the newly described oospecies Antarcticoolithus bradyi. However, it has been proposed that this egg belonged to a dinosaur.

== Environment ==
Paleontologists compared the taxonomic diversity and patterns of morphological disparity in mosasaurs with sea level, sea surface temperature, and stable carbon isotope curves for the Upper Cretaceous to explore factors that may have influenced their evolution. No single factor unambiguously accounts for all radiations, diversification, and extinctions; however, the broader patterns of taxonomic diversification and morphological disparity point to niche differentiation in a "fishing up" scenario under the influence of "bottom-up" selective pressures. The most likely driving force in mosasaur evolution was high productivity in the Late Cretaceous, driven by tectonically controlled sea levels and climatically controlled ocean stratification and nutrient delivery. When productivity collapsed at the end of the Cretaceous, coincident with bolide impact, mosasaurs became extinct.

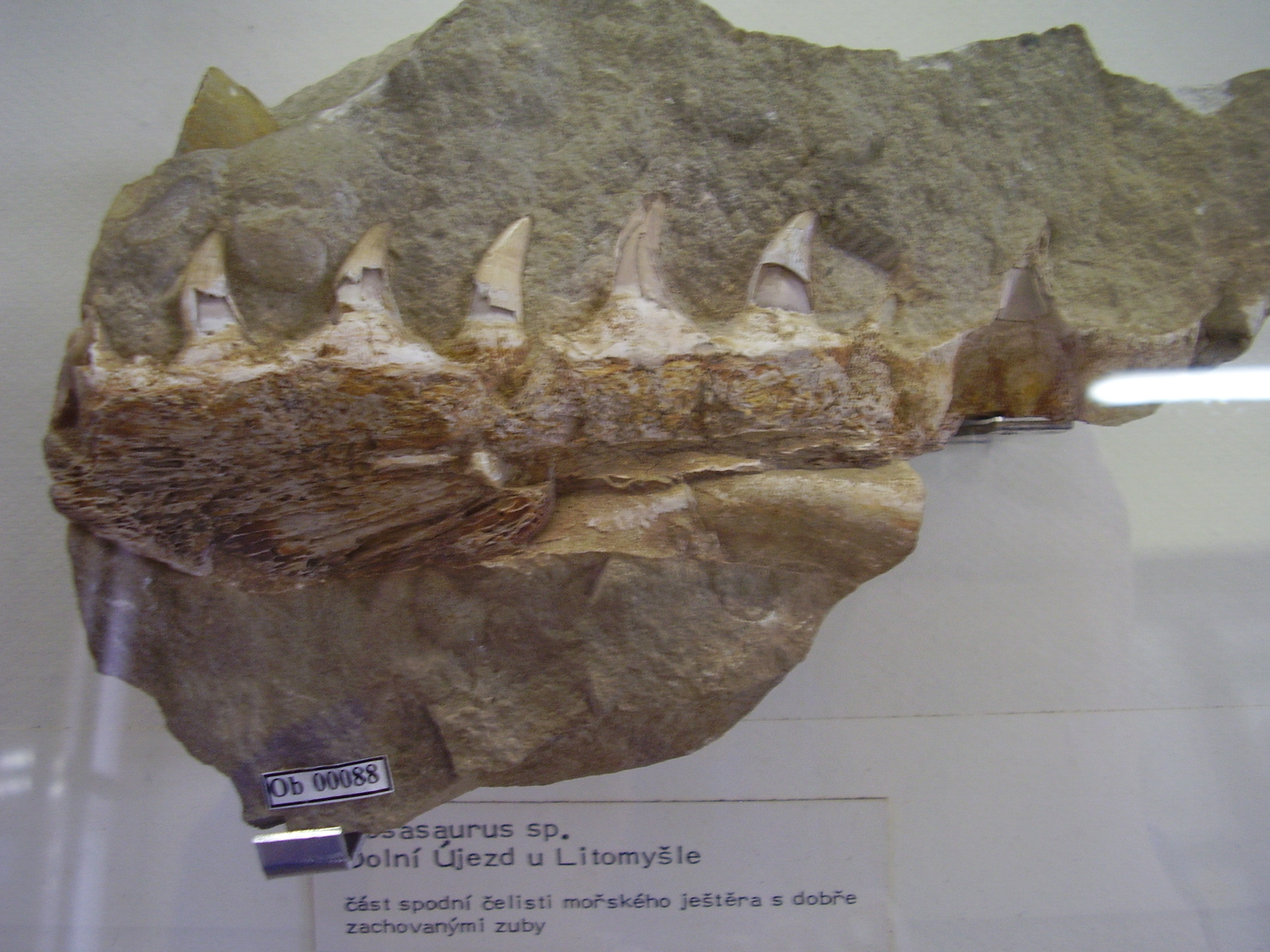
Fossil jaw fragment of a mosasaurid reptile from Dolní Újezd by Litomyšl, Czech Republic

Sea levels were high during the Cretaceous period, causing marine transgressions in many parts of the world, and a great inland seaway in what is now North America. Mosasaur fossils have been found in the Netherlands, Belgium, Denmark, Portugal, Sweden, South Africa, Spain, France, Germany, Poland, the Czech Republic, Italy Bulgaria, the United Kingdom, Russia, Ukraine, Kazakhstan, Azerbaijan, Japan, Egypt, Israel, Jordan, Syria, Turkey, Niger, Angola, Morocco, Australia, New Zealand, and on Vega Island off the coast of Antarctica. Tooth taxon Globidens timorensis is known from the island of Timor; however, the phylogenetic placement of this species is uncertain and it might not even be a mosasaur.

Mosasaurs have been found in Canada in Manitoba and Saskatchewan and in much of the contiguous United States. Complete or partial specimens have been found in Alabama, Mississippi, New Jersey, Tennessee, and Georgia, as well as in states covered by the Cretaceous seaway: Texas, southwest Arkansas, New Mexico, Kansas, Colorado, Nebraska, South Dakota, Montana, Wyoming, and the Pierre Shale/Fox Hills formations of North Dakota. Lastly, mosasaur bones and teeth are also known from Colombia, Brazil, and Chile.

Many of the so-called 'dinosaur' remains found on New Zealand are actually mosasaurs and plesiosaurs, both being Mesozoic predatory marine reptiles.

The largest mosasaur currently on public display is Bruce, a 65–70%-complete specimen of Tylosaurus pembinensis dating from the late Cretaceous Period, approximately 80 million years ago, and measuring 13.05 m (42 ft 9.75 in) from nose tip to tail tip. Bruce was discovered in 1974 north of Thornhill, Manitoba, Canada, and resides at the nearby Canadian Fossil Discovery Centre in Morden, Manitoba. Bruce was awarded the Guinness Record for the largest mosasaur on public display in 2014.

== Discovery ==
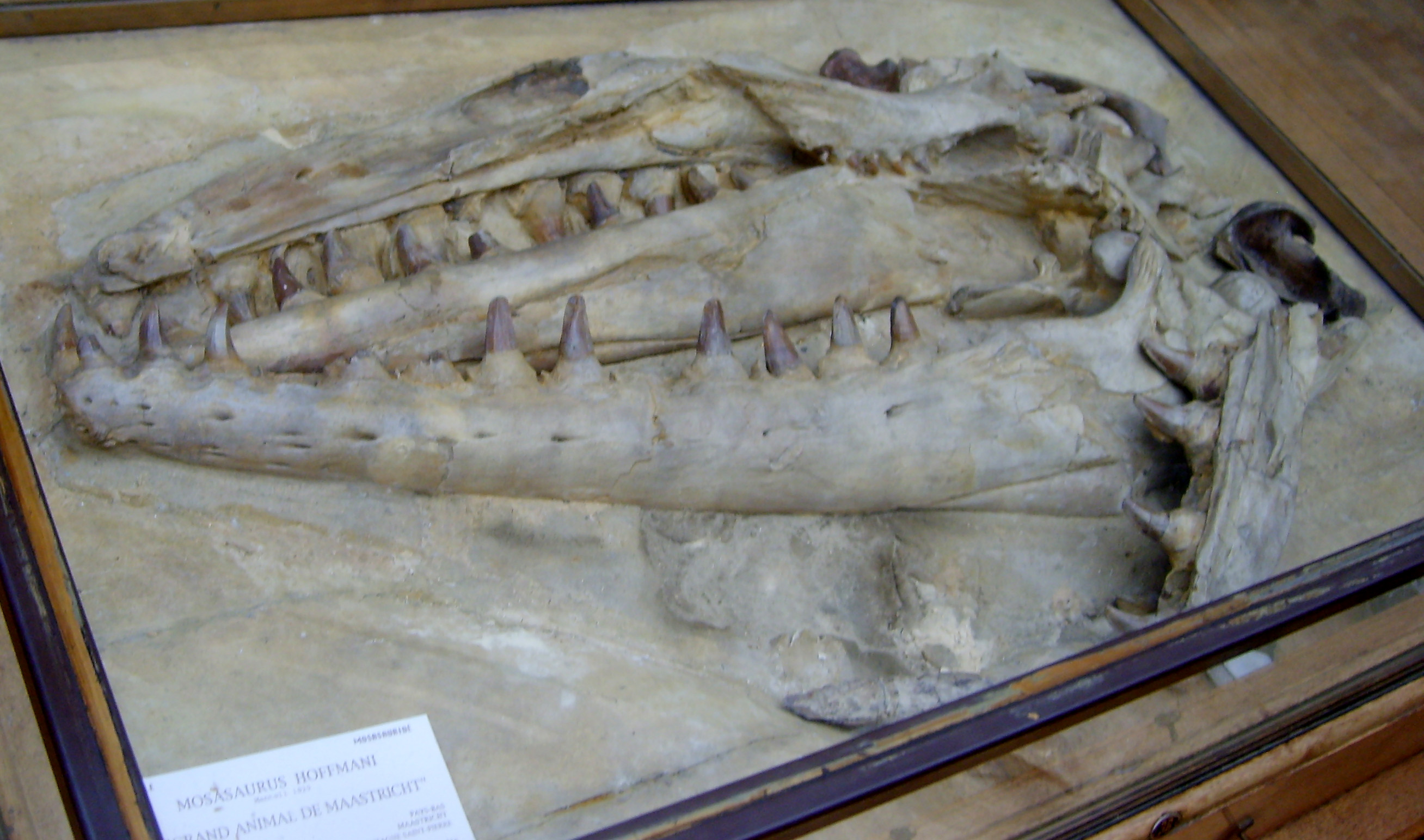
The Mosasaurus hoffmannii skull found in Maastricht between 1770 and 1774

The first publicized discovery of a partial fossil mosasaur skull in 1764 by quarry workers in a subterranean gallery of a limestone quarry in Mount Saint Peter, near the Dutch city of Maastricht, preceded any major dinosaur fossil discoveries, but remained little known. However, a second find of a partial skull drew the Age of Enlightenment's attention to the existence of fossilized animals that were different from any known living creatures. When the specimen was discovered between 1770 and 1774, Johann Leonard Hoffmann, a surgeon and fossil collector, corresponded about it with the most influential scientists of his day, making the fossil famous. The original owner, though, was Godding, a canon of Maastricht cathedral.

When the French revolutionary forces occupied Maastricht in 1794, the carefully hidden fossil was uncovered, after a reward, it is said, of 600 bottles of wine, and transported to Paris. After it had been earlier interpreted as a fish, a crocodile, and a sperm whale, the first to understand its lizard affinities was the Dutch scientist Adriaan Gilles Camper in 1799. In 1808, Georges Cuvier confirmed this conclusion, although le Grand Animal fossile de Maëstricht was not actually named Mosasaurus ('Meuse reptile') until 1822 and not given its full species name, Mosasaurus hoffmannii, until 1829. Several sets of mosasaur remains, which had been discovered earlier at Maastricht but were not identified as mosasaurs until the 19th century, have been on display in the Teylers Museum, Haarlem, procured from 1790.

The Maastricht limestone beds were rendered so famous by the mosasaur discovery, they have given their name to the final six-million-year epoch of the Cretaceous, the Maastrichtian.

== Classification ==
=== Relationship with modern squamates ===
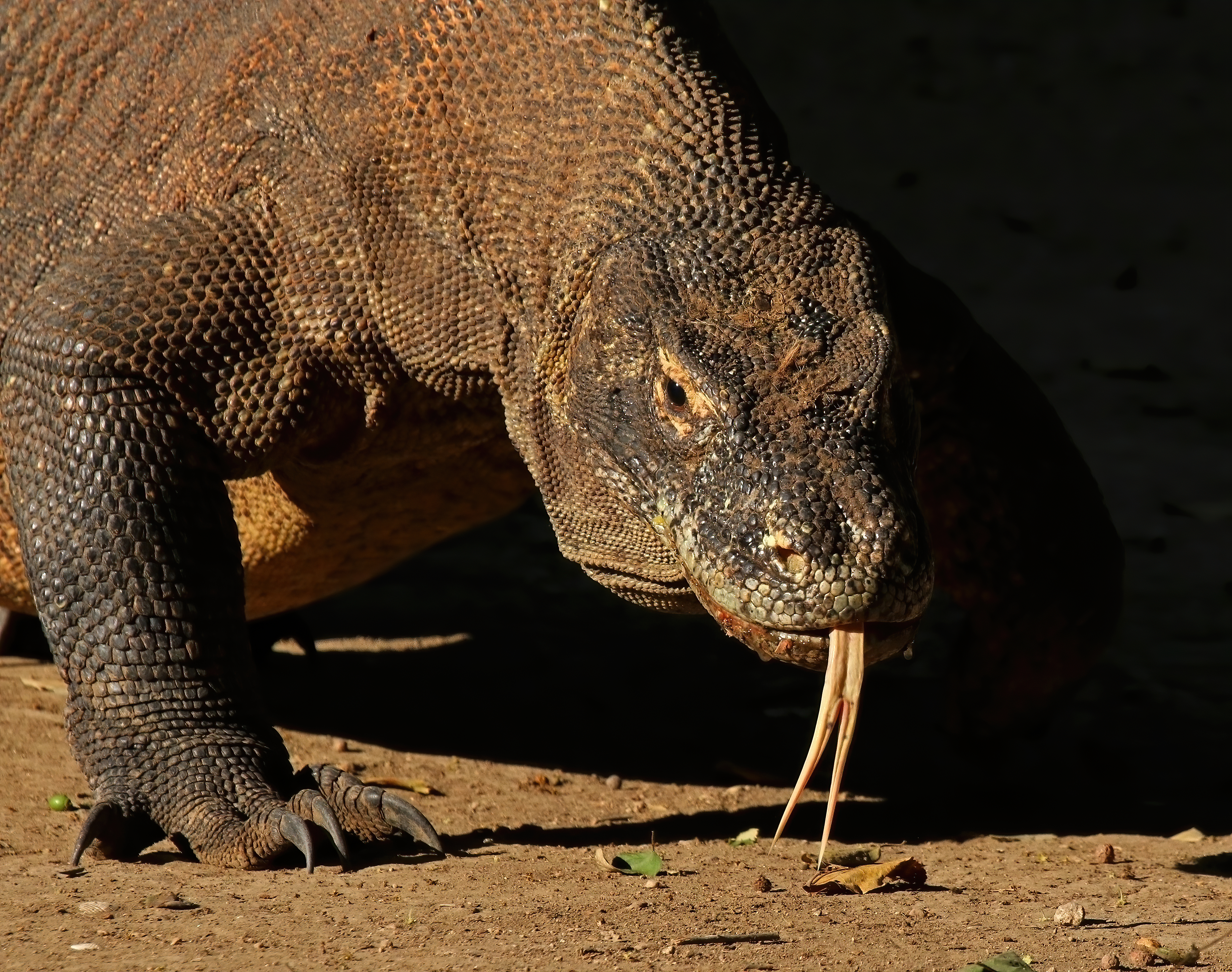
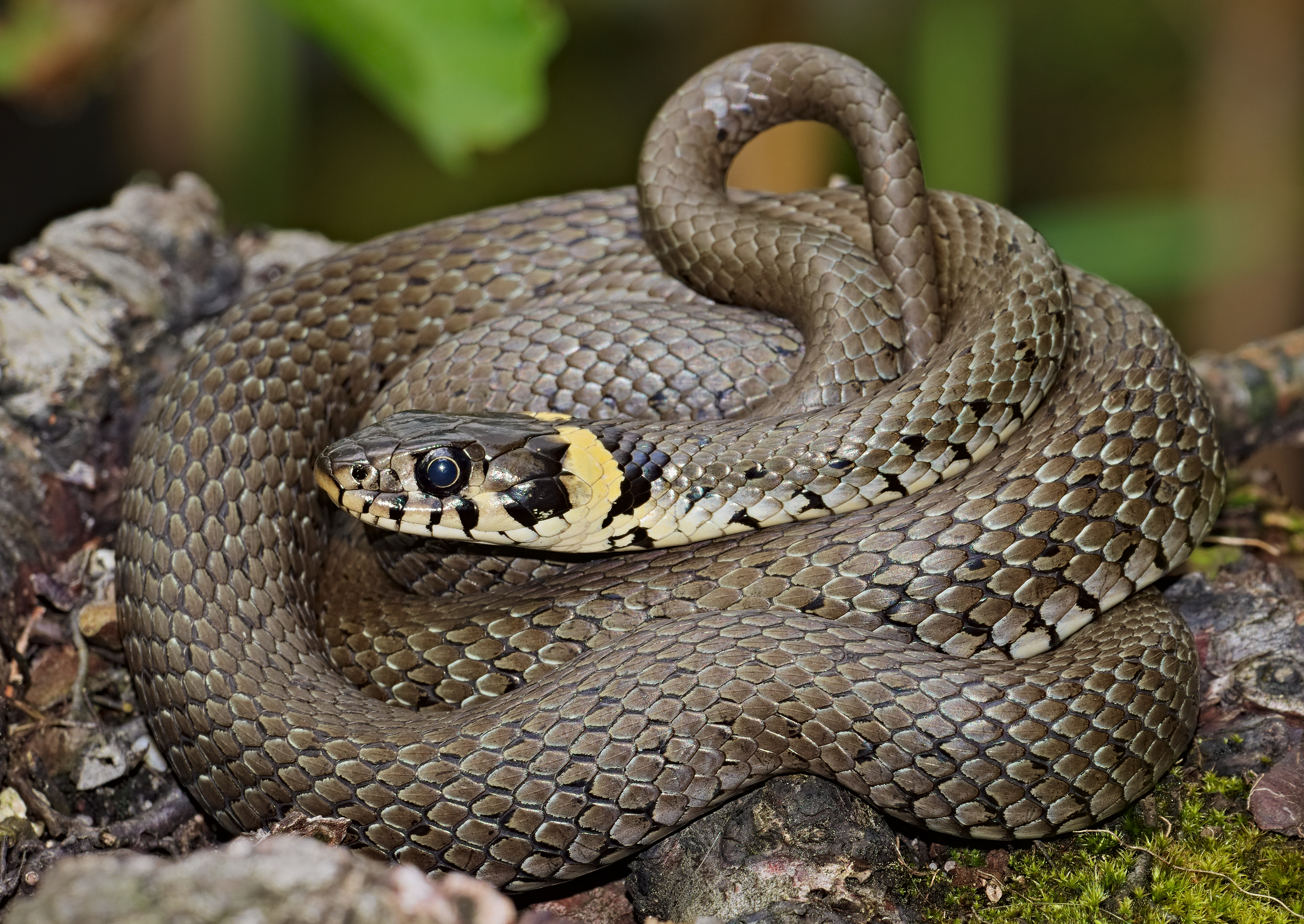
Scientists continue to debate on whether monitor lizards (left) or snakes (right) are the closest living relatives of mosasaurs.

=== Lower classifications ===
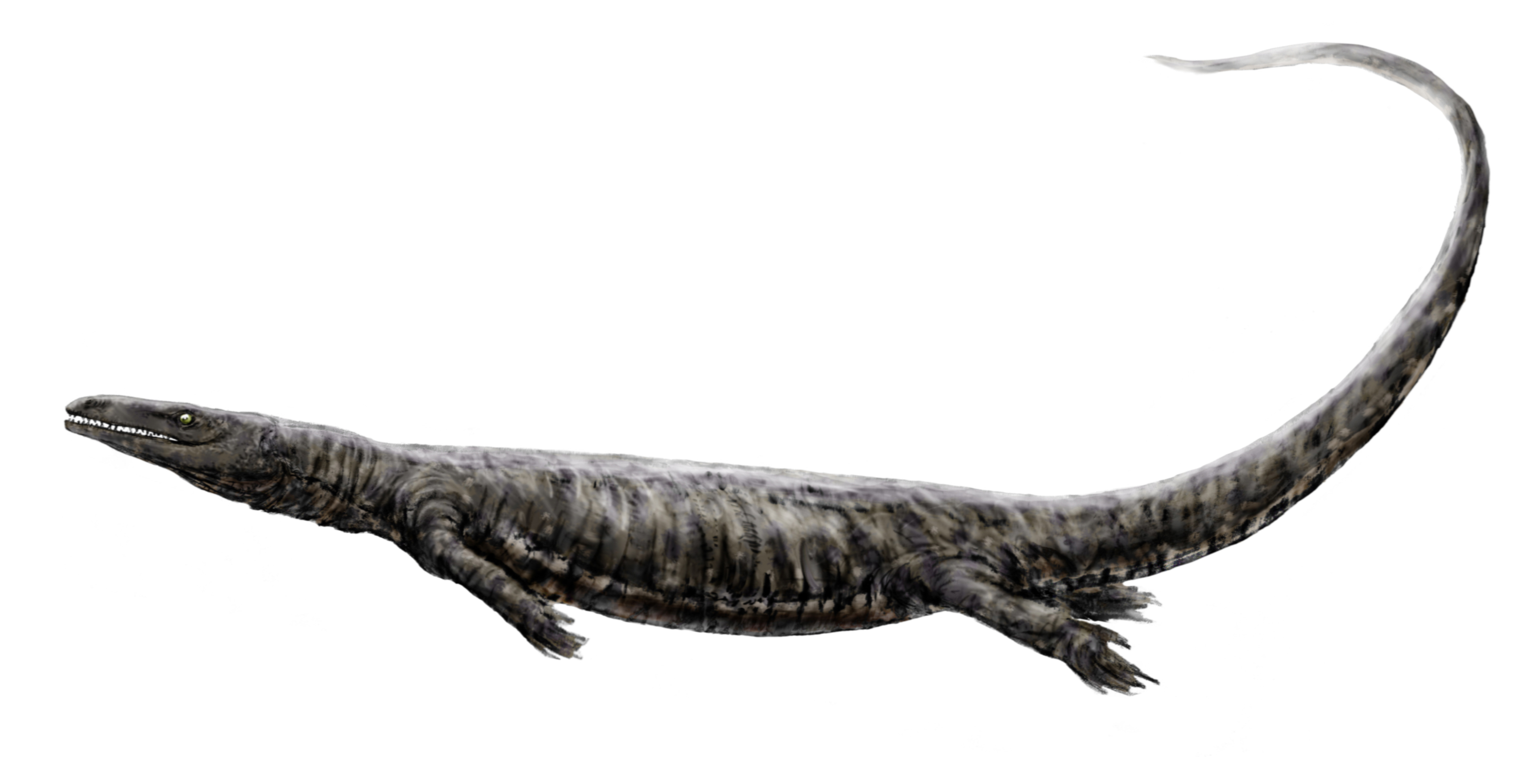
Restoration of Opetiosaurus bucchichi, a basal mosasauroid

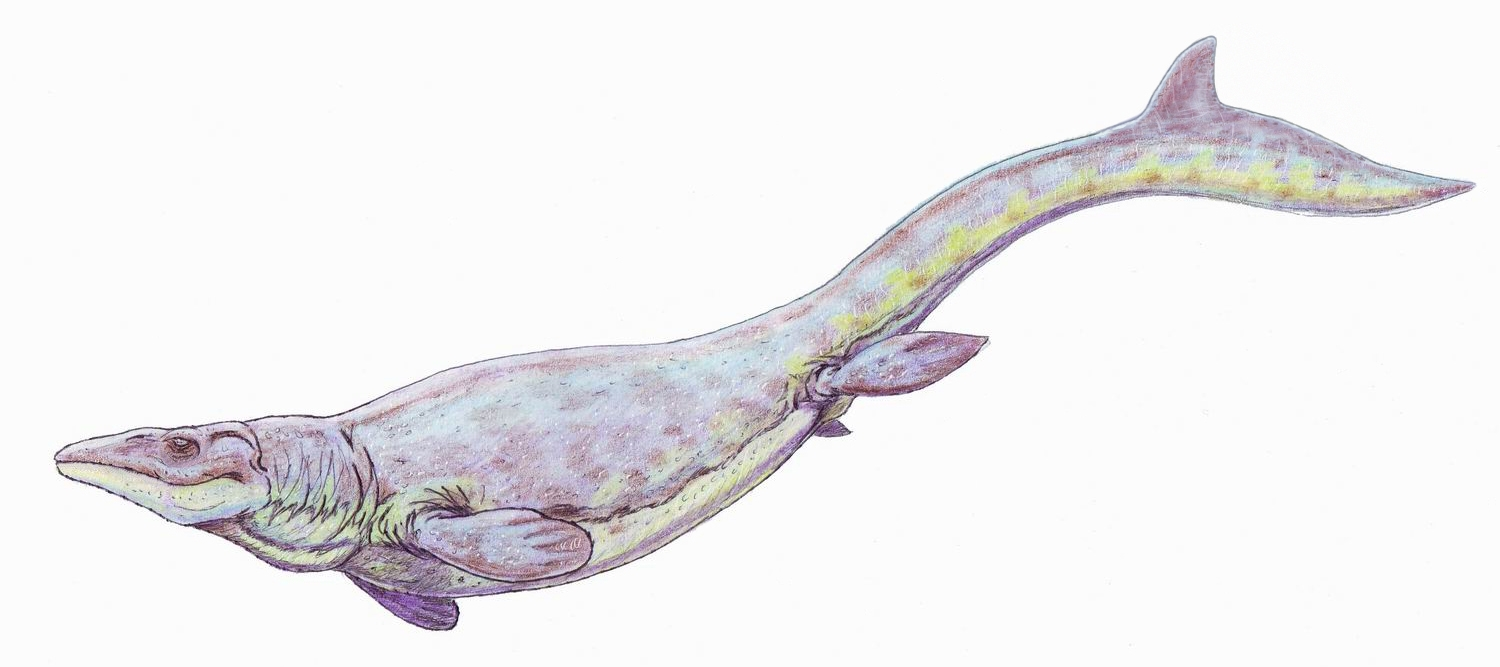
Life restoration of a mosasaurine, Globidens alabamaensis

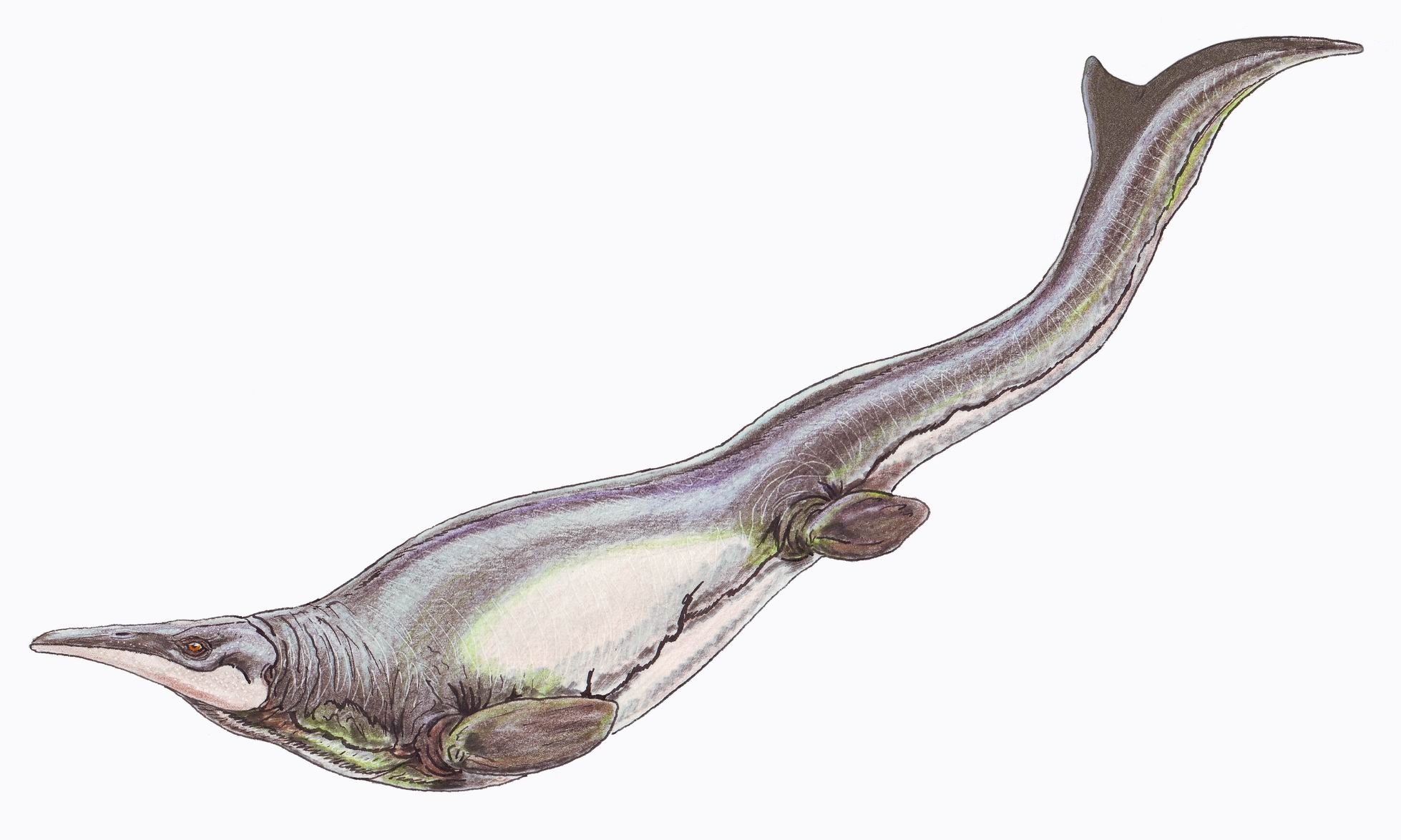
Life restoration of a mosasaurine, Plotosaurus bennisoni

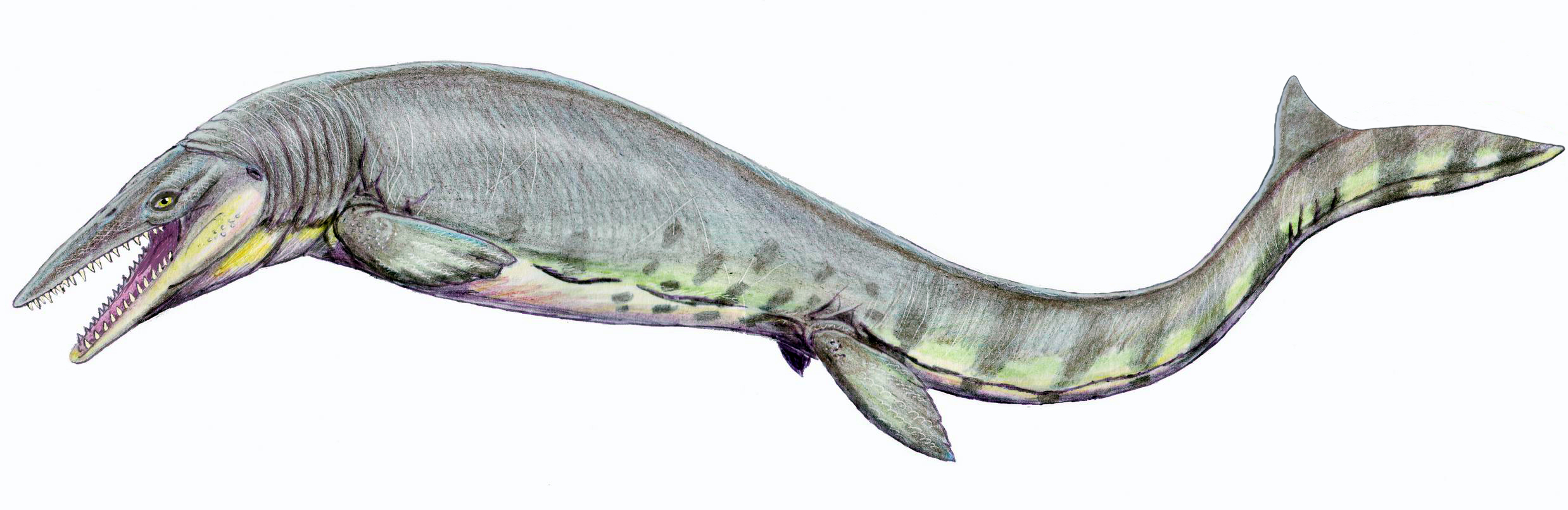
Restoration of a tylosaurine, Tylosaurus pembinensis

The traditional view of mosasaur evolution held that all paddle-limbed (hydropedal) mosasaurs originated from a single common ancestor with functional legs (plesiopedal). However, this was shaken with the discovery of Dallasaurus, a plesiopedal mosasauroid more closely related to the Mosasaurinae than other mosasaurs. Bell and Polycn (2005) grouped these outside mosasaurs into two clades: the Russellosaurina, whose basal members include plesiopedal genera (Tethysaurinae) of their own and derived members consisting of the Plioplatecarpinae and Tylosaurinae; and the Halisauromorpha, containing the Halisaurinae. The placement of Dallasaurus suggested that the Russellosaurina and Halisauromorpha may have evolved a hydropedal form independently, the former through the tethysaurines, meaning that their placement within the Mosasauridae creates an unnatural polyphyly and thus potentially invalid. Caldwell informally proposed in a 2012 publication that the definition of a mosasaur must thus be redefined into one that does not consider russellosaurines and halisauromorphs as true mosasaurs, but as an independent group of marine lizards.

However, phylogenetic studies of mosasaurs can be fickle, especially when wildcard taxa like Dallasaurus remain poorly understood. For example, some studies such as a 2009 analysis by Dutchak and Caldwell instead found that Dallasaurus was ancestral to both russellosaurines and mosasaurines, although results were inconsistent in later studies. A 2017 study by Simoes et al. noted that utilization of different methods of phylogenetic analyses can yield different findings and ultimately found an indication that tethysaurines were a case of hydropedal mosasaurs reversing back to a plesiopedal condition rather than an independent ancestral feature.

The following cladograms illustrate the two views of mosasaur evolution. Topology A follows an ancestral state reconstruction from an implied weighted maximum parsimony tree by Simoes et al. (2017), which contextualizes a single marine origin with tethysaurine reversal. Topologies B and C illustrate the multiple-origins hypothesis of hydropedality; the former follows Makádi et al. (2012), while the latter follows a PhD dissertation by Mekarski (2017) that experimentally includes dolichosaur and poorly-represented aigialosaur taxa. Placement of major group names follow definitions by Madzia and Cau (2017).

Topology A:
Ancestral state reconstruction by Simoes et al. (2017)

- - Adriosaurus suessi
  - - Dolichosaurus longicollis
    - - - Komensaurus carrolli
        - - Pontosaurus kornhuberi
          - - Aigialosaurus dalmaticus
            - Opetiosaurus bucchichi
      - - - Halisaurinae
          - Russellosaurina
            - - - Yaguarasaurus columbianus
                - - Russellosaurus coheni
                  - Romeosaurus fumanensis
              - - Tethysaurus nopcsai
                - Pannoniasaurus inexpectatus
            - - Tylosaurinae
              - Plioplatecarpinae
        - Mosasaurinae
          - Dallasaurus turneri
          - - Clidastes
            - Derived mosasaurines

Iliac crest attached to sacral ribs
Free-standing iliac crest
Ambiguous state

Topology B:
Strict consensus of maximum parsimony by Makádi et al. (2012)

- - Varanus spp.
  - - Aigialosaurus
    - - Russellosaurina
        - - Pannoniasaurus inexpectatus
          - - Tethysaurus nopcsai
            - - Yaguarasaurus columbianus
              - Russellosaurus coheni
        - - Carsosaurus marchesetti
          - Komensaurus carrolli
          - - Haasiasaurus gittelmani
            - - Halisaurinae
              - - Tylosaurinae
                - Plioplatecarpinae
      - Mosasaurinae
        - Dallasaurus turneri
        - - Clidastes
          - - - Globidensini
              - Prognathodontini
            - Mosasaurini

Plesiopedal and plesiopelvic taxa
Plesiopedal and hydropelvic taxa
Hydropedal and hydropelvic taxa
Taxa with unknown limb structure

Topology C:
Maximum clade credibility tree by Mekarski (2017)

- - - Varanus spp.
    - - - Aigialosaurus dalmaticus
        - Opetiosaurus bucchichi
      - Komensaurus carrolli
      - Haasiasaurus gittelmani
      - - Halisaurinae
        - Russellosaurina
          - - Tethysaurus nopcsai
            - Russellosaurus coheni
          - - Yaguarasaurus columbianus
            - - Tylosaurinae
              - Plioplatecarpinae
  - Mosasaurinae
    - - - Adriosaurus skrbinensis
        - - Acteosaurus tommasinii
          - Pontosaurus
      - - Mesoleptos zendrinii
        - - Adriosaurus microbranchis
          - - Adriosaurus suessi
            - Dolichosaurus longicollis
    - - Carsosaurus marchesetti
      - - Eidolosaurus trauthi
        - - Portunatasaurus krambergeri
          - - Vallecillosaurus donrobertoi
            - - Dallasaurus turneri
              - - Clidastes
                - - Prognathodontini
                  - Mosasaurini

'Dolichosaur' taxa
'Aigialosaur' taxa
Mosasaur taxa

=== Phylogeny ===
The following diagram illustrates simplified phylogenies of the three major mosasaur groups as recovered by Strong et al. (2020), Longrich et al. (2021), and Longrich et al. (2022).

Russellosaurina
Implied weighting maximum parsimony by Strong et al. (2020)

- Russellosaurina
  - Yaguarasaurinae
    - Yaguarasaurus
    - - Russellosaurus
      - Romeosaurus
  - - Tethysaurinae
      - Tethysaurus
      - Pannoniasaurus
    - - Tylosaurinae
        - Taniwhasaurus
        - Tylosaurus
      - Plioplatecarpinae
        - Ectenosaurus
        - - Plesioplatecarpus
          - - - Angolasaurus
              - - Goronyosaurus
                - - Selmasaurus
                  - Gavialimimus
            - - Latoplatecarpus
              - - Platecarpus
                - Plioplatecarpus

Halisaurinae
Strict consensus of maximum parsimony by Longrich et al., (2021)

- Halisaurinae
  - Pluridensini
    Pluridens
  - Halisaurini
    - Eonatator
    - - Phosphorosaurus
      - Halisaurus

Mosasaurinae
Maximum parsimony by Longrich et al. (2022)

- Mosasaurinae
  - Kourisodon
  - - Clidastes
    - - - Eremiasaurus
        - - Globidensini
            Globidens
          - Prognathodontini
            - Gnathomortis
            - - Prognathodon
              - Thalassotitan
      - Mosasaurini
        - Moanasaurus
        - - - Carinodens
            - Xenodens
          - - Mosasaurus
            - - Plesiotylosaurus
              - Plotosaurus

== Distribution ==
Though no individual genus or subfamily is found worldwide, the Mosasauridae as a whole achieved global distribution during the Late Cretaceous with many locations typically having complex mosasaur faunas with multiple different genera and species in different ecological niches.

Two African countries are particularly rich in mosasaurs: Morocco and Angola.
