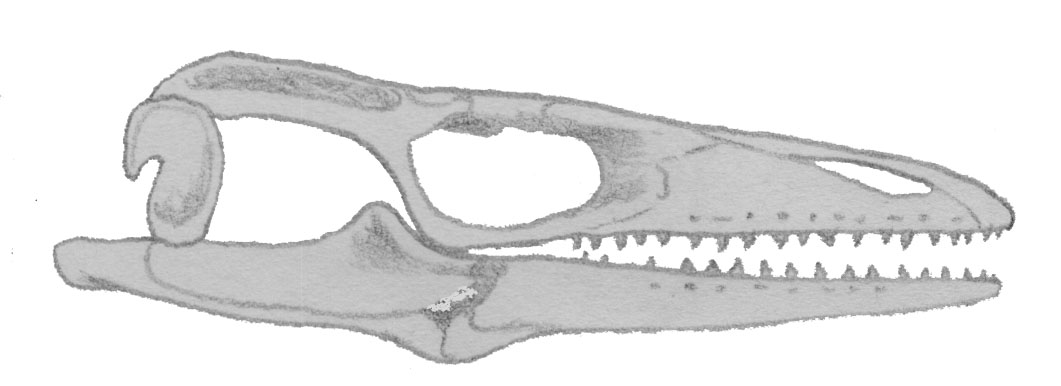
- Skull of Opetiosaurus

Scientific classification
- Kingdom: Animalia
- Phylum: Chordata
- Class: Reptilia
- Order: Squamata
- Clade: †Mosasauria
- Superfamily: †Mosasauroidea
- Family: †Aigialosauridae; Kramberger, 1892

Genera
- †Aigialosaurus; †Opetiosaurus

= Aigialosauridae =

Aigialosauridae Temporal range: Cenomanian, 99.7–94.3 Ma

Extinct family of lizards

Aigialosauridae (from Greek, aigialos, meaning "seashore", and sauros, "lizard") is a family of Late Cretaceous semiaquatic pythonomorph lizards closely related to the mosasaurs. Regarded by some paleontologists as a distinct monophyletic group and by others as an adaptive grade within the basal mosasauroids, recent molecular and morphological data suggests that they are the oldest known members of the lineage leading to the mosasaurs.

The family is recognized as containing two species, normally classified into two genera; Aigialosaurus and Opetiosaurus. When used as an adaptive grade rather than as an actual monophyletic group, many other basal mosasauroids of uncertain affinities are occasionally referred to as "aigialosaurs", such as the genera Komensaurus, Haasiasaurus, Carsosaurus and Dallasaurus and even entire mosasaur clades, such as the Tethysaurinae. The term "plesiopedal mosasaurs" or "mosasaurs with a plesiopedal limb condition" is a more formal way to refer to such primitive species firmly within the family Mosasauridae.

== Description ==
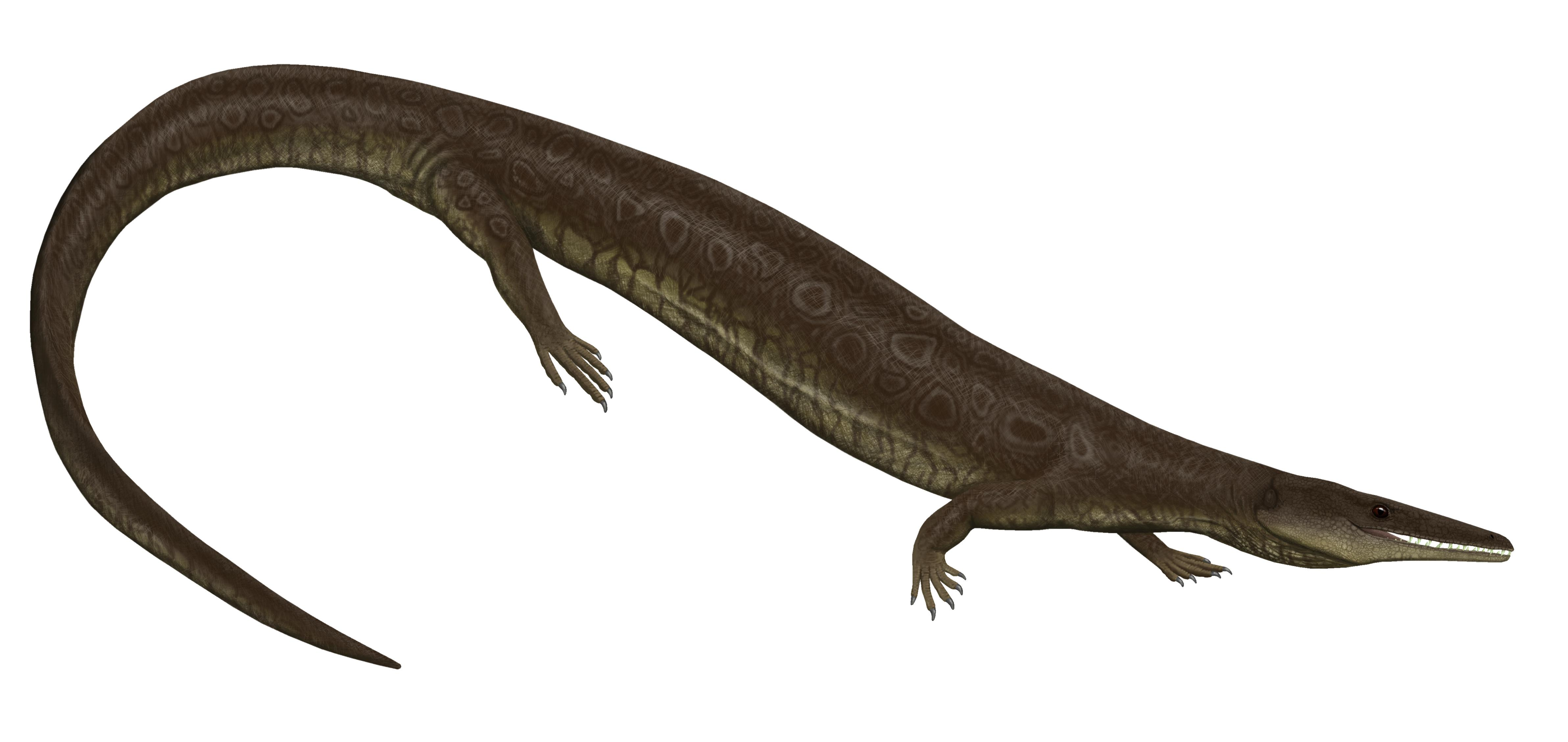
Life restoration of Aigialosaurus dalmaticus.

Aigialosaurids were semi-aquatic lizards that inhabited shallow marine environments in the ancient Tethys Ocean, the only known fossils having been recovered from Croatia. Their skulls are similar to the skulls of more derived mosasaurs, though the postcranial skeleton is far more similar to that of terrestrial lizards.

== Classification ==
The systematics and taxonomy of the Aigialosauridae is controversial and has a problematic history. Despite thorough reviews of the relationships between early Mosasauroidea and redescriptions of the two normally recognized aigialosaurid genera, Aigialosaurus and Opetiosaurus, the status of the family remains uncertain.

Dutchak & Caldwell (2009) designated Opetiosaurus as a junior synonym of Aigialosaurus (as Aigialosaurus bucchichi), which suggested a very close relationship between the two. Their own analysis does not strictly support such a conclusion, and neither do subsequent analyses. Indeed, analyses done by Madzia & Cau (2017) show that the two genera are not necessarily more closely related to each other than either is to more derived mosasauroids, suggesting not only that Opetiosaurus is a valid genus, but also calling the validity of the Aigialosauridae as a monophyletic group into question. They defined Aigialosauridae as "the most inclusive clade containing Aigialosaurus dalmaticus and Opetiosaurus bucchichi, but not Dolichosaurus longicollis, Adriosaurus suessi, Pontosaurus lesinensis, or the clade originating with the most recent common ancestor of Halisaurus platyspondylus, Mosasaurus hoffmannii, and Tylosaurus proriger". This definition highlights the instability of "aigialosaur" phylogeny and ensures that the name Aigialosauridae is only used in the cases when Aigialosaurus dalmaticus and Opetiosaurus bucchichi form a clade to exclusion of more derived mosasauroids.
