= Kornhuber =

Kornhuber is a German occupational surname for a farmer. Notable people with this name include:

- Andreas Kornhuber (1824–1905), Austrian naturalist and paleontologist.
- Hans Helmut Kornhuber (1928–2009), German neurologist and neurophysiologist
- Johannes Kornhuber (born 1959), German psychiatrist and psychotherapist
