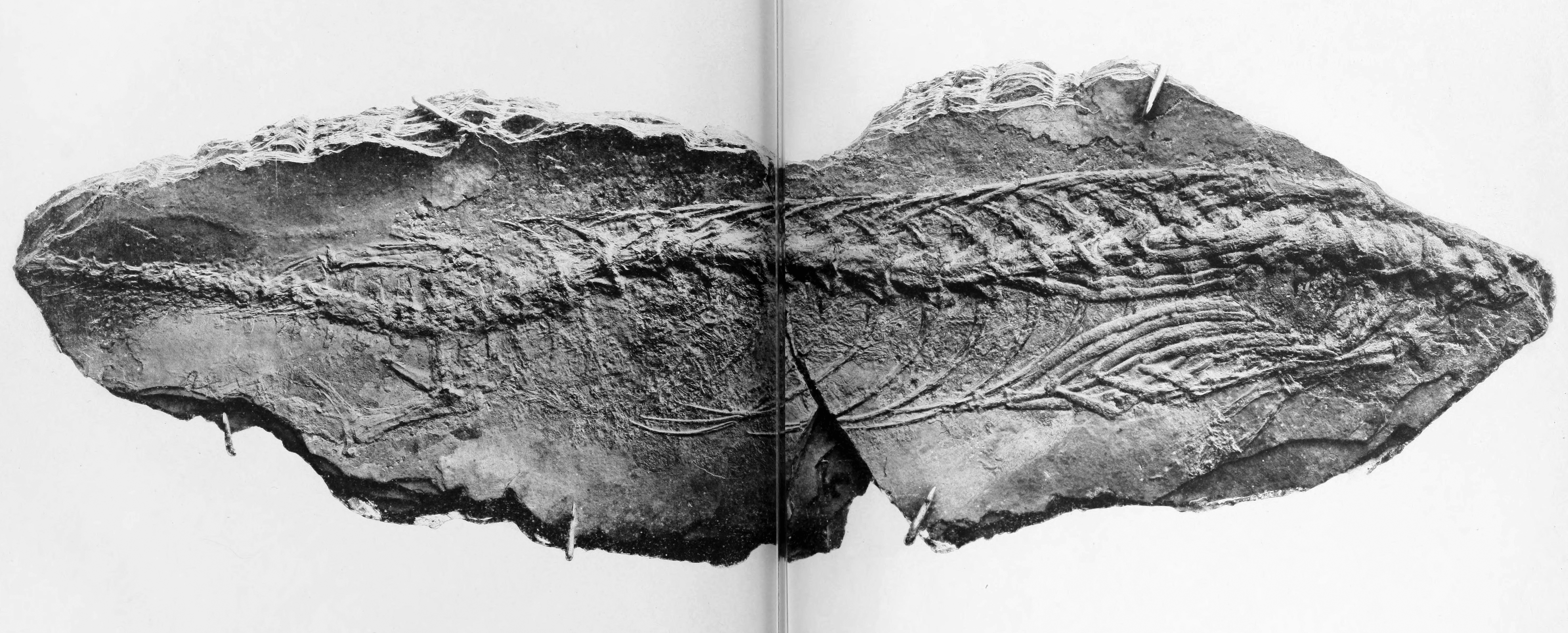
- Holotype of C. marchesetti

Scientific classification
- Kingdom: Animalia
- Phylum: Chordata
- Class: Reptilia
- Order: Squamata
- Clade: †Mosasauria
- Family: †Aigialosauridae
- Genus: †Carsosaurus; Kornhuber, 1893

Type species
- †Carsosaurus marchesetti Kornhuber, 1893

= Carsosaurus =

Carsosaurus Temporal range: Late Cretaceous, Cenomanian–Turonian

Extinct genus of lizards

Carsosaurus is a genus of extinct amphibious reptiles, in the mosasaur superfamily, containing only the species Carsosaurus marchesetti. It is known from a single individual from the Komen Limestone of Slovenia. The specimen is well-preserved, containing many different bones as well as some skin impressions and sternal cartilage. While more remains are needed to be certain, it is generally thought to belong to Aigialosauridae. In life, it was an amphibious creature that spent most of its time on land, although its later relatives were fully aquatic.

== Discovery and naming ==
Carsosaurus marchesetti was described from a single, mostly complete skeleton at the Museo Civico di Storia Naturale di Trieste, uncovered from the Karst Plateau near Komen (modern-day Slovenia) by Andreas Kornhuber in 1893. He compared it to Acteosaurus tommasinii, as both were uncovered from the same area. There were numerous noticeable differences between the two, and Kornhuber concluded that they were not closely related at all: Acteosaurus tommasinii belonged to the family Dolichosauridae, while Carsosaurus more closely resembled a monitor lizard. For the "beautiful and memorable lizard of the Karst", in his words, he chose the genus name Carsosaurus. The specific epithet marchesetti was in honour of the museum's director, Dr. Carlo de Marchesetti.

== Description ==
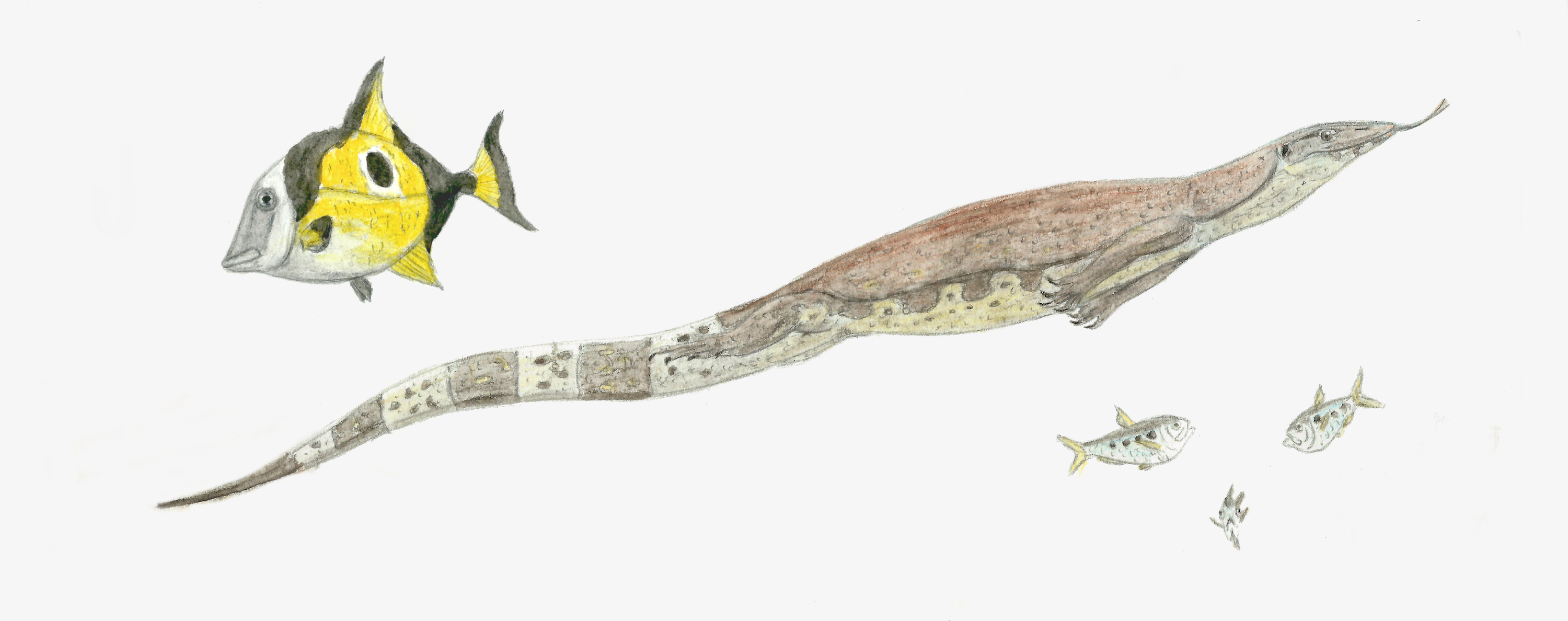
Life restoration based on known material and close relatives. Carsosaurus is depicted alongside contemporary fish Coelodus and Diplomystus

Carsosaurus is known only from a single specimen, currently housed at the Museo Civico di Storia Naturale di Trieste. It is missing the skull, anterior cervical vertebrae, and much of the tail, but is otherwise very complete. The total length of the parts preserved is 97.5 centimetres (3 ft 2.4 in). Kornhuber hypothesised that the mostly absent tail may have been twice as long as the body — 67 centimetres (2 ft 2 in) — at 130 to 140 centimetres (4 ft 3 in to 4 ft 7 in). At its trunk, the skeleton is 14.5 centimetres (5.7 in) wide. There are only 3 cervical vertebrae present (the 3 furthest from the head), but in life there were likely 7–9. Similarly, only 12 caudal vertebrae (located in the tail) are present in the fossil, however there may have been over 100. There are 5 pairs of true ribs, and a presumed 3–4 additional pairs of false ribs. Impressions of the epidermis are preserved as well, which show rhombus-shaped scales, thickened at the margins. There is also some mineralised sternal cartilage, which is large and shield-shaped.

== Classification ==
Kornhuber initially classified Carsosaurus as a member of the Aigialosauridae, due to its post-cranial features. A century later, in 1995, a quantitative analysis including fossils of other species found in the intervening years supported this phylogenetic placement. Due to the lack of a skull, it is cannot be determined whether C. marchesetti might belong to the genus Aigialosaurus. Because Aigialosaurus is the older name, Carsosaurus can therefore be considered a nomen dubium.

== Paleobiology ==
Kornhuber considered Carsosaurus to be amphibious, although mainly land-dwelling. It long tail may have served as an emergency rudder, as well as a tool for defence, grasping, climbing, and propulsion. Its fossil contains what Kornhuber interpreted as the remains of many small fishes, lizards, and possibly amphibians, indicating that Carsosaurus was a hunter that consumed live prey whole. However, in 2001, Caldwell and Michael S.Y. Lee proposed that these were not gut contents, but rather the remains of embryos. Their positioning indicates that they would have been born tail-first, to lessen the chance of drowning, as this way their nostrils would emerge last. Since one is located in the pelvis, it is possible that the specimen died while giving birth. The ability of Carsosaurus and other early amphibious aigialosaurs to give live birth would have lessened their dependency on land, allowing their evolution into massive, fully aquatic mosasaurs, which existed from 98 million years ago until the end of the Cretaceous.

== Paleoecology ==
The single known specimen of Carsosaurus lived sometime between the Cenomanian and Turonian, in the Upper Cretaceous. During the Cenomanian, much of the Komen area would have been covered by water, with a tropical or subtropical climate. The upper levels were likely well-oxygenated, due to the large number of fish recovered, while the bottom would have been anoxic or dysoxic due to the scarcity of benthic invertebrate fossils. Exposed land would not have been far, given the partially terrestrial habits of many species there, including the aigialosaurs. Other taxa that lived or were likely to have lived in the Komen area during the Upper Cretaceous include Komensaurus (another genus of aigialosaur), Myctophidae (a family of fish whose modern members can be found in deep water throughout the world), hard-shelled molluscs, crustaceans, conifers, and ammonites.

== See also ==
- List of mosasaurs
