= Komensaurus =

Komensaurus Temporal range: Cenomanian-Turonian, 100–93 Ma

Scientific classification
- Kingdom: Animalia
- Phylum: Chordata
- Class: Reptilia
- Order: Squamata
- Clade: †Mosasauria
- Family: †Mosasauridae
- Genus: †Komensaurus; Caldwell & Palci, 2007

Type species
- †Komensaurus carrollii Caldwell & Palci, 2007

Extinct genus of lizards

Komensaurus is a genus of basal aigialosaurid mosasauroid from the Late Cretaceous period. It was found at Komen in Slovenia in limestone dating from the Cenomanian. It was earlier referred to as the "Trieste aigialosaur". In 2007, the type species Komensaurus carrolli was named. Its holotype, specimen MCSNT 11430, was discovered in Slovenia and lived alongside the related Carsosaurus.

== See also ==
- List of mosasaurs
