= Andreas Kornhuber =

Austrian naturalist and paleontologist

Andreas von Kornhuber
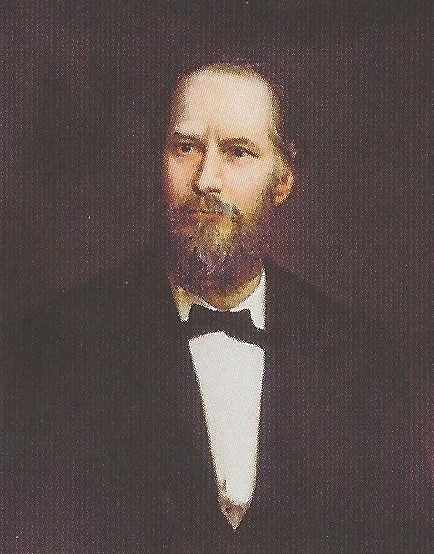
- 1893 portrait of Andreas Kornhuber
- Born: 8 February 1824; Vienna, Austria
- Died: 21 April 1905 (aged 81); Vienna, Austria
- Education: University of Vienna
- Scientific career
- Fields: Natural history, Paleontology, Geology, Botany

(Georg) Andreas von Kornhuber (2 August 1824, Kematen, Oberösterreich – 21 April 1905, Vienna) was an Austrian naturalist and paleontologist.

In 1850 he earned his doctorates in philosophy and medicine from the University of Vienna, followed by several years as an instructor of natural history in Pressburg (1850–60). In 1861 he was appointed professor of geology and botany at the Vienna University of Technology.

He is known for his paleontological investigations of dinosaurs, being credited with providing descriptions of a handful of new genera/species.

- Carsosaurus marchesetti (1893).
- Hydrosaurus lesinensis (1873), now known as Pontosaurus lesinensis.
- Opetiosaurus bucchichi (1901), synonymous with Aigialosaurus bucchichi.

== Written works ==
- Beitrag zur Kenntniss der klimatischen Verhältnisse Presburg's: Mit zwei chromolithographischen Tafeln, 1858 – Contribution to the knowledge of the climatic conditions of Pressburg, with two chromolithographic tables.
- Bemerkungen über das Vorkommen der Fische um Presburg und an einigen anderen Orten Ungerns, 1863 – Remarks on the presence of fish to Pressburg and a few other locations in Hungary.
- Über einen neuen Fossilen Saurier aus Lesina, 1873 – On a new fossilized dinosaur from Lesina.
- Carsosaurus marchesettii, ein neuer Fossiler lacertilier aus den Kreideschichten des Karstes bei Komen, 1893 – Carsosaurus marchesettii, a new Lacertilian fossil from the Cretaceous formation of karst near Komen.
- Opetiosaurus bucchichi: Eine neue Fossile eidechse aus der unteren Kreide von Lesina in Dalmatien, 1901 – Opetiosaurus bucchichi: A new fossil lizard from the Early Cretaceous of Lesina in Dalmatia.
