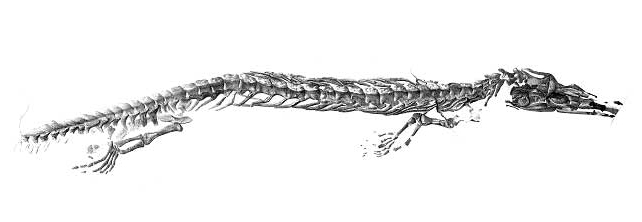
- Illustration of the A. dalmaticus holotype

Scientific classification
- Kingdom: Animalia
- Phylum: Chordata
- Class: Reptilia
- Order: Squamata
- Clade: †Mosasauria
- Family: †Aigialosauridae
- Genus: †Aigialosaurus; Kramberger, 1892
- Species: †A. dalmaticus

Binomial name
- †Aigialosaurus dalmaticus Kramberger, 1892

= Aigialosaurus =

Aigialosaurus Temporal range: Cenomanian, 99.7–94.3 Ma

Extinct genus of lizards

Aigialosaurus is an extinct genus of Late Cretaceous marine or semiaquatic lizard classified as part of the family Aigialosauridae within the Mosasauroidea. Exclusively found in deposits of Cenomanian age near Hvar, Croatia, the genus contains one valid species, A. dalmaticus. According to recent molecular and morphological data, Aigialosaurus is the oldest known member of the lineage leading to large Cretaceous marine reptiles called mosasaurs, a group most closely related to snakes among living squamates. It was a relatively small reptile with a complete specimen measuring 65 cm (2.13 ft) long.

Another primitive mosasauroid, Opetiosaurus, was suggested to represent a second species of Aigialosaurus in 2009, "Aigialosaurus bucchichi", though this conclusion has not been supported by recent analyses.

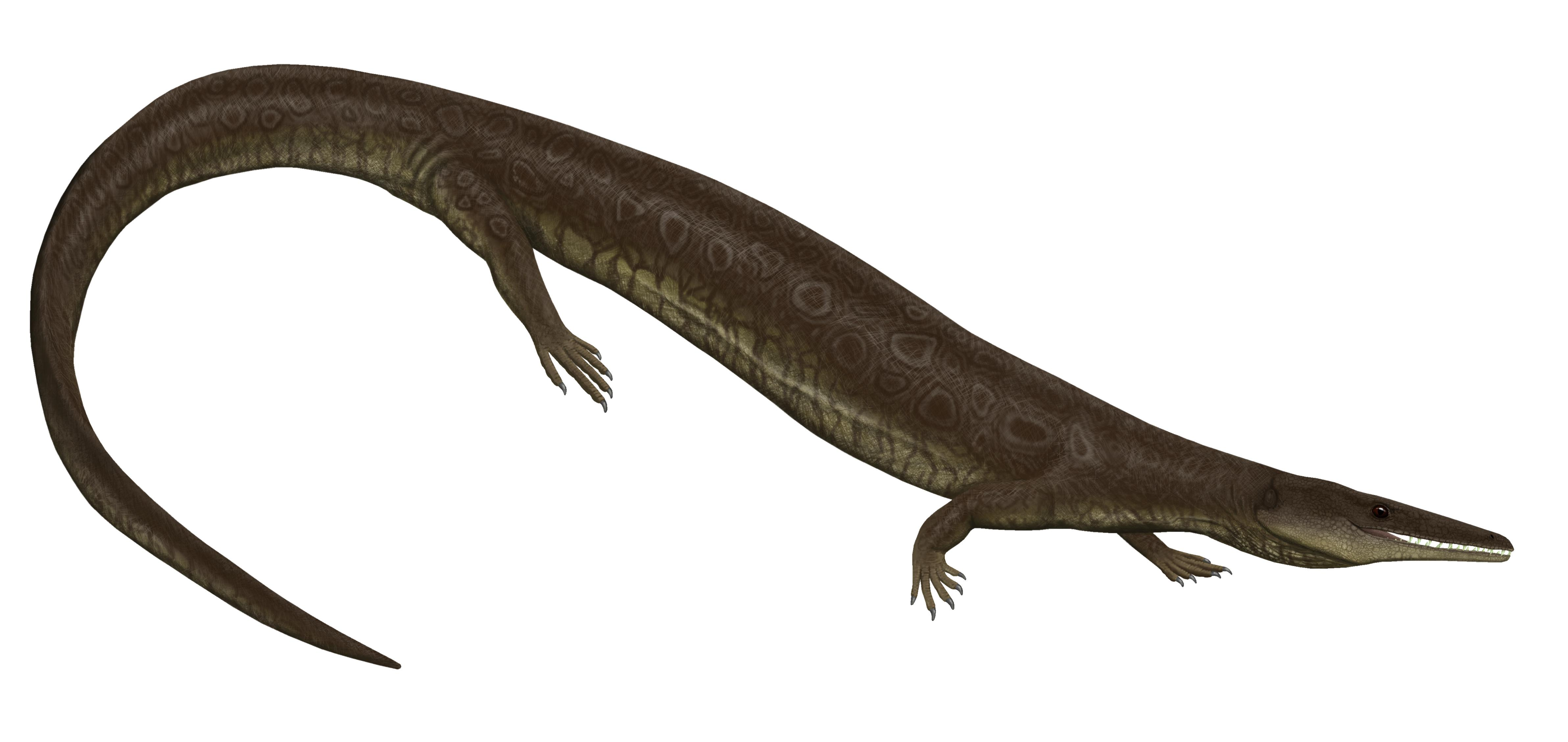
Life restoration of A. dalmaticus
