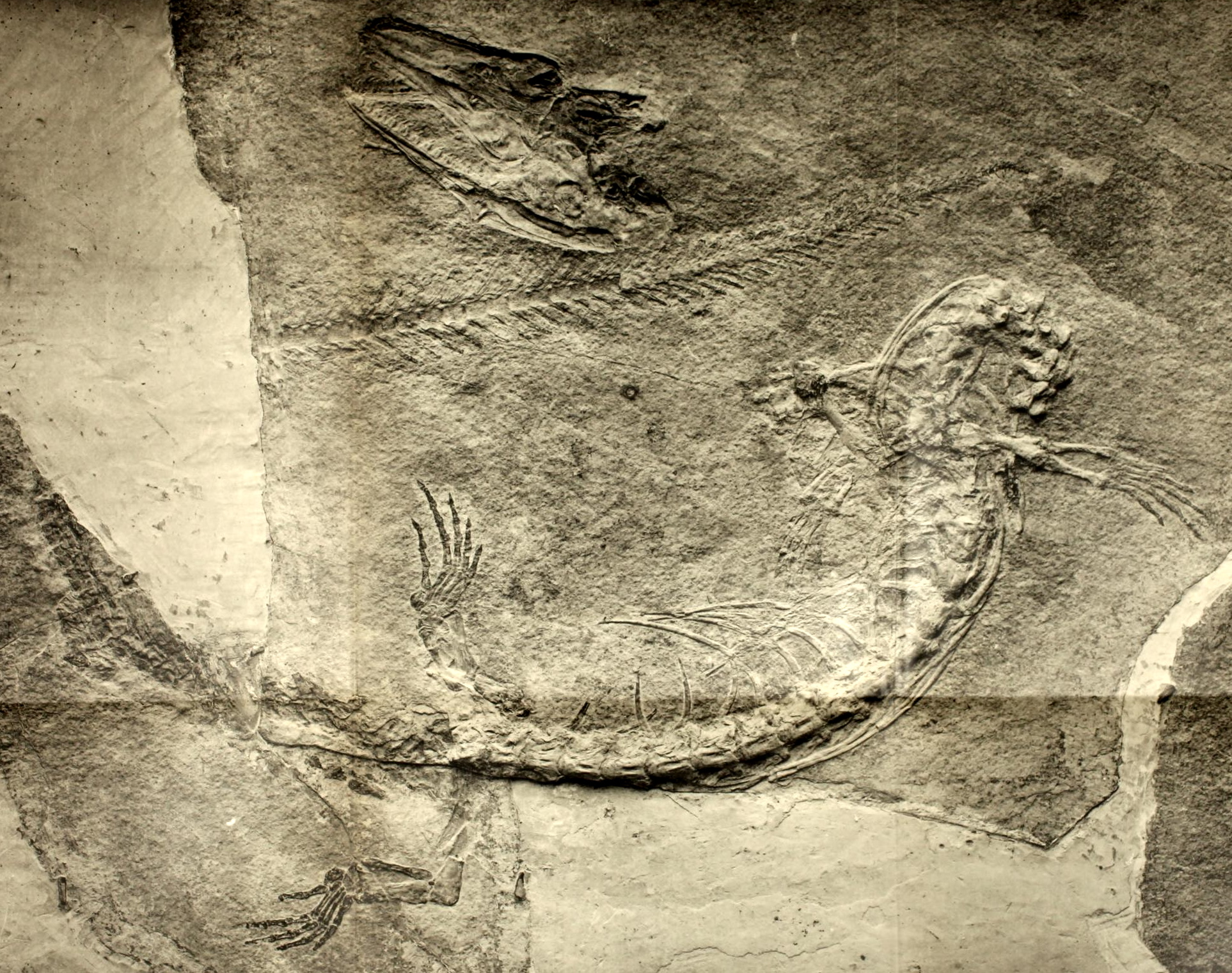
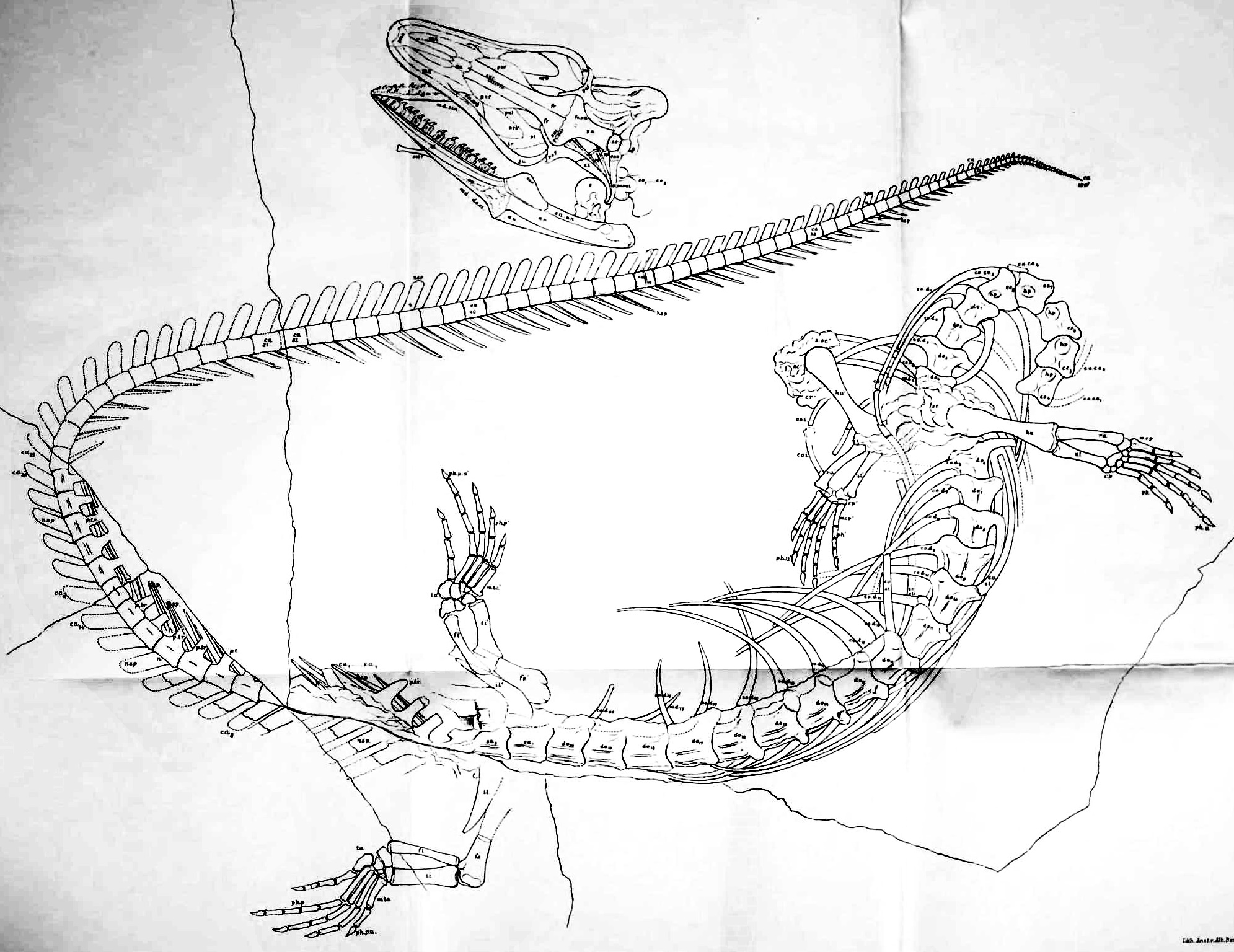
- Photograph (left) and interpretive drawing (right) of O. bucchichi holotype (BSP 1901/002/0001-0005)

Scientific classification
- Kingdom: Animalia
- Phylum: Chordata
- Class: Reptilia
- Order: Squamata
- Clade: †Mosasauria
- Family: †Aigialosauridae
- Genus: †Opetiosaurus; Kornhuber, 1901
- Species: †O. bucchichi

Binomial name
- †Opetiosaurus bucchichi Kornhuber, 1901

= Opetiosaurus =

Opetiosaurus Temporal range: Cenomanian, 99.7–94.3 Ma

Extinct genus of lizards

Opetiosaurus is an extinct genus of Late Cretaceous marine or semiaquatic lizard classified as part of the family Aigialosauridae within the Mosasauroidea. Exclusively found in deposits of Cenomanian age near Hvar, Croatia, the genus contain one valid species, O. bucchichi. It was a small reptile measuring 1 metre (3.3 ft) long.

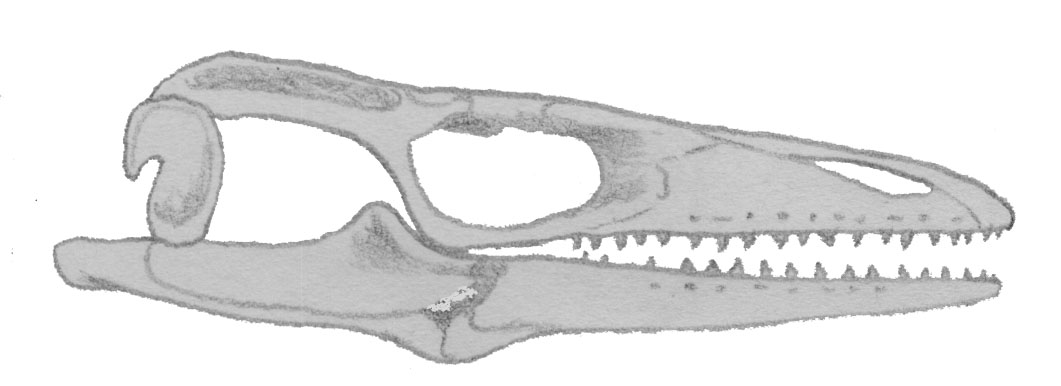
Skull

The genus was diagnosed as congenetic with Aigialosaurus by Dutchak and Caldwell (2009), being re-diagnosed as "Aigialosaurus bucchichi" and only separated by some minor anatomical differences between specimens of the two species. Madzia & Cau (2017) show that the two species are not necessarily more closely related to each other than either is to more derived mosasauroids, suggesting not only that Opetiosaurus is a valid genus, but also calling the validity of the Aigialosauridae as a monophyletic group into question.

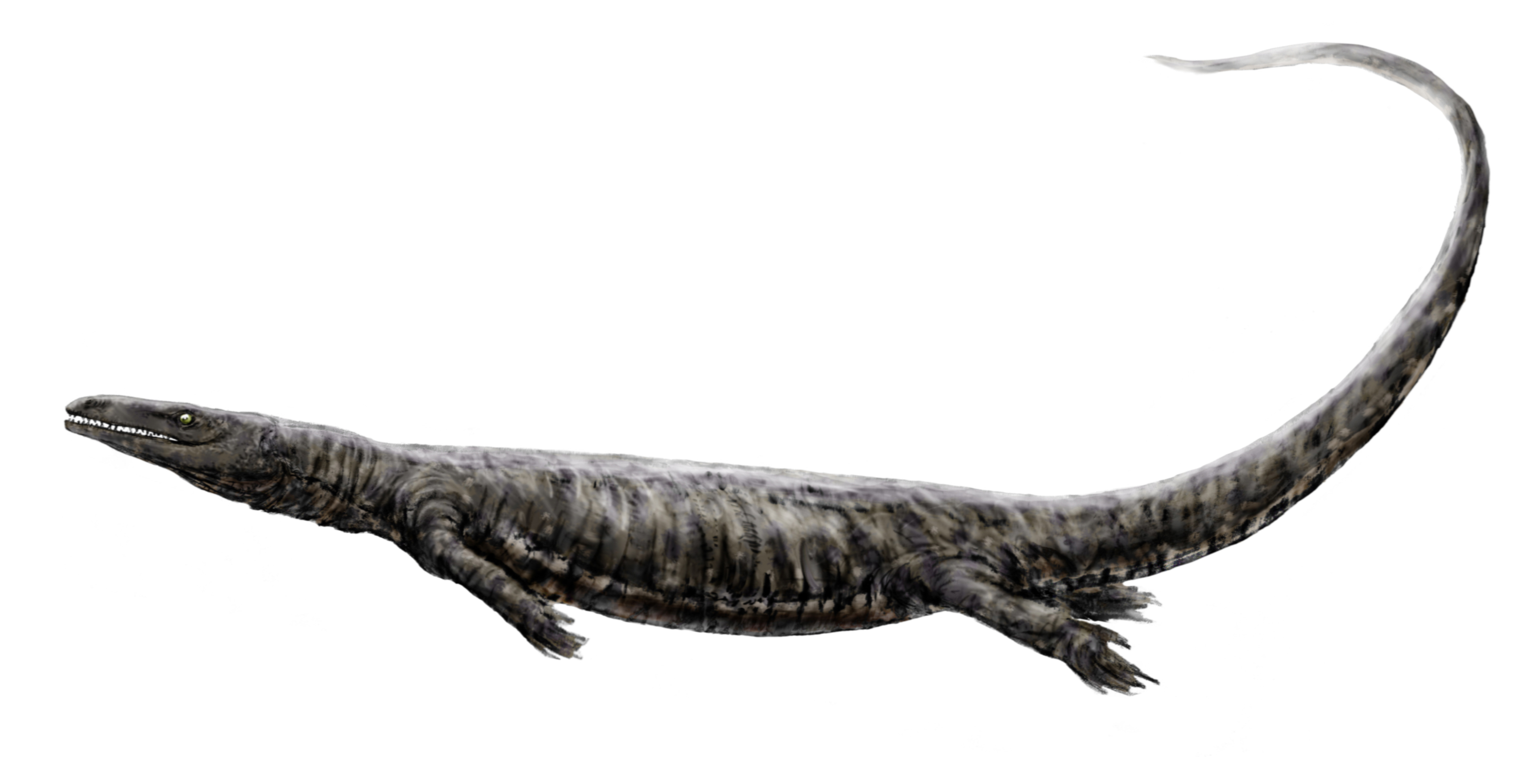
Life restoration of O. bucchichi
