= Haasiasaurus =

Haasiasaurus Temporal range: Cenomanian-Turonian, 100–93 Ma

Scientific classification
- Kingdom: Animalia
- Phylum: Chordata
- Class: Reptilia
- Order: Squamata
- Clade: †Mosasauria
- Superfamily: †Mosasauroidea
- Genus: †Haasiasaurus; Polcyn et al., 2003
- Species: †H. gittelmani

Binomial name
- †Haasiasaurus gittelmani (Polcyn et al., 1999)

Synonyms
- Haasia Polcyn et al., 1999 (preoccupied)

Extinct genus of lizards

Haasiasaurus is an extinct genus of early mosasauroid. The genus contains a single species, H. gittelmani, which was found in Cenomanian to Turonian (Upper Cretaceous, about 100 to 93 million years ago) rocks near Ein Yabrud, in the Palestinian West Bank, approximately 20 kilometres (12 mi) north of Jerusalem. It was named in honour of the palaeontologist Georg Haas, replacing the original name Haasia which was preoccupied by a millipede. Haasiasaurus was one of the oldest mosasauroids, measuring 1 metre (3.3 ft) long. The genus potentially represents a chimera, since the cranial and postcranial material were not found in association.
