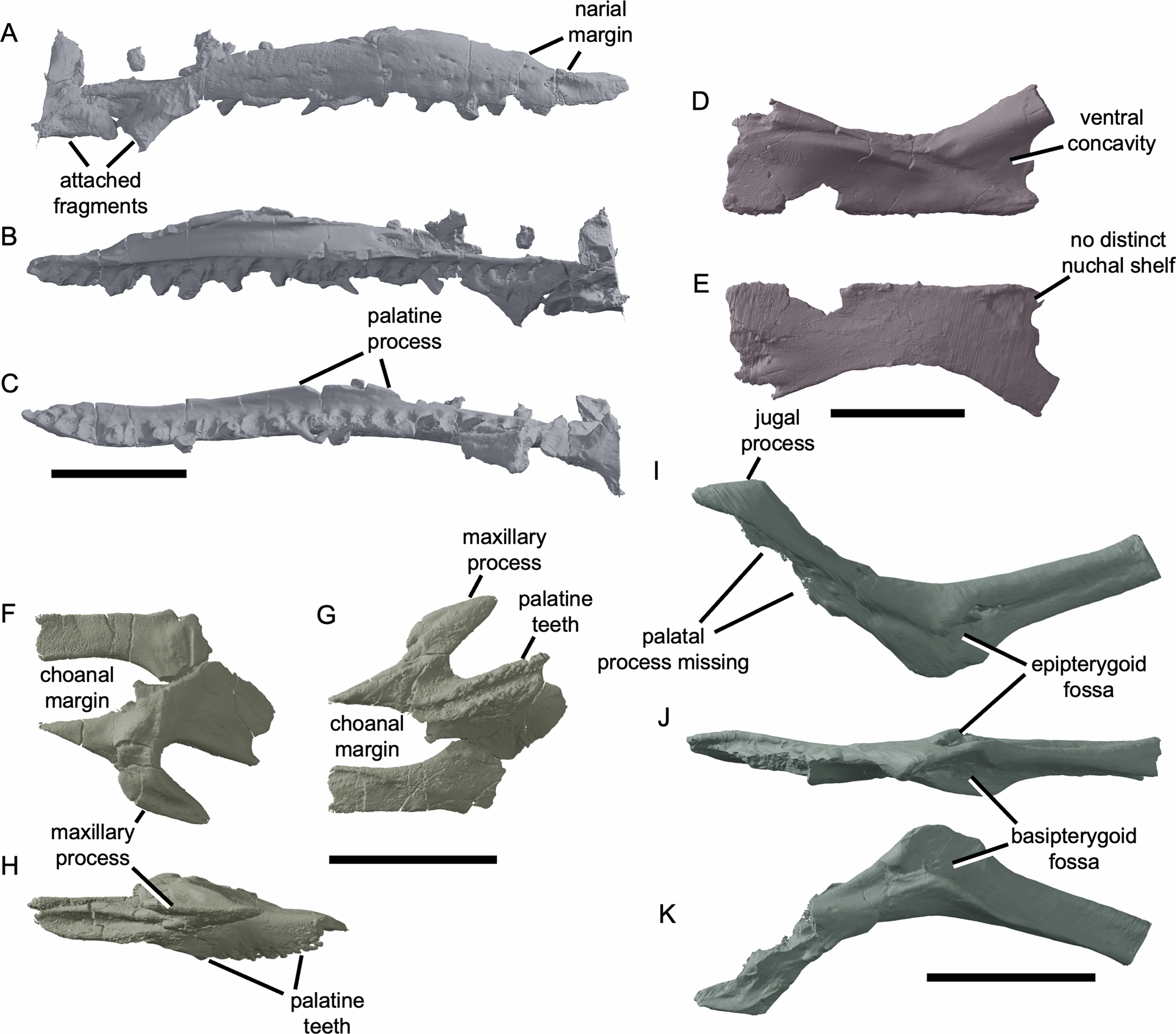
- Select cranial bones of the Parviraptor holotype

Scientific classification
- Kingdom: Animalia
- Phylum: Chordata
- Class: Reptilia
- Family: †Parviraptoridae
- Genus: †Parviraptor; Evans, 1994

Type species
- †Parviraptor estesi Evans, 1994

= Parviraptor =

Parviraptor Temporal range: Bathonian–Berriasian

Genus of extinct reptiles

Parviraptor (lit. 'small robber') is a genus of reptiles in the enigmatic family Parviraptoridae. It contains one species, Parviraptor estesi, known from the Late Jurassic (Tithonian) or Early Cretaceous (Berriasian) Purbeck Limestone Formation of Dorset, England. A second species, Parviraptor gilmorei, was described from the Late Jurassic Morrison Formation of Western North America, but it was subsequently transferred to the separate genus Diablophis. An indeterminate species is known from the Bathonian aged Kirtlington Mammal Bed (Kilmaluag Formation, Scotland).

== Description ==
The shape, length, and body form of Parviraptor is not currently known. Parviraptor was initially described by Susan E. Evans in 1994, based on disarticulated but associated remains including bones of the skull and vertebrae. It was estimated to be about 150 millimetres (5.9 in) in snout-vent length and assigned to the Anguimorpha. Parviraptor was suggested by Caldwell et al. 2015 to be a stem-snake (Ophidia) based on the morphology of its maxilla, and on the claim that the other skeletal remains attributed to the species were not actually attributable to it. However, Susan E. Evans, the original describer of the genus, has stated that subsequent study of the other remains attributed to the genus indicates that they can confidently assigned to Parviraptor, and are dissimilar to the skeletons of snakes, making its affinity to them doubtful.

== Phylogeny ==
Cladogram based in the phylogenetic analysis by Caldwell et al. (2015):

- Ophidia
  - Portugalophis
  - Parviraptor
  - - Eophis
    - - Unnamed sp.
      - Diablophis
  - - Dinilysia
    - - Madtsoiidae
      - - Najash
        - - Coniophis
          - Serpentes (Modern snakes)

In 2025, Benson and colleagues described a new parviraptorid, Breugnathair, known from relatively complete remains. While these authors did not rule out snake affinities for parviraptorids, they proposed other possible placements for the clade, including as stem squamates (in which case they would have convergently evolved their snake-like anatomy) or as early toxicoferans outside of Ophidia.
