= Diablophis =

Diablophis Temporal range: Late Jurassic (Kimmeridgian), 157.3–152.1 Ma

Scientific classification
- Kingdom: Animalia
- Phylum: Chordata
- Class: Reptilia
- Family: †Parviraptoridae
- Genus: †Diablophis; Caldwell et al., 2015

Type species
- †Diablophis gilmorei (Evans, 1996)

Synonyms
- Species synonymy: Parviraptor gilmorei Evans, 1996

Extinct genus of reptiles

Diablophis (lit. 'devil snake') is an extinct genus of reptiles belonging to the enigmatic family Parviraptoridae, known from the Late Jurassic Morrison Formation of North America. The type and only species, D. gilmorei was once thought to be a species of Parviraptor, but it was classified as its own genus in 2015. At this point, the taxon was regarded as a member of the stem snake lineage. Diablophis is known from multiple specimens, the holotype being LACM 4684/140572, which consists of a broken right mandible, broken right maxilla and broken axis vertebrae. A number of other specimens have also been attributed to Diablophis, including LACM 4684/140572 and LACM 5572/120732 (the specimens previously attributed to Parviraptor), and LACM 4684/120472.

In 2025, Benson and colleagues described a new parviraptorid, Breugnathair, known from much more complete remains. While these authors did not rule out snake affinities for parviraptorids, they proposed other possible placements for the clade, including as stem squamates (in which case they would have convergently evolved their snake-like anatomy) or as early toxicoferans outside of Ophidia.

== Phylogeny ==
Diablophis has been recovered as a stem snake, though this placement is disputed. The cladogram from Caldwell et al. (2015) is replicated below.

- - Anguimorph root
  - - - Diablophis
      - Eophis
      - Portugalophis
      - Parviraptor
      - aff. Parviraptor
    - - Dinilysia
      - - - Sanajeh
          - - Yurlunggur
            - Wonambi
        - - Najash
          - - Coniophis
            - - Scolecophidia
              - - Uropeltidae
                - - Anilius
                  - - - Haasiophis
                      - - Eopodophis
                        - Pachyrachis
                    - - - Loxocemus
                        - Xenopeltis
                      - - - Bolyeriidae
                          - - Tropidophiidae
                            - - Acrochordidae
                              - "Basal colubroids"
                        - - Ungaliophiidae
                          - - Erycniae
                            - - - Pythoninae
                                - Boinae
