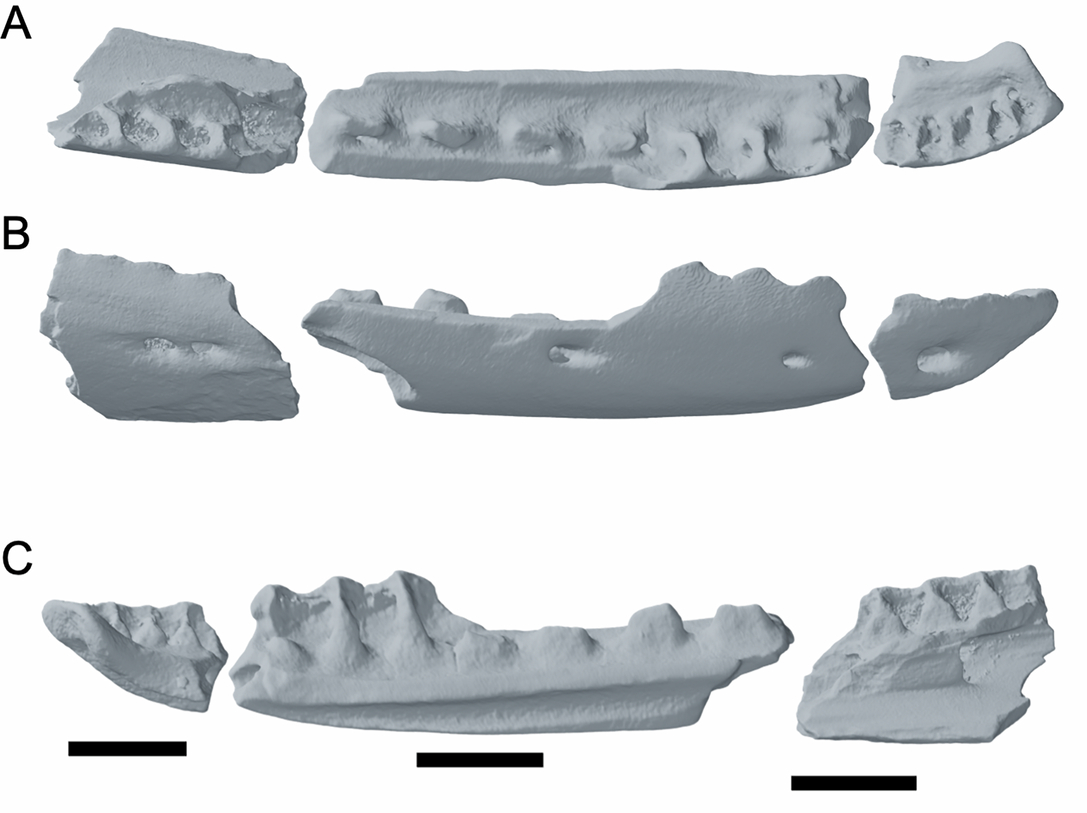
- Syntype dentary fragments of Eophis

Scientific classification
- Kingdom: Animalia
- Phylum: Chordata
- Class: Reptilia
- Family: †Parviraptoridae
- Genus: †Eophis; Caldwell et al. 2015

Type species
- Eophis underwoodi Caldwell et al. 2015

= Eophis =

Eophis Temporal range: Middle Jurassic, Bathonian

Extinct genus of reptiles

Eophis (lit. 'dawn snake') is a potentially dubious genus of reptiles in the enigmatic clade Parviraptoridae, known from the Middle Jurassic (Bathonian) Forest Marble Formation of the United Kingdom. The genus containing a single species, Eophis underwoodi, known from three dentary fragments and a maxilla fragment from Kirtlington Quarry.

Initial interpretations proposed anguimorph lizard affinities, but it was reintepreted as a stem snake by Caldwell et al. (2015), a placement re-affirmed in a subsequent 2017 analysis. In 2025, Benson and colleagues described a new parviraptorid, Breugnathair, known from much more complete remains. While these authors did not rule out snake affinities for parviraptorids, they proposed other possible placements for the clade, including as stem squamates (in which case they would have convergently evolved their snake-like anatomy) or as early toxicoferans outside of Ophidia. These authors were unable to identify distinct traits in the Eophis fossil material, noting that observable differences could be due to immaturity or small size. As such, they regarded it as a nomen dubium and an indeterminate parviraptorid.

== Phylogeny ==
Cladogram based in the phylogenetic analysis by Caldwell et al. (2015):

- Ophidia
  - Portugalophis
  - Parviraptor
  - - Eophis
    - - Unnamed sp.
      - Diablophis
  - - Dinilysia
    - - Madtsoiidae
      - - Najash
        - - Coniophis
          - Serpentes (Modern snakes)
