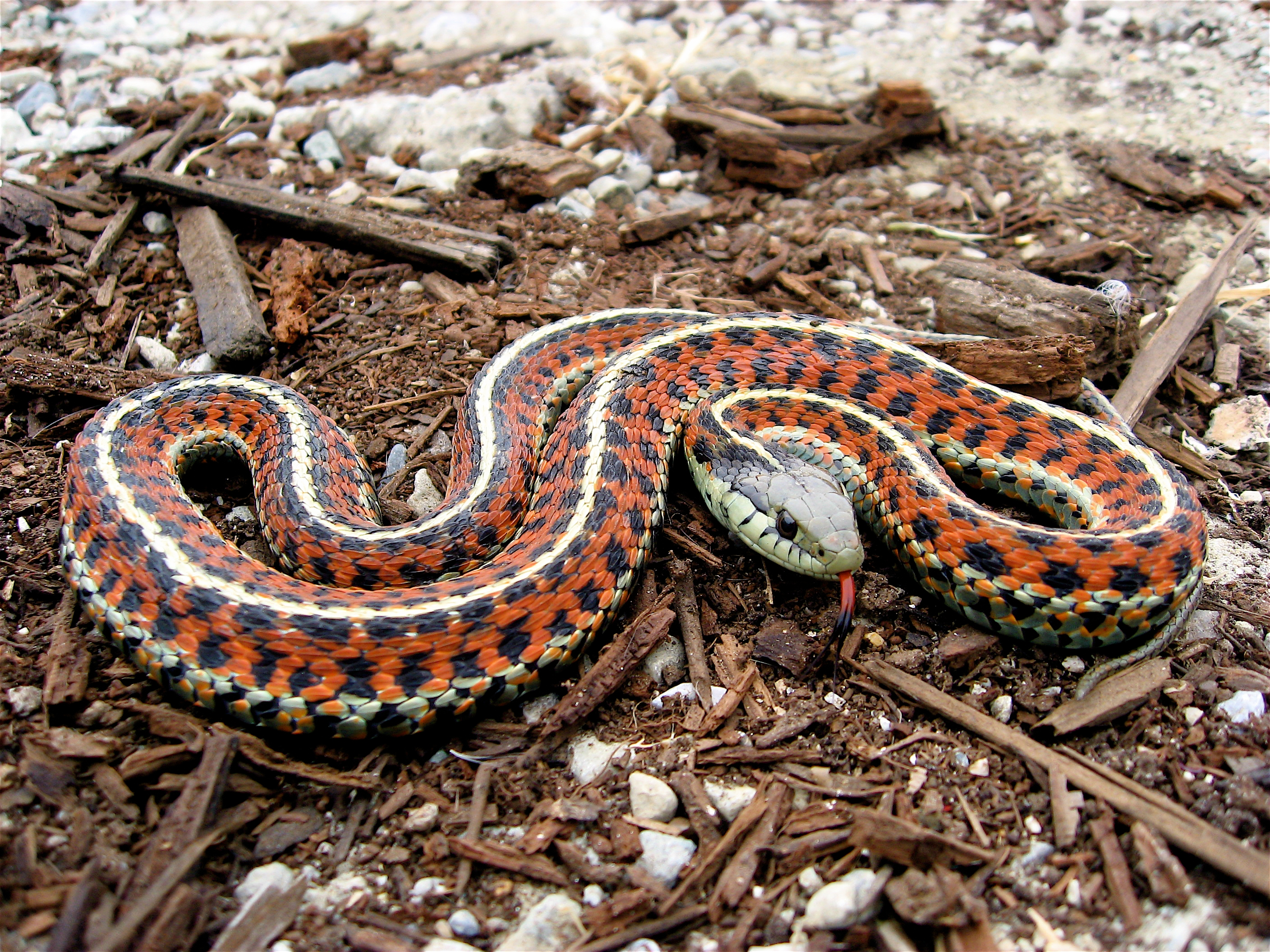
- Coast garter snake, Thamnophis elegans terrestris

Scientific classification
- Kingdom: Animalia
- Phylum: Chordata
- Class: Reptilia
- Order: Squamata
- Clade: Toxicofera
- Clade: Ophidia; Latreille, 1804

Subgroups
- †Coniophis; †Dinilysia; †Eupodophis?; †Lunaophis; †Najash; †Seismophis; †Tametara; †Lapparentophiidae; †Madtsoiidae?; †Parviraptoridae?; Serpentes

= Ophidia =

Ophidians Temporal range: Aptian – Recent, 125–0 Ma Questionable Middle Jurassic records

Group of squamate reptiles

Ophidia /oʊˈfɪdiə/ (also known as Pan-Serpentes) is a group of squamate reptiles including modern snakes and reptiles more closely related to snakes than to other living groups of lizards.

Ophidia was defined as the "most recent common ancestor of Pachyrhachis and Serpentes (modern snakes), and all its descendants" by Lee and Caldwell (1998: 1551).

The clade name Ophidia derives from the Ancient Greek word ὀφίδιον (ophídion), meaning "small snake".

== Evolution ==
Modern snakes are thought to have evolved from either burrowing or aquatic lizards during the mid-Cretaceous period, and the earliest known fossils date to around 112 Ma ago. However, the relationship between modern snake and more primitive snake ancestors, many of which retained hind limbs, is less clear. While many of these "stem-snakes" are known from Mesozoic fossils, some of them may be descendants of the earliest true snakes rather than more primitive lineages. Below is a cladogram modified from a study by Wilson et al. (2010), which found many stem-snakes of other studies to be true snakes instead.

- Serpentes (modern snakes)
  - Scolecophidia
  - Najash rionegrina
  - - Dinilysia patagonica
    - Alethinophidia
      - - Anilius
        - - Cylindrophis
          - - Uropeltinae
            - Anomochilus
      - - Madtsoiidae
        - - Loxocemus
          - Macrostomata

Below is different phylogenetic overview of ophidians, following the study by Caldwell et al. 2015.

- Ophidia
  - Portugalophis
  - Parviraptor
  - - Eophis
    - - Unnamed sp.
      - Diablophis
  - - Dinilysia
    - - Madtsoiidae
      - - Najash
        - - Coniophis
          - Serpentes (modern snakes)

The fossil record of snakes is relatively poor because snake skeletons are typically small and fragile, making fossilization uncommon. Fossils readily identifiable as snakes (though often retaining hind limbs) first appear in the fossil record during the Cretaceous period. The earliest known snake fossils come from sites in Utah and Algeria, represented by the genera Coniophis and Lapparentophis, respectively. These fossil sites have been tentatively dated to the Albian or Cenomanian age of the late Cretaceous, between 112 and 94 Ma ago. However, an even greater age has been suggested for one of the Algerian sites, which may be as old as the Aptian, 125 to 112 Ma ago. Caldwell et al. 2015 described three genera of stem-snakes from Jurassic and considered that Parviraptor as stem-snake as well. However, later review considers that affinity of those fossils as stem-snakes are doubtful, which makes the earliest unequivocal records date around Aptian-Cenomanian. In 2025, Benson and colleagues described a new parviraptorid, Breugnathair, known from relatively complete remains. While these authors did not rule out snake affinities for parviraptorids, they proposed other possible placements for the clade, including as stem squamates (in which case they would have convergently evolved their snake-like anatomy) or as early toxicoferans outside of Ophidia.

Based on comparative anatomy, there is consensus that snakes descended from lizards. Pythons and boas—primitive groups among modern snakes—have vestigial hind limbs: tiny, clawed digits known as anal spurs, which are used to grasp during mating. The Leptotyphlopidae and Typhlopidae groups also possess remnants of the pelvic girdle, sometimes appearing as horny projections when visible.

Front limbs are nonexistent in all known snakes. This is caused by the evolution of Hox genes, controlling limb morphogenesis. The axial skeleton of the snakes' common ancestor, like most other tetrapods, had regional specializations consisting of cervical (neck), thoracic (chest), lumbar (lower back), sacral (pelvic), and caudal (tail) vertebrae. Early in snake evolution, the Hox gene expression in the axial skeleton responsible for the development of the thorax became dominant. As a result, the vertebrae anterior to the hindlimb buds (when present) all have the same thoracic-like identity (except from the atlas, axis, and 1–3 neck vertebrae). In other words, most of a snake's skeleton is an extremely extended thorax. Ribs are found exclusively on the thoracic vertebrae. Neck, lumbar and pelvic vertebrae are very reduced in number (only 2–10 lumbar and pelvic vertebrae are present), while only a short tail remains of the caudal vertebrae. However, the tail is still long enough to be of important use in many species, and is modified in some aquatic and tree-dwelling species.

Modern snakes greatly diversified during the Paleocene. This occurred alongside the adaptive radiation of mammals, following the extinction of (non-avian) dinosaurs. The colubrids, one of the more common snake groups, became particularly diverse due to preying on rodents, an especially successful mammal group.

=== Origins ===
The origin of snakes remains an unresolved issue. There are two main hypotheses competing for acceptance.

==== Burrowing lizard hypothesis ====
There is fossil evidence to suggest that snakes may have evolved from burrowing lizards, such as the varanids (or a similar group) during the Cretaceous Period. An early fossil snake, Najash rionegrina, was a two-legged burrowing animal with a sacrum, and was fully terrestrial. One extant analog of these putative ancestors is the earless monitor Lanthanotus of Borneo (though it also is semiaquatic). Subterranean species evolved bodies streamlined for burrowing, and eventually lost their limbs. According to this hypothesis, features such as the transparent, fused eyelids (brille) and loss of external ears evolved to cope with fossorial difficulties, such as scratched corneas and dirt in the ears. Some primitive snakes are known to have possessed hindlimbs, but their pelvic bones lacked a direct connection to the vertebrae. These include fossil species like Haasiophis, Pachyrhachis and Eupodophis.

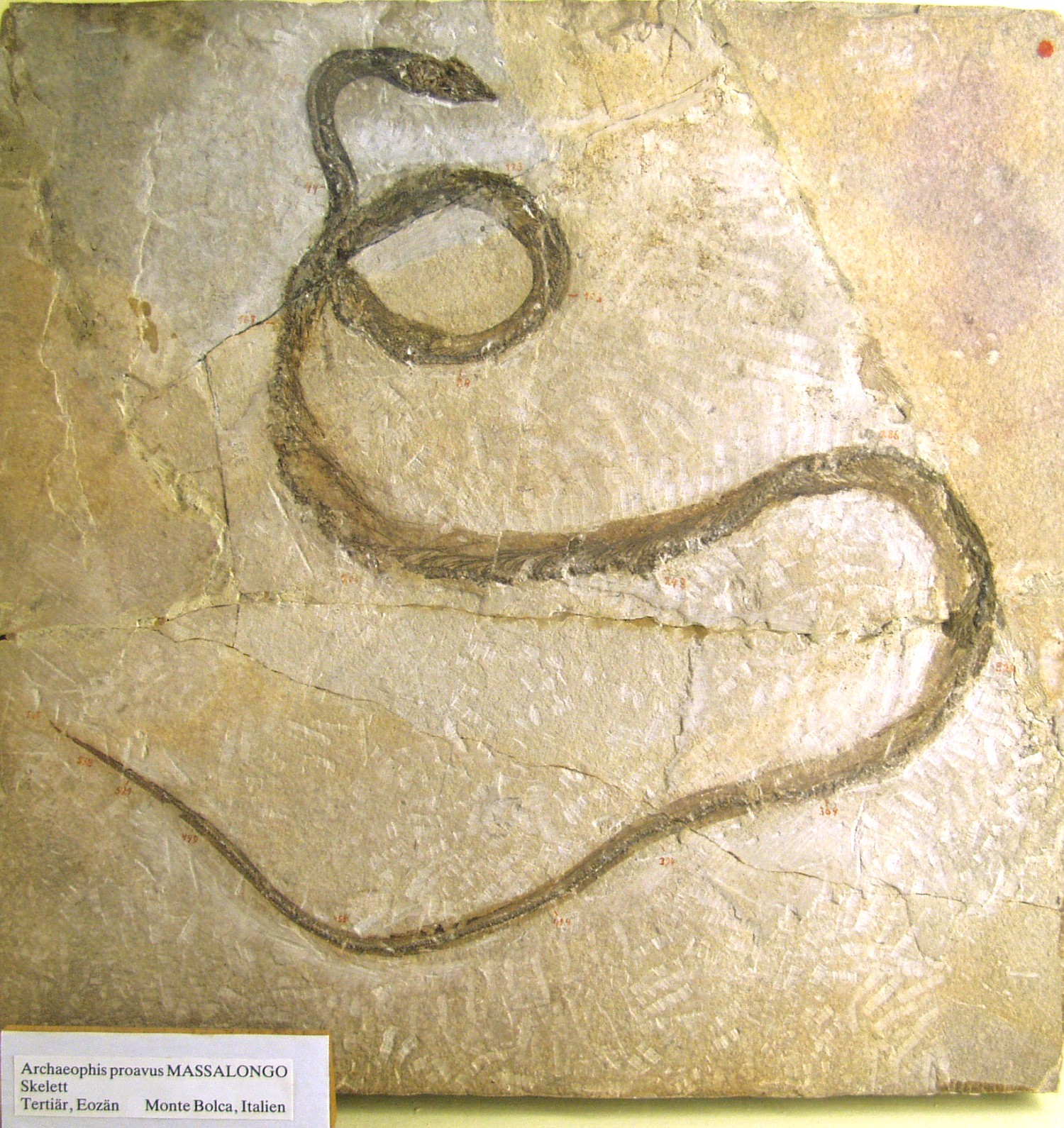
Fossil of Archaeophis proavus.

==== Aquatic lizard hypothesis ====
Many researchers believe that snakes share a common marine ancestry with mosasaurs, a suggestion advanced in 1869 by Edward Drinker Cope, who coined the term Pythonomorpha to unite them. The idea lay dormant for more than a century, to be revived in the 1990s. The mosasaurs were aquatic varanid lizards from the Cretaceous—which in turn are derived from Aigialosaurids. According to this hypothesis, the fused, transparent eyelids of snakes are thought to have evolved to combat marine conditions (corneal water loss through osmosis), and the external ears were lost through disuse in an aquatic environment. This ultimately led to an animal similar to today's sea snakes. In the Late Cretaceous, snakes recolonized land, and continued to diversify into today's snakes. Fossilized snake remains are known from early Late Cretaceous marine sediments, which is consistent with this hypothesis. Similar skull structure, reduced or absent limbs, and other anatomical features found in both mosasaurs and snakes led to a positive cladistical correlation, and some of these features are shared with varanids.

The cladogram below, based on Palci and Caldwell (2010), suggests that snakes are more closely related to Dolichosaurids than mosasaurs proper. placing the Dolichosauridae as a sister group to modern snakes and their closest ancestors.

- Anguimorpha
  - Anguidae
  - - - Xenosaurus
      - Shinisaurus
    - - Heloderma
      - - - Lanthanotus
          - Varanus
        - Pythonomorpha
          - - Aigialosauridae
            - Mosasauridae
          - Ophidiomorpha
            - Dolichosauridae
              - Coniasaurus
              - Dolichosaurus
            - - Pontosaurus
              - - Aphanizocnemus
                - - Adriosaurus
                  - - Acteosaurus
                    - Ophidia
