= Tametara =

Tametara Temporal range: Late Cretaceous (late Santonian–early Campanian), ~85–75 Ma

Scientific classification
- Kingdom: Animalia
- Phylum: Chordata
- Class: Reptilia
- Order: Squamata
- Clade: Ophidia
- Genus: †Tametara; Simões et al., 2026
- Species: †T. mirim

Binomial name
- †Tametara mirim Simões et al., 2026

Genus of extinct snake

Tametara (lit. 'adorned') is an extinct genus of stem snake known from the Late Cretaceous (Santonian–Campanian ages) Adamantina Formation of Brazil. The genus contains a single species, Tametara mirim, known from a partial articulated skull and skeleton. Alongside Dinilysia, Najash, and Sanajeh, Tametara is one of the only Mesozoic snakes known from articulated and three-dimensionally preserved fossils.

== Discovery and naming ==
The Tametara fossil material was discovered in december 2020 by paleontologist William R. Nava and the field assistant Giovanna M. X. Paixão, from the Paleontology Museum of Marília, at the José Martin Suárez paleontological site (William's Quarry 2), which represents outcrops of the Adamantina Formation (Bauru Group). This site is located in Presidente Prudente municipality of São Paulo, Brazil. The specimen is housed in the Museo de Paleontología de Marília, where it is permanently accessioned as specimen MPM 420. It consists of much of an articulated and three-dimensional skeleton, including the rear portion of the skull and mandible and the first 103 vertebrae of the spinal column.

In 2026, Tiago R. Simões and colleagues described Tametara mirim as a new genus and species of early snake based on these fossil remains, establishing MPM 420 as the holotype specimen. The generic name, Tametara, is a Tupí-Guaraní word meaning 'adorned', in reference to the prominent sagittal crest of this taxon. The specific name, mirim, is a Tupí-Guaraní word meaning 'small-sized'.
