= Pelvic spur =

Modified reptilian appendages

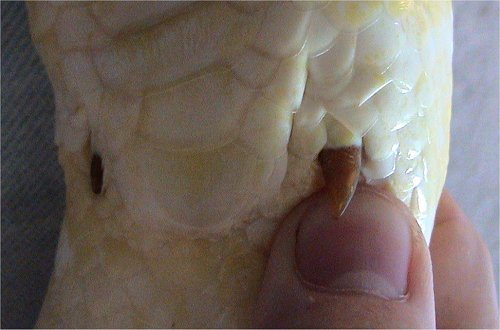
External view of anal spurs on a male, albino Burmese python

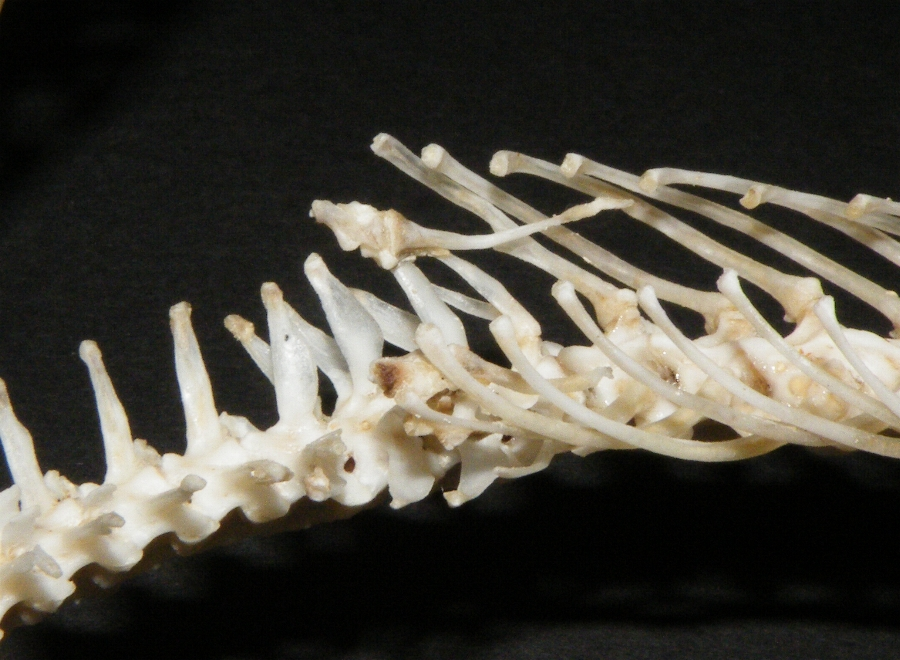
Skeleton of a Boelens python showing the bones inside the anal spurs

Pelvic spurs (also known as vestigial legs) are external protrusions found around the cloaca in certain superfamilies of snakes belonging to the greater infraorder Alethinophidia. These spurs are made up of the remnants of the femur bone, which is then covered by a corneal spur, or claw-like structure. This femur derives from ancestral hind limbs found in the most recent common ancestor of modern snakes and the other reptiles of the clade Toxicofera, many of which have fully functional front and hind limbs. Due to the fact that the spurs derive from the ancestral state of functional legs, but are no longer functional for locomotion specifically, these structures meet the criteria for being considered vestigial. Nonetheless, uses for the structures have been thoroughly documented. Species that have external spurs have corresponding muscles, neurological structures, and vascularization to allow for independent movement. The spurs are more pronounced and visible in male specimens and have been observed in use during courtship behavior. The spurs are specifically used in the clasping and stimulation of females by males during courtship and mating. In certain species, males will also use their spurs to engage in combat with one another.

== Fossil record ==
The fossil record of snakes is not expansive. Nonetheless, multiple fossilized specimens document the progression of the development of leglessness within the suborder Serpentes. The species of extinct snake Najash rionegrina was first described in 2006, and has been proposed as the earliest branching taxa of the suborder Serpentes. The fossils were found in the Patagonia region of Argentina, and were dated to the Upper Cretaceous period. Najash rionegrina exhibited a sacrum, pelvic girdle, and robust hind limb structures outside of the ribcage, all of which led researchers to the conclusion that these hind limbs were functional for locomotion. The significance of this finding is great, as there were three other known species of legged snakes from this time period, Pachyrhachis problematicus, Haasiophis terrasanctus and Eupodophis descouensi, but all were predicted to have been marine species, and all of them lacked the sacrum region found in N. rionegrina. The paleontologists thus concluded via phylogenetic analysis that N. rionegrina is the most ancient taxa within Serpentes, and the three extinct species previously described were more closely related to modern-day snakes belonging to Alethinophidia.

Recent analysis of numerous fossil records supported these findings and further demonstrated the reduction of pelvic and hind limb structures within these lineages. Further evidence for these structures being plesiomorphic of can be found in the pelvis of some living taxa such as Candoia carinata or Eunectes murinus. These taxa possess a triradiate pelvis, which can also be observed in the skeletons of modern lizards.

== Distribution ==
The presence of pelvic spurs in extant species of Serpentes is limited. Most members of Scolecophidia do not possess spurs, nor do members of the most populous group within Alethinophidia, the Caenophidia. However, spurs are present among the basal clades of Alethinophidia, including in Booidea and Pythonoidea, among Amerophidia, and among one member of Uropeltoidea, the Cylindrophiidae. These basal clades are sometimes referred to as primitive snakes, as they are considered to be the earliest diverging taxa of Alethinophidia, the clade which includes the majority of described living snake species. The presence and use of spurs across Booidea and Pythonoidea is well documented - in these superfamilies, spurs can be observed as tools for courtship and competition between males, and are sexually dimorphic.

While these are the most well-known taxa to possess spurs, evidence does exist for the presence of ossified vestigial structures in other taxa. A 2019 publication provided evidence for similarly ossified structures in the species Liotyphlops beui of the infraorder Scolecophidia. Members of this sister group of Scolecophidia are poorly understood due to their cryptic nature and are typically small in size, fossorial, and worm-like. This 2019 study is the first described occurrence of these structures within the family Anomalepididae, which is one of three families within Scolecophidia.

== Importance to social behavior ==
Numerous studies have been conducted on the use of pelvic spurs by males in the superfamilies Booidea and Pythonoidea. The sexually dimorphic nature of the spurs was formally described by William H. Stickel and Luccille F. Stickel in 1946 in the genus Enygrus (more commonly known today as Candoia). The authors of this study noted that others in the field had made similar observations before, but had not formally researched the topic specifically. Spurs were found to be significantly larger in males, while in females spurs were much shorter, and were sometimes externally absent.

=== Dominance displays ===
Research has since found the use of pelvic spurs in dominance displays in numerous species. The use of spurs alongside biting was observed in displays between males in a captive group of Indian pythons (Python molurus), which subsequently formed a linear dominance hierarchy. The position in this hierarchy was directly correlated with a male’s number of successful instances of mating. Another study found the use of spurs in madagascan boas (Sanzinia madagascariensis), an arboreal species. In this species, researchers did not observe biting. In fact, the authors observed that the heads of combating males were frequently out of sight of one another. In its place, observed males would tightly grip on to each other using the posterior regions of their bodies, orienting their spurs to be perpendicular to their body while doing so. The authors postulate that this form of spur-based combat is adaptive to the species’ arboreal habitat. It is also worth noting that combat between males in species that lack spurs, such as species of Caenophidia, relies on a distinct repertoire of behaviors that differs from species possessing spurs.

=== Courtship behaviors ===
Similar to the described observations of sexual dimorphism prior to their publication, William H. Stickel and Luccille F. Stickel also noted that observations had been made by others of pelvic spur use by males on females during mating. These observations have since been formally investigated and published in multiple species.

One such study found dynamic use of spurs by males during different phases of courtship and mating in Burmese pythons (Python molurus bivittatus), with anterior to posterior spur movements varying in speed of undulation by phase. Furthermore, the males exhibited use of the spurs to better position or adjust the female’s cloaca for mating. The authors note that spur use for combat can also be observed in this species between males. A separate study found similar results in diamond pythons (Morelia spilota), a species that does not exhibit any bouts of combat between males. In this species, multiple males were observed mating with the same female simultaneously, and males did not engage in combat. Instead, it was observed that spurs were used by males to manipulate the tail of the female. Corroborating these results in a New World species, a study in 2023 documented the use of spurs in mating by red-tailed boas, Boa constrictor. It was observed that males repeatedly alternated the orientation of the spurs between horizontal and vertical positions, which the authors suggest stimulated muscle contractions in the female, which would allow for better alignment between the individuals for mating.
