= Pouitella =

Pouitella Temporal range: Late Cretaceous, Cenomanian

Scientific classification
- Domain: Eukaryota
- Kingdom: Animalia
- Phylum: Chordata
- Class: Reptilia
- Order: Squamata
- Family: †Lapparentophiidae
- Genus: †Pouitella; Rage, 1988
- Species: †P. pervetus

Binomial name
- †Pouitella pervetus Rage, 1988

Extinct genus of reptiles

Pouitella is an extinct genus of terrestrial ophidian known from the Cenomanian of Brézé and Lussant, France and was first described by J-C. Rage in 1988. Only the type species, P. pervetus is known and the holotype (Univ. Paris-VI, no. BRZ 1) consists only of middle trunk vertebrae.

Pouitella was probably the sister taxon of the slightly older Lapparentophis from the ?Albian-Cenomanian of Algeria, Morocco and Sudan. Pouitella was initially believed to have been a snake, but later studies have found it to fall under Ophidia, the clade which Serpentes also belongs to.
