= Parviraptoridae =

Parviraptorids Temporal range: Middle Jurassic–Early Cretaceous (Bathonian–Berriasian)

Scientific classification
- Kingdom: Animalia
- Phylum: Chordata
- Class: Reptilia
- Superorder: Lepidosauria
- Clade: Pan-Squamata
- Clade: incertae sedis
- Family: †Parviraptoridae; Benson et al., 2025

Type genus
- †Parviraptor Evans, 1994

Genera
- †Breugnathair; †Diablophis; †Eophis; †Parviraptor; †Portugalophis

Family of extinct squamates

Parviraptoridae is an extinct family of enigmatic total group squamate reptiles, known from the Middle Jurassic (Bathonian age) to Early Cretaceous (Berriasian age) of Europe and North America. Members of this clade are characterized by an unusual set of conflicting anatomical traits that are comparable in some ways to snakes and varanids within the Toxicofera, while also bearing several characters unlike all modern squamate groups.

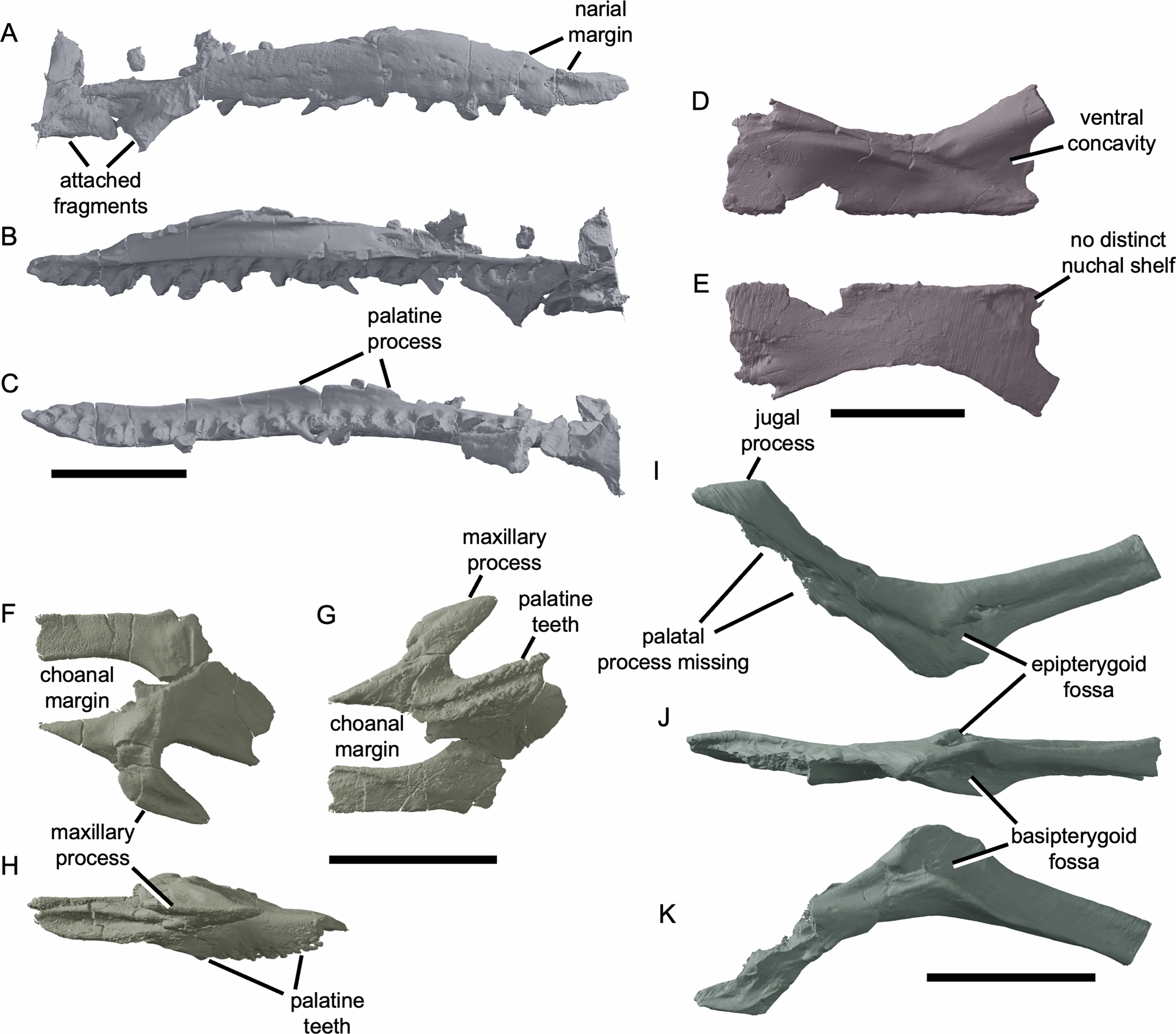
Renderings of several Parviraptor holotype skull bones

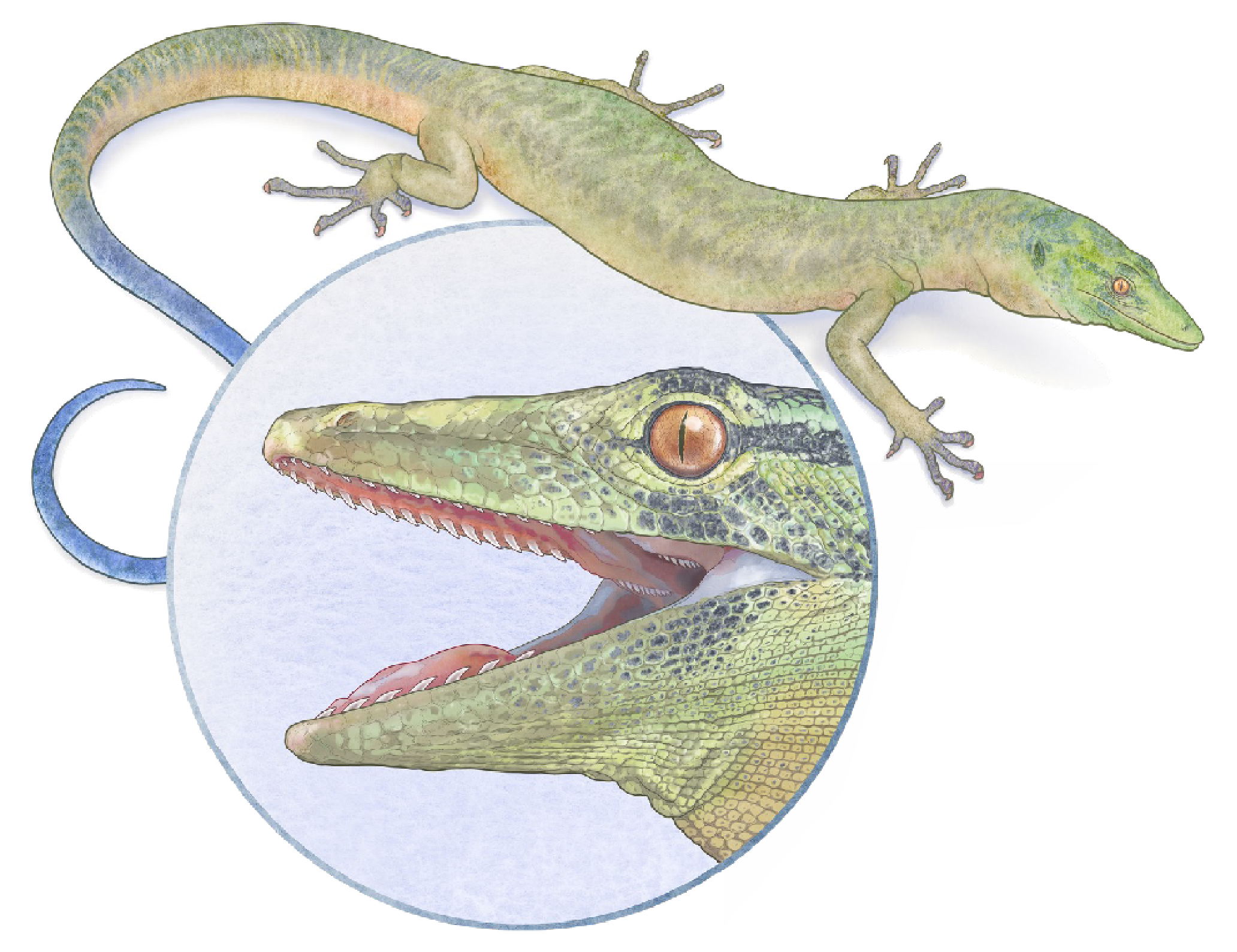
Speculative life restoration of Breugnathair

== Classification ==
Using different datasets and constraints, Benson and colleagues (2025) found three potential placements for Parviraptoridae within the Lepidosauria (clade containing tuatara, lizards, and snakes): either in a basal position in the squamate stem group (Pan-Squamata; P1), or within the derived clade Toxicofera, as an independent branch (P2) or part of the snake stem group (Ophidia; P3). These alternate placements are summarized in the simplified cladogram below:

- Lepidosauria
  - Rhynchocephalia
  - Pan-Squamata
    - Parviraptoridae (P1)
    - Squamata (crown group)
      - Gekkota
      - - ⇑
        - 'other squamates'
        - ⇓
        - Toxicofera
          - Iguania
          - - Parviraptoridae (P2)
            - - Anguimorpha
              - - Parviraptoridae (P3)
                - - Serpentes
