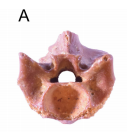
- MHNM.KK387, the holotype of L. ragei

Scientific classification
- Domain: Eukaryota
- Kingdom: Animalia
- Phylum: Chordata
- Class: Reptilia
- Order: Squamata
- Family: †Lapparentophiidae
- Genus: †Lapparentophis; Hoffstetter, 1959

Type species
- †Lapparentophis defrennei Hoffstetter, 1959

Other species
- †L. ragei Vullo, 2019

= Lapparentophis =

Lapparentophis Temporal range: Early-Late Cretaceous, ?Albian–Cenomanian

Extinct genus of reptiles

Lapparentophis (meaning "Lapparent's snake") is an extinct genus of terrestrial ophidian known from the Kem Kem Beds of Northwestern Africa (Algeria, Morocco & Sudan) that was first described by Robert Hoffstetter in 1959. Two species are known: the type species, L. defrennei from Algeria, and a second species, L. ragei from Morocco, which is only known from the holotype MHNM.KK387 and the paratype MHNM.KK388, two isolated trunk vertebrae.

Lapparentophis is probably the sister taxon of the slightly younger Pouitella from the Cenomanian of France. Lapparentophis was initially believed to have been a snake, but later studies have found it to fall under Ophidia, the clade which Serpentes also belongs to.
