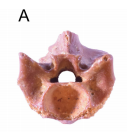
- MHNM.KK387, the holotype of Lapparentophis ragei

Scientific classification
- Domain: Eukaryota
- Kingdom: Animalia
- Phylum: Chordata
- Class: Reptilia
- Order: Squamata
- Clade: Ophidia
- Family: †Lapparentophiidae; Hoffstetter, 1959

Genera
- †Lapparentophis Hoffstetter, 1959; †Pouitella Rage, 1988

= Lapparentophiidae =

Lapparentophiidae Temporal range: Early-Late Cretaceous, ?Albian–Cenomanian

Extinct family of reptiles

Lapparentophiidae (meaning "Lapparent's snakes") are an extinct family of basal terrestrial ophidians known from Early-Late Cretaceous (?Albian-Cenomanian)-aged fossil remains discovered in Algeria, France, Morocco and Sudan. Two genera are known: the type species, Lapparentophis and the poorly represented genus Pouitella.

They were initially believed to have been snakes, but later studied have found Lapparentophiidae to fall under Ophidia, the clade which Serpentes also belongs to.
