= Portugalophis =

Portugalophis Temporal range: Late Jurassic, Kimmeridgian

Scientific classification
- Kingdom: Animalia
- Phylum: Chordata
- Class: Reptilia
- Superorder: Lepidosauria
- Clade: Pan-Squamata
- Clade: incertae sedis
- Family: †Parviraptoridae
- Genus: †Portugalophis; Caldwell et al., 2015
- Species: †P. lignites

Binomial name
- †Portugalophis lignites Caldwell et al., 2015

Genus of extinct squamates

Portugalophis (lit. 'Portugal snake') is an extinct genus of squamate reptiles, known from coal beds in Portugal dated to the Late Jurassic (Kimmeridgian age). The genus contains a single species, Portugalophis lignites, known from two maxillae and a dentary. When it was first described in 2015, Portugalophis was identified as part of the snake stem-group. However, later research has provided a more nuanced interpretation; as a member of the enigmatic family Parviraptoridae, it was characterized by an unusual set conflicting anatomical traits comparable in some ways to snakes and varanids within the Toxicofera, while also bearing several characters unlike all modern squamate groups.
