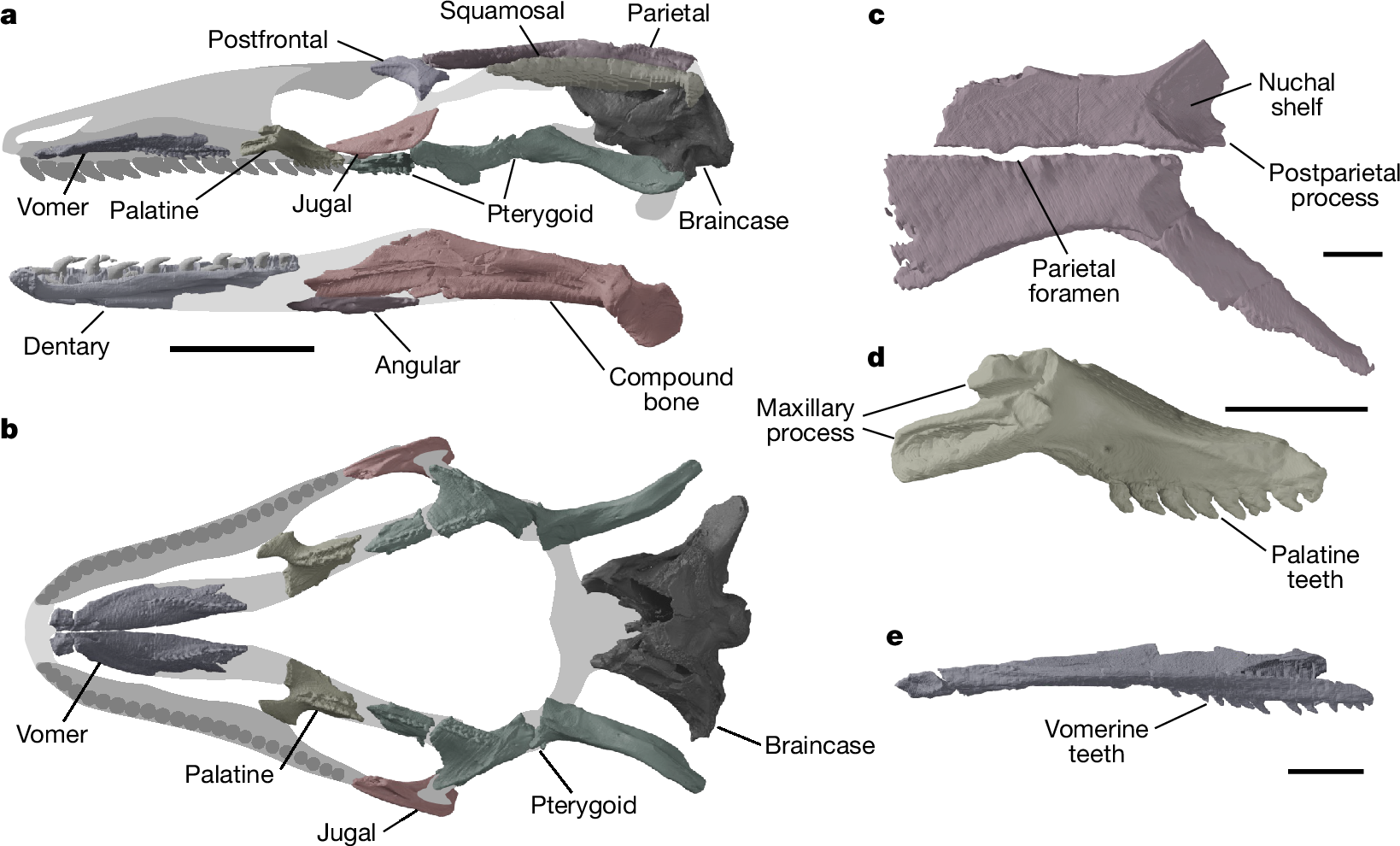
- Holotype skull of Breugnathair

Scientific classification
- Kingdom: Animalia
- Phylum: Chordata
- Class: Reptilia
- Superorder: Lepidosauria
- Clade: Pan-Squamata
- Clade: incertae sedis
- Family: †Parviraptoridae
- Genus: †Breugnathair; Benson et al., 2025
- Species: †B. elgolensis

Binomial name
- †Breugnathair elgolensis Benson et al., 2025

= Breugnathair =

Breugnathair Temporal range: Middle Jurassic (Bathonian), 166 Ma

Genus of extinct squamate

Breugnathair (meaning "false snake") is an extinct genus of squamate reptile, known from the Middle Jurassic (Bathonian age) Kilmaluag Formation of Scotland. The genus contains a single species, Breugnathair elgolensis, known from a disarticulated partial skeleton including skull bones. Breugnathair is identified as a member of the enigmatic family Parviraptoridae; members of this clade are characterized by an unusual set of conflicting anatomical traits comparable in some ways to snakes and varanids within the Toxicofera, while also bearing several characters unlike all modern squamate groups.

== Discovery and naming ==
The Breugnathair holotype specimen, NMS G.2023.7.1, was discovered in 2015 by Stig A. Walsh in outcrops of the Kilmaluag Formation north of the village of Elgol on the Isle of Skye (Strathaird Peninsula), Scotland. The specimen comprises various disarticulated remains of a single individual spread over about 19 centimetres (7.5 in) in a limestone slab. Identified bones include forelimb and hindlimb bones, pectoral and pelvic girdle elements, neck, back, and tail vertebrae, ribs, and cranium and mandible elements.

In 2025, Roger B. J. Benson and colleagues described Breugnathair elgolensis as a new genus and species of squamates based on these fossil remains. The generic name, Breugnathair, is adapted from the Scottish Gaelic breug-nathair (Scottish Gaelic pronunciation: [brʲiag nahɪrʲ]) meaning "false snake". The specific name, elgolensis, references the discovery of the specimen near Elgol.

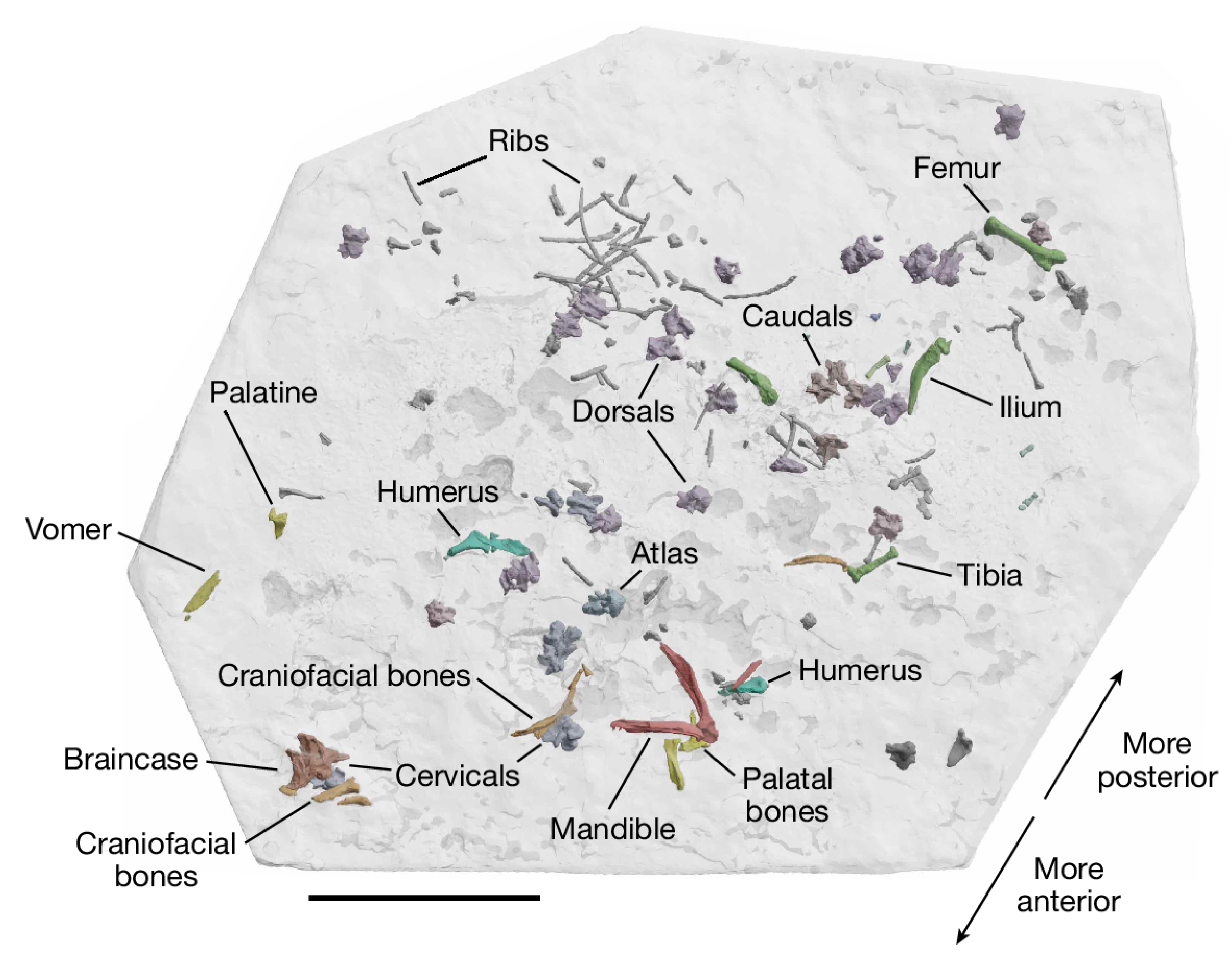
Rendering of the holotype specimen using CT scans

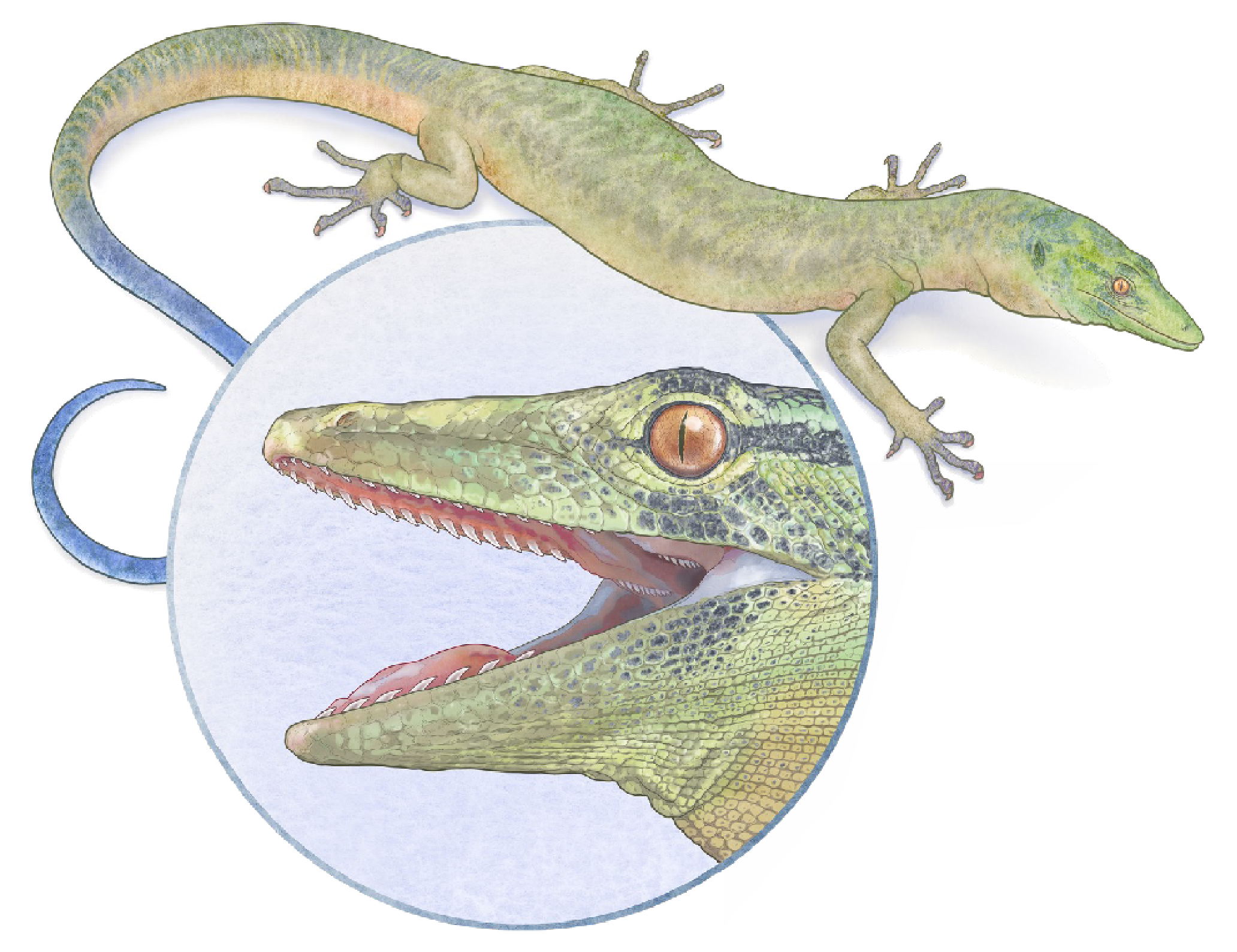
Speculative life restoration of Breugnathair
