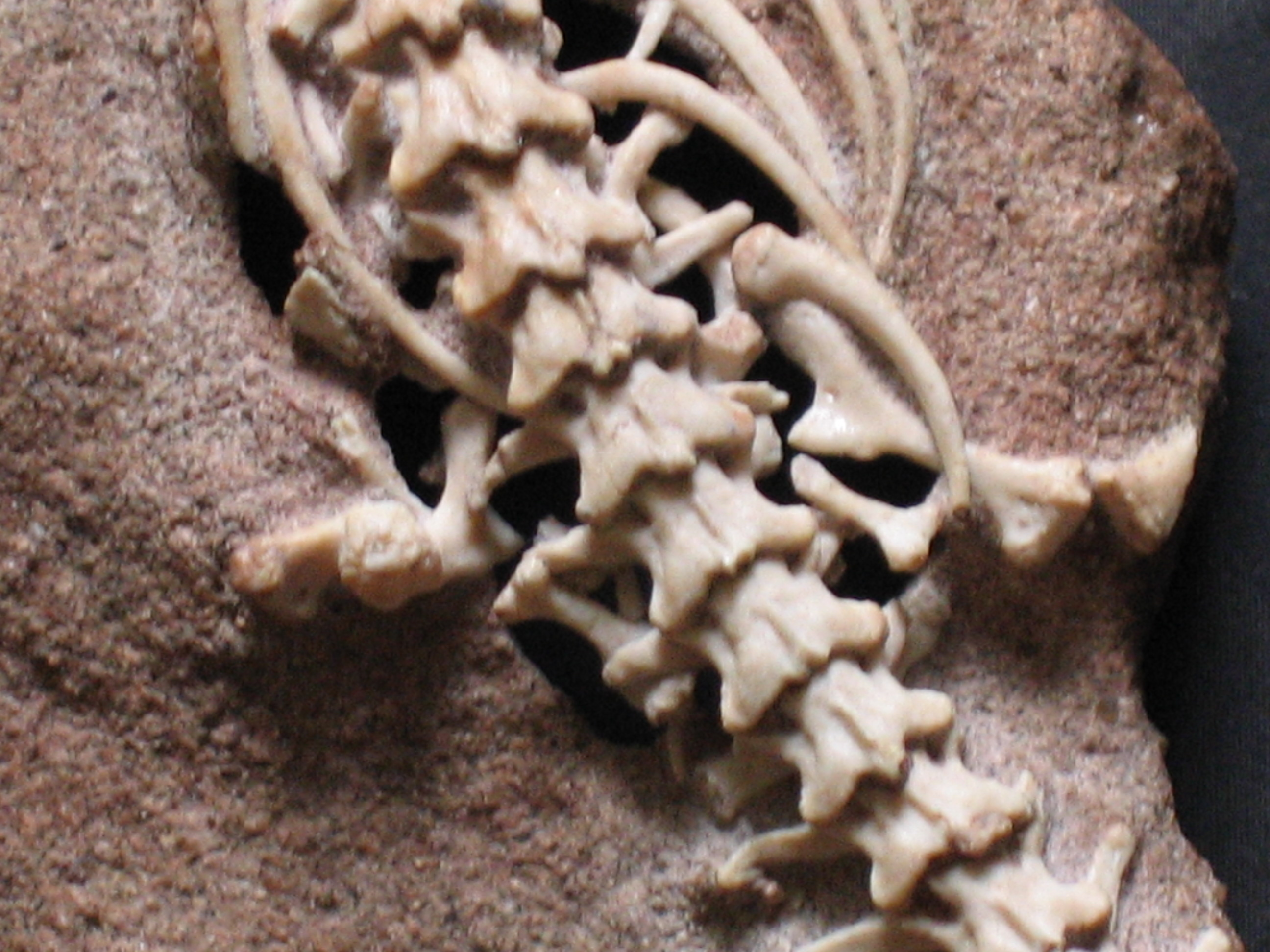
- Sacral region of the holotype of the “legged snake” Najash rionegrina

Scientific classification
- Kingdom: Animalia
- Phylum: Chordata
- Class: Reptilia
- Order: Squamata
- Clade: Ophidia
- Genus: †Najash; Apesteguía & Zaher, 2006

Type species
- Najash rionegrina Apesteguía & Zaher, 2006

= Najash =

Najash Temporal range: Albian, ~111–106 Ma

Extinct genus of snakes

Najash is an extinct genus of basal snake from the Early Cretaceous (Albian) Candeleros Formation of Patagonia. Like a number of other Cretaceous and living snakes it retained hindlimbs, but Najash is unusual in having well-developed legs that extend outside the rib cage, and a pelvis connected to the spine.

== Discovery and description ==
Fossils of Najash were found in the terrestrial Candeleros Formation, in Rio Negro Province, Argentina. The skull and spine of Najash show primitive features that resemble other Cretaceous snakes, such as Dinilysia patagonica and Madtsoiidae. Also, several characteristics of the neck and tail of Najash and Dinilysia patagonica show how the body plan of snakes evolved from a lizard-like ancestor.

Najash had not lost its sacrum, the pelvic bone composed of several fused vertebrae, nor its pelvic girdle, which are absent in modern snakes, and in all other known fossil snakes as well. Nearly all phylogenetic analyses place Najash as an early offshoot of the snake tree, outside of all living snakes.

== Ecology ==
The cranial morphology of Najash suggests that it had only limited unilateral movements of the mandibles, and lacked the attributes of macrostomatan snakes to ingest large prey, Apesteguía suggests, presumably based on the associated fauna, that this snake preyed on a variety of small vertebrates, such as ‘lizards’, micro-mammals and dinosaur hatchlings. This assumption is well supported by the snake body size.
