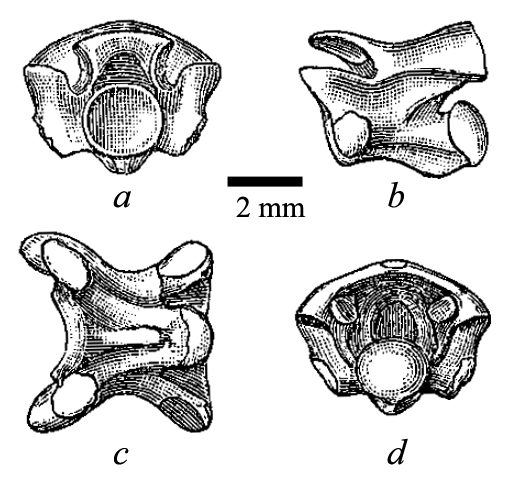
- Holotype vertebra of C. precedens

Scientific classification
- Kingdom: Animalia
- Phylum: Chordata
- Class: Reptilia
- Order: Squamata
- Suborder: Serpentes
- Infraorder: Alethinophidia
- Genus: †Coniophis; Marsh, 1892

Species
- Coniophis carinatus Hecht, 1959; Coniophis cosgriffi Armstrong-Ziegler, 1978; Coniophis dabiebus Rage & Werner, 1999; Coniophis platycarinatus Hecht, 1959; Coniophis precedens Marsh, 1892

= Coniophis =

Coniophis Temporal range: Turonian-Priabonian ~94–34 Ma

Extinct genus of snakes

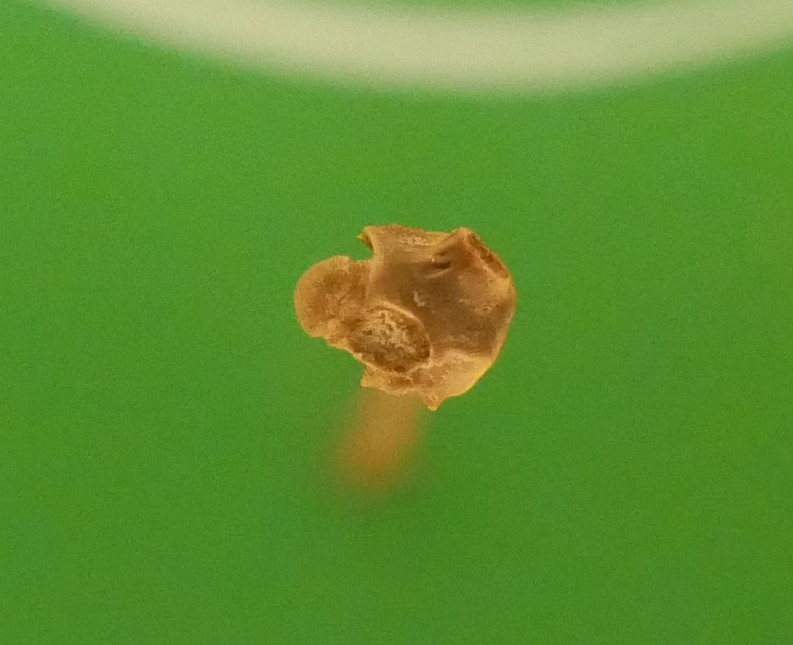
Coniophis sp. vertebra

Coniophis is an extinct genus of snakes with fossils reported from the Cretaceous and Paleogene periods, spanning the K-Pg boundary. The type species is Coniophis precedes, described in 1892 by Othniel Charles Marsh based on a vertebra from the Laramie Formation of Wyoming, United States. A number of other species of the genus Coniophis, have been described. Their affiliation is, however, poorly secured, mostly based on vertebral descriptions from only a few fossils.

== Fossil distribution ==
The genus Coniophis has been regarded as a wastebasket taxon, and the monophyly of its species has been questioned. Regardless, fossils of Coniophis have been described from the following localities:

Cretaceous

- Milk River and Frenchman Formations, Canada (Alberta, Saskatchewan)
- Intertrappean Beds, India
- Wadi Milk Formation, Sudan
- United States
  - Hell Creek Formation, Montana
  - Fruitland Formation, New Mexico
  - Naturita, Cedar Mountain, Straight Cliffs, Kaiparowits and Wahweap Formations, Utah
  - Lance Formation, Wyoming

Paleocene

- Santa Lucía Formation (Tiupampan), Bolivia
- Jbel Guersif Formation, Morocco
- Fort Union Formation, Montana, United States

Eocene

- Itaboraí Formation, Brazil
- France
- Aït Ouarhitane Formation, Morocco
- United States
  - Chadron Formation, North Dakota
  - Bridger, Wagon Bed and Wasatch Formations, Wyoming
