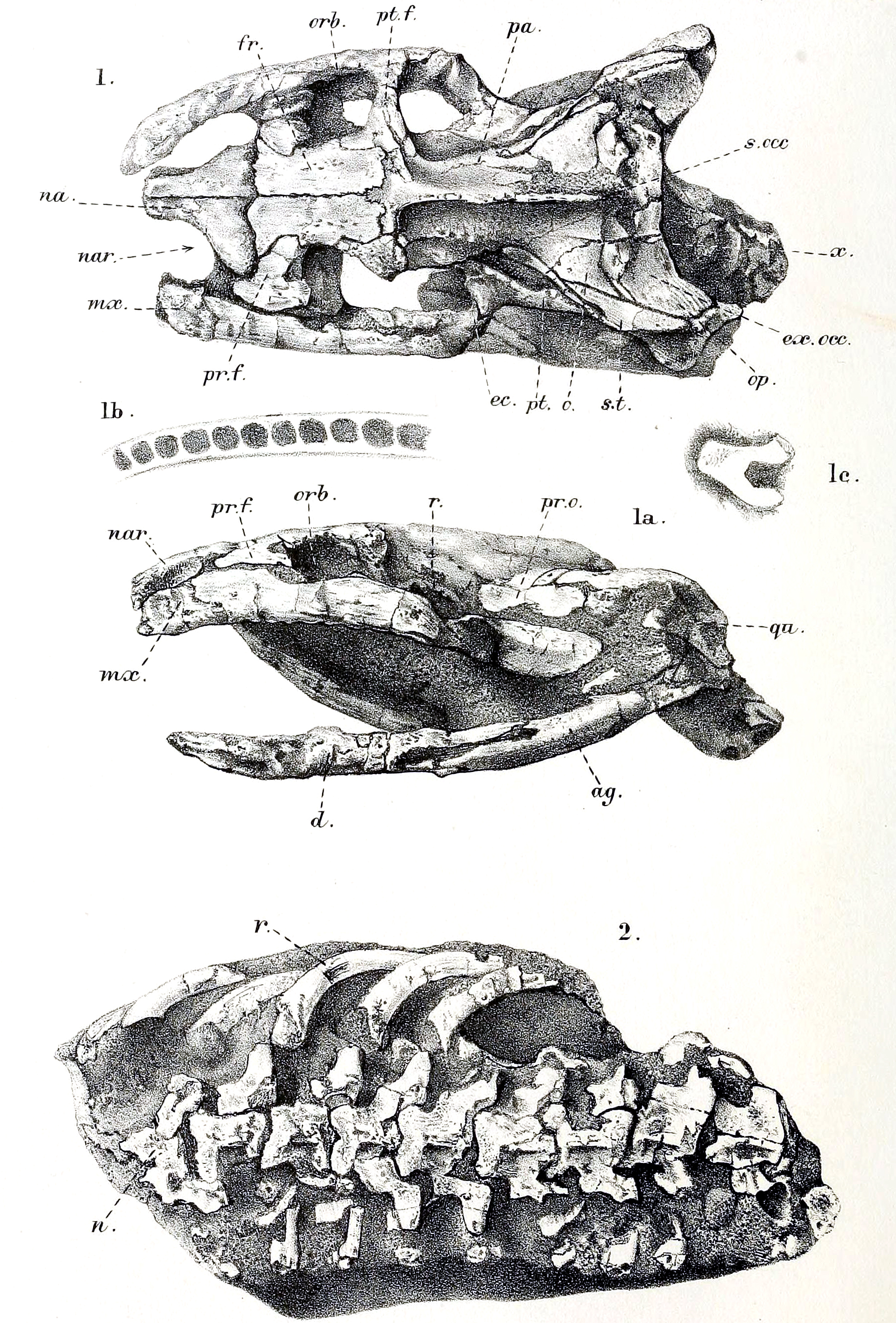
- Illustration of the skull and vertebral column

Scientific classification
- Kingdom: Animalia
- Phylum: Chordata
- Class: Reptilia
- Order: Squamata
- Clade: Ophidia
- Family: †Dinilysiidae
- Genus: †Dinilysia; Woodward, 1901

Type species
- Dinilysia patagonica Woodward, 1901

= Dinilysia =

Dinilysia Temporal range: Late Cretaceous, 85 Ma

Extinct genus of snakes

Dinilysia (meaning "terrible ilysia") is an extinct genus of snake from the Late Cretaceous (Coniacian) of South America. Dinilysia was a relatively large ambush predator, measuring approximately 2 m (6.6 ft) long. The skull morphology of Dinilysia is similar to boids, suggesting that it was able to consume large prey., Living in a desert-like environment, Dinilysia is likely a terrestrial or a semi-fossorial animal.

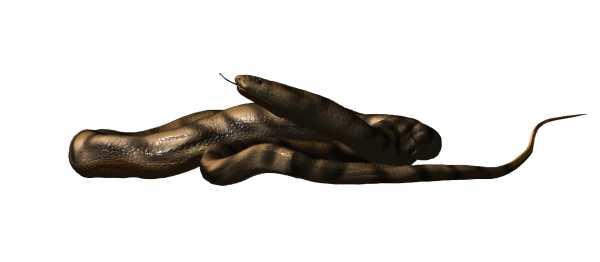
Hypothetical appearance of Dinilysia patagonica (reconstruction based on skeletal and other features).

== Physiology and lineage ==
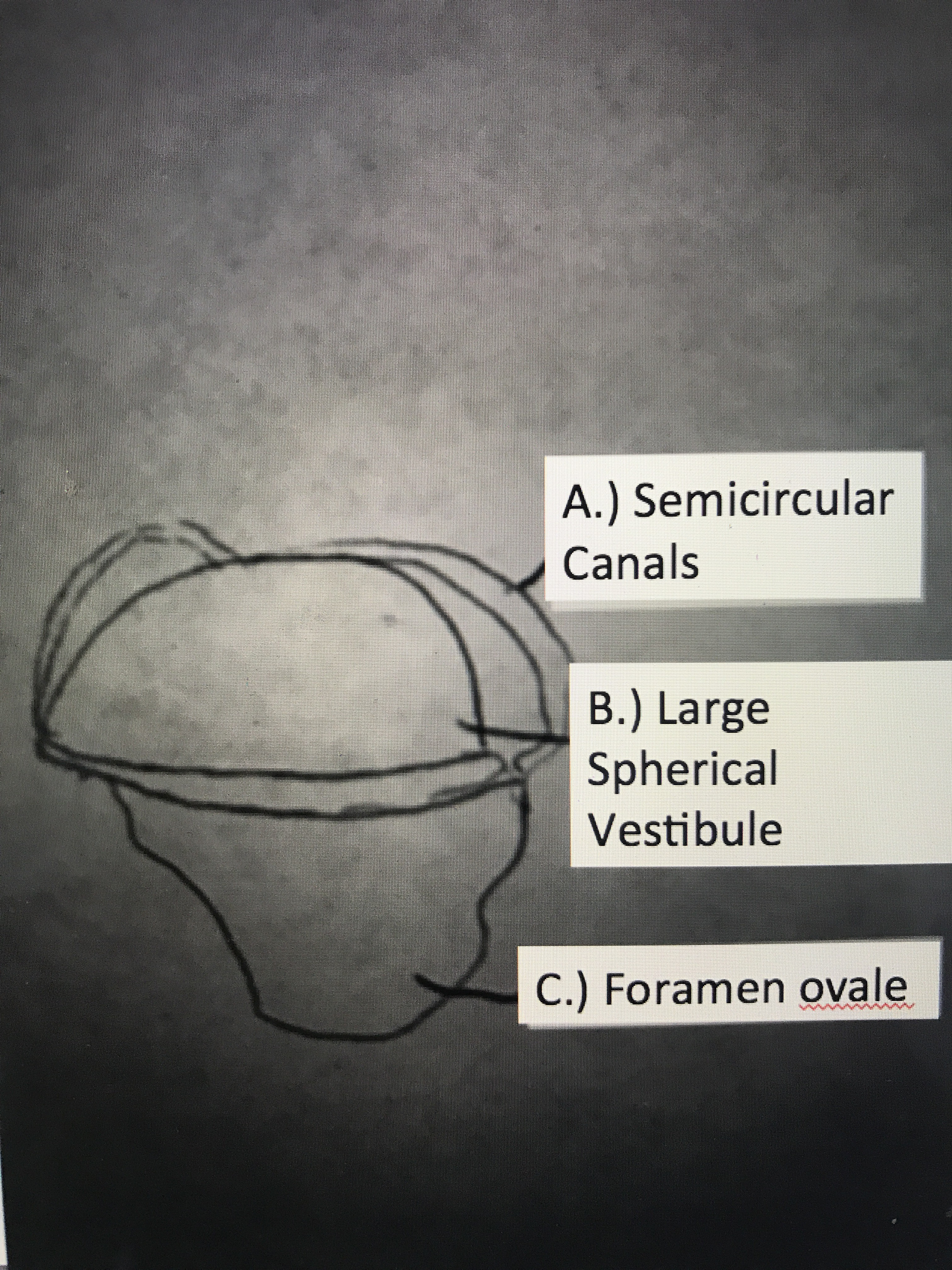
Bony inner ear labyrinth of Dinilysia patagonica

The Dinilysia patagonica is a stem snake that is very closely related to the original ancestor of the clade of crown snakes. Once the fossil of the snake was discovered, an x-ray computed tomography was used to build a digitized endocast of its inner ear. The results displayed that the Dinilysia patagonica's inner ear anatomy had three main parts. It had a large spherical vestibule, large foramen ovale, and slender semicircular canals in its inner ear.

Especially significantly, the spherical vestibule is an inner ear organ that is a morphological signature of burrowing snakes. A large spherical vestibule does not exist in aquatic or generalist (both land and water) snakes, only in snake species that burrow. A spherical vestibule contains a large saccular otolith, which transmits vibrations to the snake's brain. Due to a spherical vestibule, the Dinilysia patagonica was a species especially sensitive to low-frequency ground vibrations rather than airborne frequencies.

The surmounting evidence displays that Dinilysia patagonica was more than likely a terrestrial burrower from the Cretaceous era. This discovery also extends its evidence to the fact that a burrowing habit predates the lineages of modern snakes. These ancestral snakes detected predators and captured prey specifically using low-frequency ground vibrations.

== Theories of origin ==
Dinilysia patagonica is one of the best known Cretaceous, terrestrial-snakes, native to the Late Cretaceous Anacleto Formation and Bajo de la Carpa Formation of the Neuquen province, Argentina. The Dinilysia specimen has twenty-four mid-posterior trunk vertebrates. Dinilysia is referred to as such due to a variety of morphological features. The degree of knowledge represents the most valuable records of snakes from the Upper Cretaceous of Gondwana. Recently, Dinilysia has been labeled a sister group of all living alethinophidia. Therefore this Cretaceous snake still contributes a significant amount within the debate on the origin of snakes and phylogeny. In terms of the locality and age of the Dinilysia the fossils can typically be found in abundance in sandstone sediments favored to the Anacleto formation. Additionally, the overall morphological similarities between that of D. patagonica has been used to determine the phylogeny and possible relations of the characteristics which other more present snakes may share. The articulate snake vertebrate fossils were found and studied in terms of the trunks and vertebral morphological variation has allowed for the deduction of that UNC-CIP 1 can be identified in the Dinilysia genus.

Additionally, the ongoing debate of whether snakes evolved on land or in the ocean; certain pieces of evidence point towards oceanic origin based on possible close relationships between snakes and mosasaurs. However, further evidence shows that terrestrial origin is quite possible because of the structure similarities between the inner ear of the Dinilysia and similar burrowing squamate snakes. Based on both the evolutionary and morphological features and similarities that D. patagonica possess, evidence can be drawn from the features in order to predict the general location of origin. Furthermore, the anatomy of fossilized skull fragments of D. patagonica suggests that there are numerous plesiomorphic and apomorphic characters in comparison to respective extinct snakes, and present day snakes as well. These can be loosely attributed to the adaptive morphological characteristics present in the effects of terrestrial adaptation, in comparison to that of aquatic adaptation which would result in many more water adaptive features, especially in that of the skull and the spine as to ensure water to be a livable environment for the D. patagonica.

There are numerous resources for evidence of the morphological characteristics of D. patagonica, including a full medium sized skull of D. patagonica which also has the posterior brain, the vessels, the cranial nerves, the inner ear, as well as the semicircular canals of the skull structure: which have all been naturally endocranially cast, which has been recorded as the first natural endocranial casting of an extinct snake species. The information that has been studied and presented from this fossil has brought light to new information regarding the morphological importance of different characteristics within the semicircular canals, as well as the functionality of the olfactory bulb. Through the study of the lightly differentiated castings of the portions of the brain, it was assumed that D. patagonica was a terrestrial reptile due to the level of development of the olfactory sensory bulb within the cast brain.

Therefore, if it had to be deduced whether snakes, and more specifically, Dinilysia patagonica adapted terrestrially or aquatically, the presented studies all suggest in one form or another that the features and adaptations present in D. patagonica are more likely to be those of terrestrial adaptations than those of aquatic adaptations based on not only morphological characteristics, but plesiomorphic and apomorphic shared characteristics to that of current living snake species.

== Ecology ==
It has been suggested that Dinilysia may have fed on notosuchian crocodiles, theropod dinosaurs and flightless birds. It may have also fed on the young of these animals.
