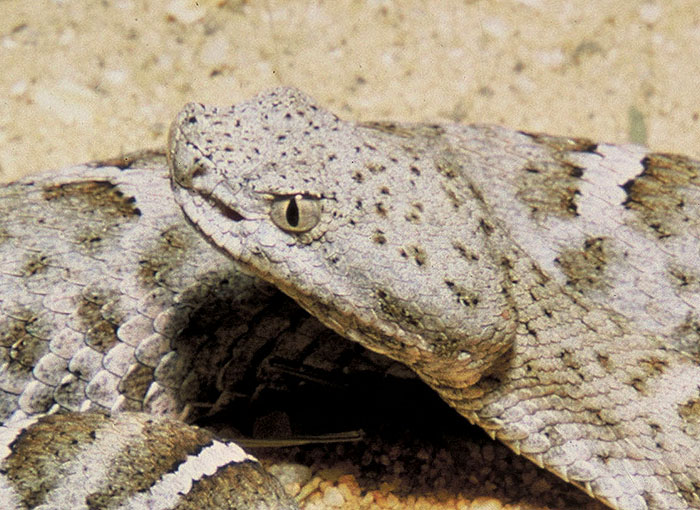
- Venomous snakes, such as the rattlesnake shown above, are the best-known venomous squamates

Scientific classification
- Kingdom: Animalia
- Phylum: Chordata
- Class: Reptilia
- Order: Squamata
- Clade: Toxicofera; Vidal & Hedges, 2005

Subgroups
- Anguimorpha; Iguania; Ophidia; †Mosasauria; †Polyglyphanodontia?; †Parviraptoridae?

Synonyms
- Pythonomorpha?

= Toxicofera =

Toxicoferans Temporal range: Bathonian–Present

Clade of scaled reptiles

Toxicofera (Latin for "toxin-bearers") is a clade of scaled reptiles (squamates) that includes the Serpentes (snakes), Anguimorpha (monitor lizards, beaded lizards, and alligator lizards) and Iguania (iguanas, agamas, and chameleons). Toxicofera contains about 4,600 species (nearly 60%) of extant Squamata. It encompasses all venomous reptile species, as well as numerous related non-venomous species. There is little morphological evidence to support this grouping; however, it has been recovered by all molecular analyses as of 2012.

== Cladistics ==
Toxicofera combines the following groups from traditional classification:

- Suborder Serpentes (snakes)
- Suborder Iguania (iguanas, agamid lizards, chameleons, etc.)
- Suborder Anguimorpha, consisting of:
  - Family Varanidae (monitor lizards)
  - Family Lanthanotidae (earless monitor lizard)
  - Family Anguidae (alligator lizards, glass lizards, etc.)
  - Family Helodermatidae (Gila monster and Mexican beaded lizard)
  - Family Shinisauridae (Chinese crocodile lizard)
  - Family Xenosauridae (knob-scaled lizards)

The relationship between these extant groups and a couple of extinct taxa are shown in the following cladogram, which is based on Reeder et al. (2015; Fig. 1).

- Toxicofera
  - - Serpentes
    - †Mosasauria
  - - Anguimorpha
    - - †Polyglyphanodontia
      - Iguania

Alongside these groups, Mosasauria, an extinct group including large marine reptiles primarily known from the Late Cretaceous, has been placed as part of the group. It has often been supposed that mosasaurs are most closely related to snakes, with the group containing the two dubbed Pythonomorpha. However, other studies have questioned this, finding that the closest relatives of mosasaurs are members of Varanoidea. Polyglyphanodontia, a group of extinct herbivorous lizards known from the Cretaceous, have also been placed as part of this group in some studies as the sister group to Iguania, though other studies have instead suggested that they are most closely related to Teiioidea and thus placed outside Toxicofera.

== Venom ==
Venom in squamates has historically been considered a rarity; while it has been known in Serpentes since ancient times, the actual percentage of snake species considered venomous was relatively small (around 25%). Of the approximately 2,650 species of advanced snakes (Caenophidia), only the front-fanged species (≈650) were considered venomous by the anthropocentric definition. Following the classification of Helodermatidae in the 19th century, their venom was thought to have developed independently. In snakes, the venom gland is in the upper jaw, but in helodermatids, it is found in the lower jaw. The origin of venom in squamates was thus considered relatively recent in evolutionary terms and the result of convergent evolution among the seemingly-polyphyletic venomous snake families.

In 2003 a study was published that described venom in snake subfamilies previously thought to lack it. Further study claimed nearly all "non-venomous" snakes produce venom to a certain extent, suggesting a single, and thus far more ancient origin for venom in Serpentes than had been considered until then. As a practical matter, Fry cautioned:

Some non-venomous snakes have been previously thought to have only mild 'toxic saliva'. But these results suggest that they actually possess true venoms. We even isolated from a rat snake [Coelognathus radiatus (formerly known as Elaphe radiata)], a snake common in pet stores, a typical cobra-style neurotoxin, one that is as potent as comparative toxins found in close relatives of the cobra. These snakes typically have smaller quantities of venom and lack fangs, but they can still deliver their venom via their numerous sharp teeth. But not all of these snakes are dangerous. It does mean, however, that we need to re-evaluate the relative danger of non-venomous snakes.

This prompted further research, which led to the discovery of venom (and venom genes) in species from groups which were not previously known to produce it, e.g. in Iguania (specifically Pogona barbata from the family Agamidae) and Varanidae (from Varanus varius). At the time, it was thought that this was the result of descent from a common venom-producing squamate ancestor; the hypothesis was described simply as the "venom clade" when first proposed to the scientific community. The venom clade included Anguidae for phylogenetic reasons and adopted a previously suggested clade name: Toxicofera.

This taxonomic rational, known currently as the "Toxicofera hypothesis," estimated that the common ancestral species that first developed venom in the venom clade lived on the order of 200 million years ago. The venoms were thought to have evolved after genes normally active in various parts of the body duplicated and the copies found new use in the salivary glands, though more recent research challenges the extent of this genetic recruitment to the venom system.

Among snake families traditionally classified as venomous, the capacity seems to have evolved to extremes more than once by parallel evolution; 'non-venomous' snake lineages have either lost the ability to produce venom (but may still have lingering venom pseudogenes) or actually do produce venom in small quantities (e.g. 'toxic saliva'), likely sufficient to assist in small prey capture, but not normally causing harm to humans if bitten.

The newly discovered diversity of squamate species producing venoms is a treasure trove for those seeking to develop new pharmaceutical drugs; many of these venoms lower blood pressure, for example. Previously known venomous squamates have already provided the basis for medications such as Ancrod, Captopril, Eptifibatide, Exenatide and Tirofiban.

The world's largest venomous lizard and the largest species of venomous land animal is the Komodo dragon.

=== Criticism ===
Other scientists such as Washington State University biologist Kenneth V. Kardong and toxicologists Scott A. Weinstein and Tamara L. Smith, have stated that the allegation of venom glands found in many of these animals "has had the effect of underestimating the variety of complex roles played by oral secretions in the biology of reptiles, produced a very narrow view of oral secretions and resulted in misinterpretation of reptilian evolution". According to these scientists "reptilian oral secretions contribute to many biological roles other than to quickly dispatch prey". These researchers concluded that, "Calling all in this clade venomous implies an overall potential danger that does not exist, misleads in the assessment of medical risks, and confuses the biological assessment of squamate biochemical systems".

More recent research has found that the majority of genes used to support the establishment of the Toxicofera clade were not uniquely expressed in venom and venom structures, but rather in multiple body structures and are likely to more closely reflect maintenance genes. This evidence, pointing to misinterpretation of phylogenetic trees and incomplete tissue sampling in formation of the Toxicofera hypothesis, places doubt on the assumption that the common ancestor of the clade was indeed venomous, and suggests instead that venom has evolved multiple times in reptiles.
