= List of the Mesozoic life of Alabama =

This list of the Mesozoic life of Alabama contains the various prehistoric life-forms whose fossilized remains have been reported from within the US state of Alabama and are between 252.17 and 66 million years of age.

== A ==
- Acirsa
  - †Acirsa americana – or unidentified related form
  - †Acirsa flexicostata
  - †Acirsa implexa
- Acmaea
- †Acroscapellum
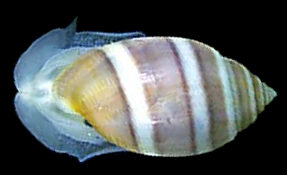
- A living Acteon barrel bubble sea snail
  †Acteon
  - †Acteon cicatricosus
- †Acutostrea
  - †Acutostrea plumosa
- †Aenona
  - †Aenona eufalensis
  - †Aenona eufaulensis
- †Agerostrea
  - †Agerostrea mesenterica
- †Albertosaurus
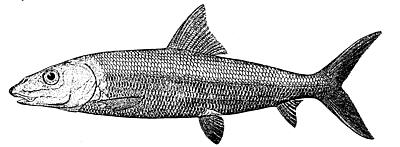
- Illustration of a living Albula bonefish
  †Albula
  - †Albula dunklei – type locality for species
- †Amaurellina
  - †Amaurellina stephansoni
  - †Amaurellina stephensoni
- †Ambigostrea
  - †Ambigostrea tecticosta
- †Ampullina
- Amuletum
- †Anatimya
  - †Anatimya anteradiata
- †Anchura
  - †Anchura abrupta
  - †Anchura noackensis
- †Ancilla
  - †Ancilla acutula
- †Anisomyon
  - †Anisomyon borealis – or unidentified related form
- †Anogmius
  - †Anogmius polymicrodus – or unidentified comparable form
- †Anomalofusus
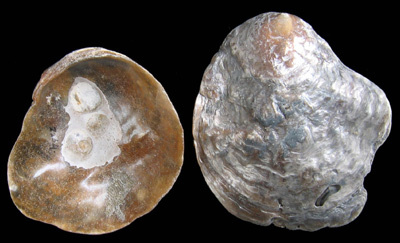
- Interior and exterior of a shell of an Anomia, or jingle shell
  †Anomia
  - †Anomia argentaria
  - †Anomia ornata
  - †Anomia perlineata – or unidentified comparable form
  - †Anomia preolmstedi
  - †Anomia tellinoides
- †Anomoeodus
- †Anteglossia
- †Antibythocypris
  - †Antibythocypris dimorphicus – type locality for species
  - †Antibythocypris nephrotrema – type locality for species
- †Antillocaprina
- Antropora – tentative report
  - †Antropora damicornis
- †Aphrodina
  - †Aphrodina eufaulensis
  - †Aphrodina tippana
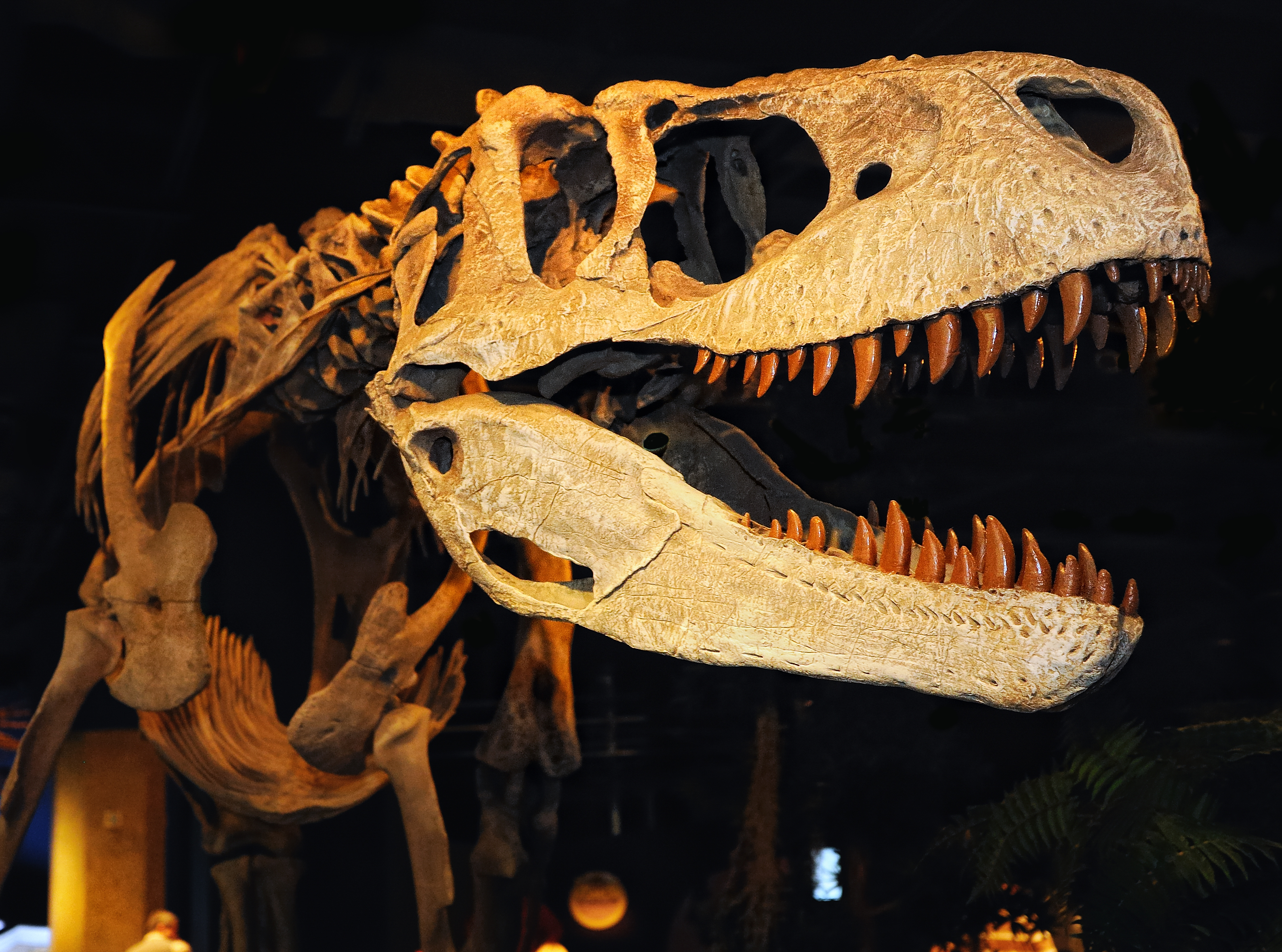
- Fossilized skull and skeleton of the Late Cretaceous primitive tyrannosaur Appalachiosaurus
  †Appalachiosaurus – type locality for genus
  - †Appalachiosaurus montgomeriensis – type locality for species
- Arca
  - †Arca martindalensis
  - †Arca rostellata
- Architectonica
- †Arcoscalpellum
  - †Arcoscalpellum hubricht
- †Arctostrea
  - †Arctostrea aquilerae
  - †Arctostrea falacata
- †Ariadnaesporites
  - †Ariadnaesporites cristatus – type locality for species
- Arrhoges
  - †Arrhoges plenacosta
- †Ascaulocardium
  - †Ascaulocardium armatum
- †Aspidolithus
  - †Aspidolithus parcus
- Astarte
  - †Astarte culebrensis
- Ataphrus
- †Atreta
  - †Atreta melleni
- †Avellana
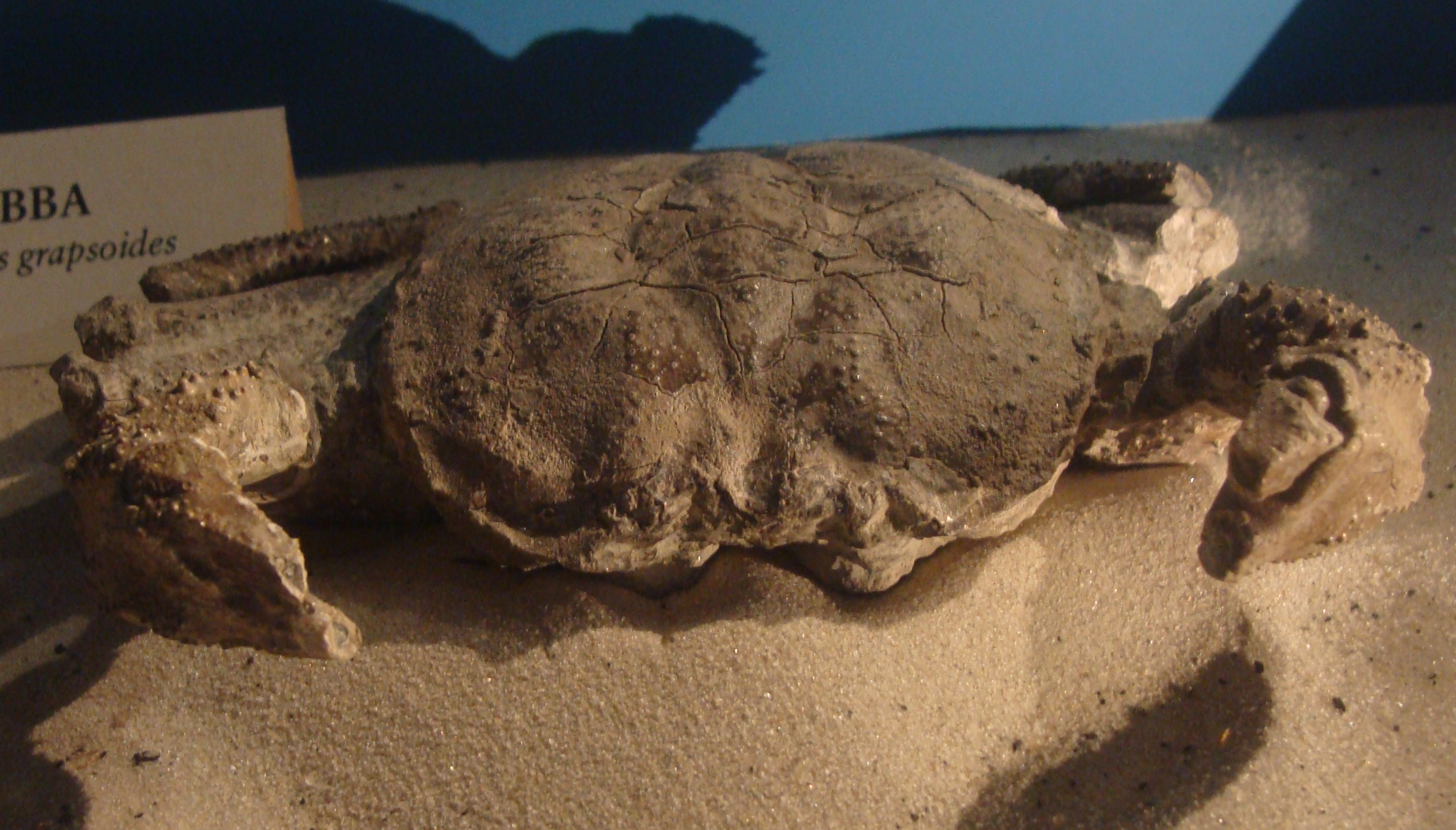
- Fossil of the Late Cretaceous crab Avitelmessus
  †Avitelmessus
  - †Avitelmessus grapsoideus

== B ==
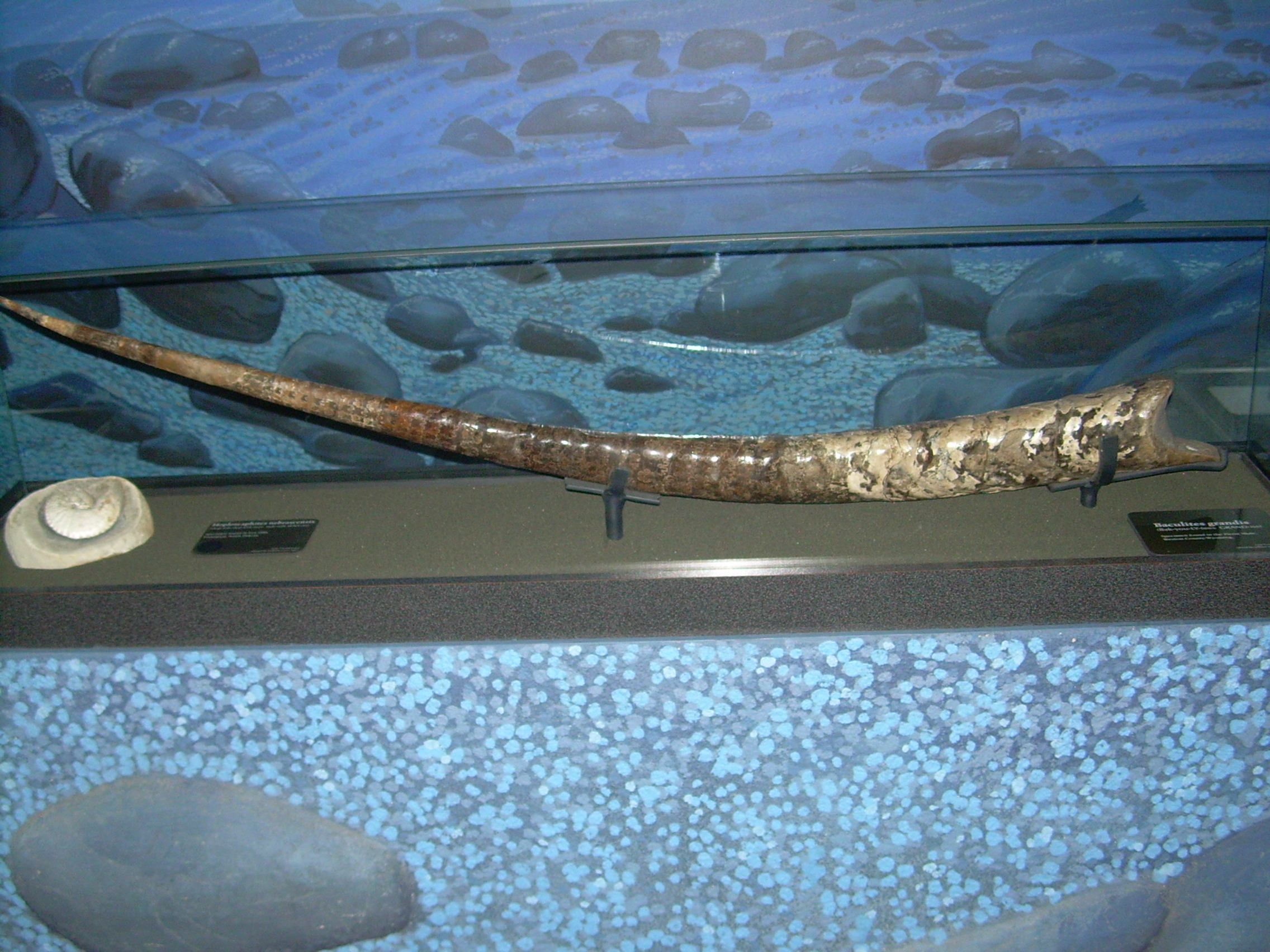
- Fossilized shell of the Late Cretaceous ammonoid cephalopod Baculites
  †Baculites
  - †Baculites arculus
  - †Baculites asper – or unidentified comparable form
  - †Baculites capensis
  - †Baculites tippahensis
- †Bananogmius
  - †Bananogmius crieleyi – type locality for species
  - †Bananogmius zitteli – or unidentified comparable form
- †Banis
  - †Banis siniformis
- Barbatia
- †Bathytormus
  - †Bathytormus pteropsis
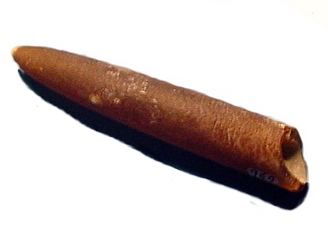
- Fossilized guard of the Late Cretaceous belemnoid cephalopod Belemnitella
  †Belemnitella
  - †Belemnitella americana
- †Bellifusus
  - †Bellifusus curvicostatus
- †Belliscala
- †Belemnitida
- †Belonostomus
- †Beretra
  - †Beretra ripleyana
- †Bothremys
- Botula
  - †Botula carolinensis
  - †Botula conchafodentis
  - †Botula ripleyana
- Brachidontes – tentative report
- †Brachycythere
  - †Brachycythere asymmetrica – type locality for species
- Brachydontes – tentative report
- †Buccinopsis
  - †Buccinopsis crassicostata
  - †Buccinopsis solida
- †Bukyraster
  - †Bukyraster hayi
- †Bulla – tentative report

== C ==
- Cadulus
  - †Cadulus obnutus
- Caestocorbula
  - †Caestocorbula crassaplica
  - †Caestocorbula crassiplica
  - †Caestocorbula percompressa
  - †Caestocorbula suffalciata
  - †Caestocorbula terramaria
- †Calcarichelys – type locality for genus
  - †Calcarichelys gemma – type locality for species
- †Calculites
  - †Calculites ovalis
- Callianassa
  - †Callianassa mortoni
- †Calliomphalus
  - †Calliomphalus americanus
  - †Calliomphalus nudus
- Calyptraea
- †Camptonectes
  - †Camptonectes argillensis
  - †Camptonectes bubonis
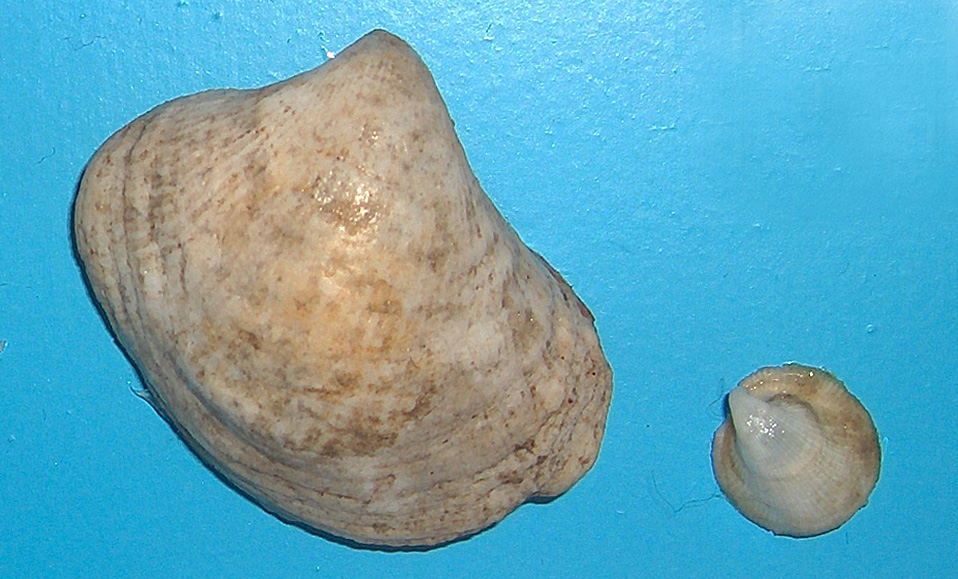
- Shells of modern Capulus cap sea snails
  Capulus
  - †Capulus spangleri
- Cardium
- Caryocorbula – tentative report
  - †Caryocorbula georgiana
  - †Caryocorbula veatchi
- †Caveola
- †Ceriopora
  - †Ceriopora vesiculosa
- Cerithiella
  - †Cerithiella nodoliratum – or unidentified related form
  - †Cerithiella semirugatum
- Cerithiopsis
- Cerithium
  - †Cerithium weeksi – or unidentified related form
- Charonia
- †Chedighaii
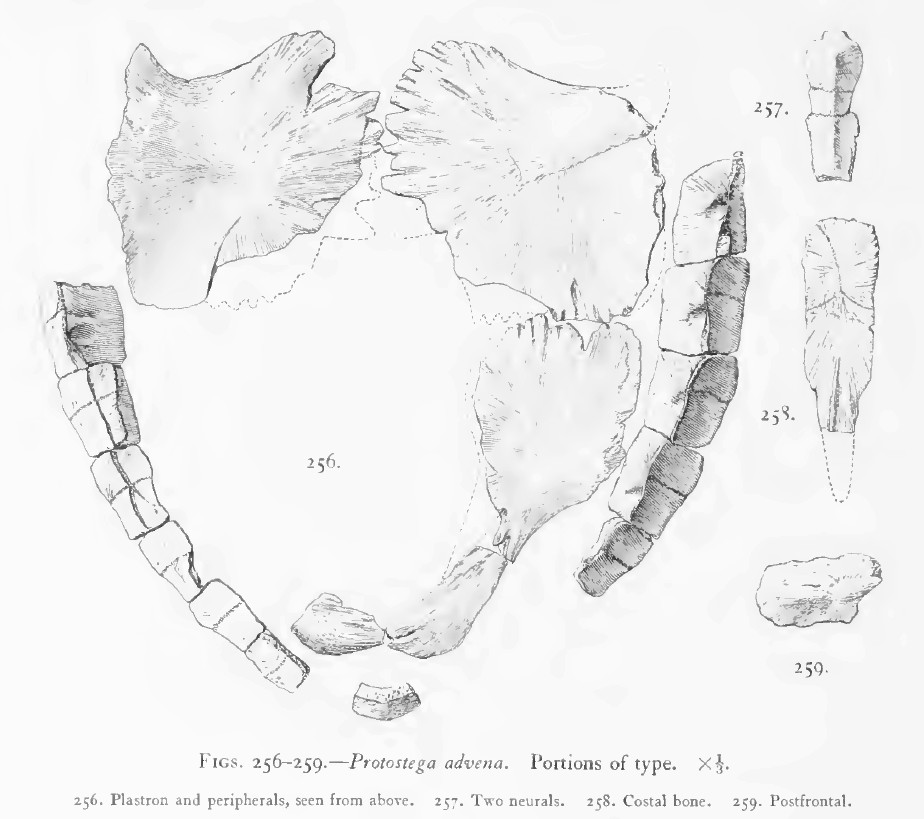
- Illustration of a fossilized skull found in Alabama; the type specimen of the Late Cretaceous sea turtle Chelosphargis
  †Chelosphargis
  - †Chelosphargis advena – or unidentified comparable form
- Chlamys
  - †Chlamys mississippensis
  - †Chlamys mississippiensis
- †Chondrites
- Cidaris
  - †Cidaris wahalakensis
- †Cimolichthys
  - †Cimolichthys nepaholica
- †Clarkiella
  - †Clarkiella hemispherica
- Clavagella
  - †Clavagella armata
- †Clavipholas
  - †Clavipholas pectorosa
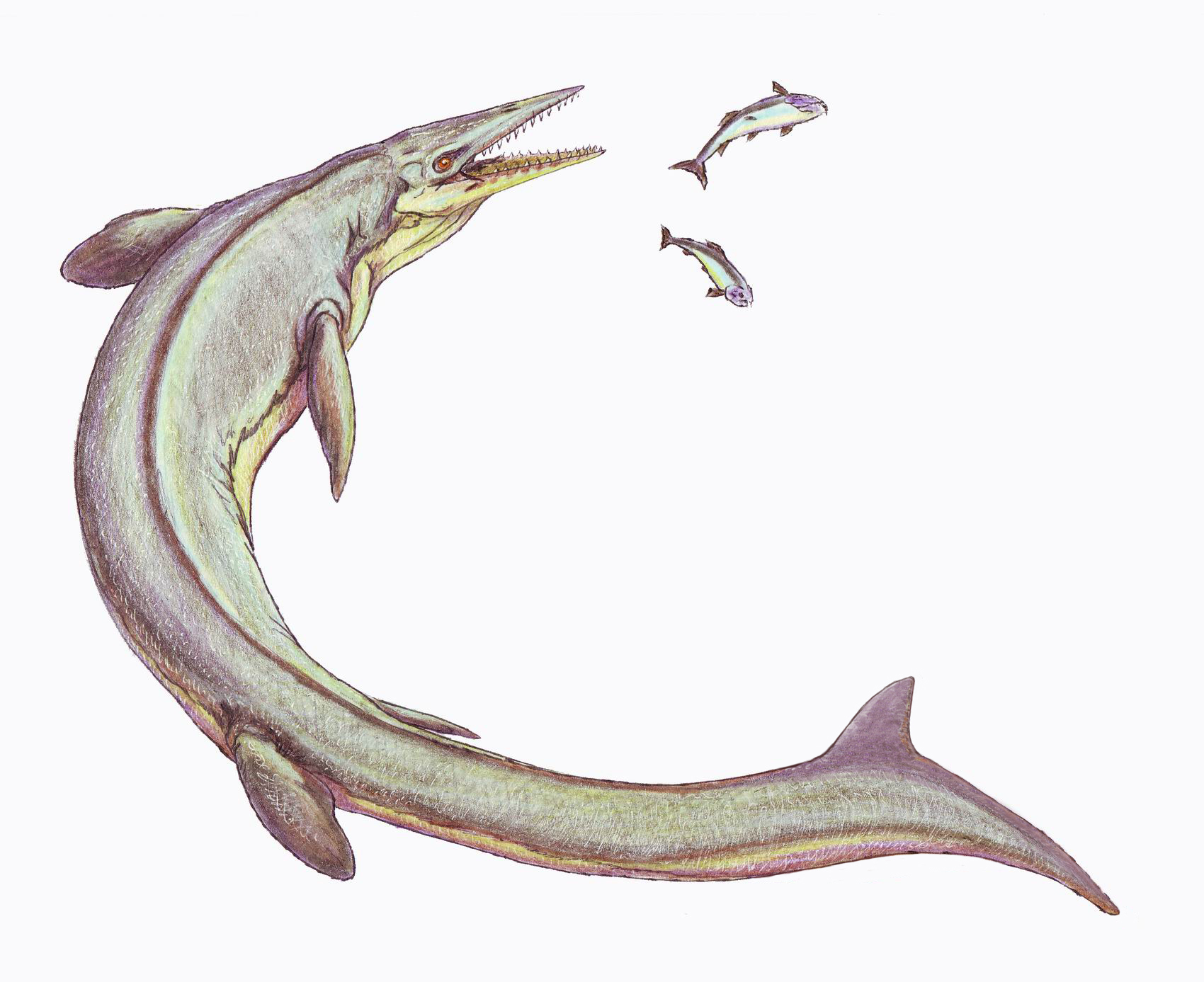
- Life restoration of the Late Cretaceous mosasaurid Clidastes
  †Clidastes
  - †Clidastes intermedius
  - †Clidastes liodontus
  - †Clidastes propython – type locality for species
- Cliona
  - †Cliona microtuberum
- †Clisocolus
  - †Clisocolus concentricum
- †Coahuilites
- Corbula
  - †Corbula subradiata
  - †Corbula torta
- †Corsochelys – type locality for genus
  - †Corsochelys haliniches – type locality for species
- Crassatella
  - †Crassatella vadosa
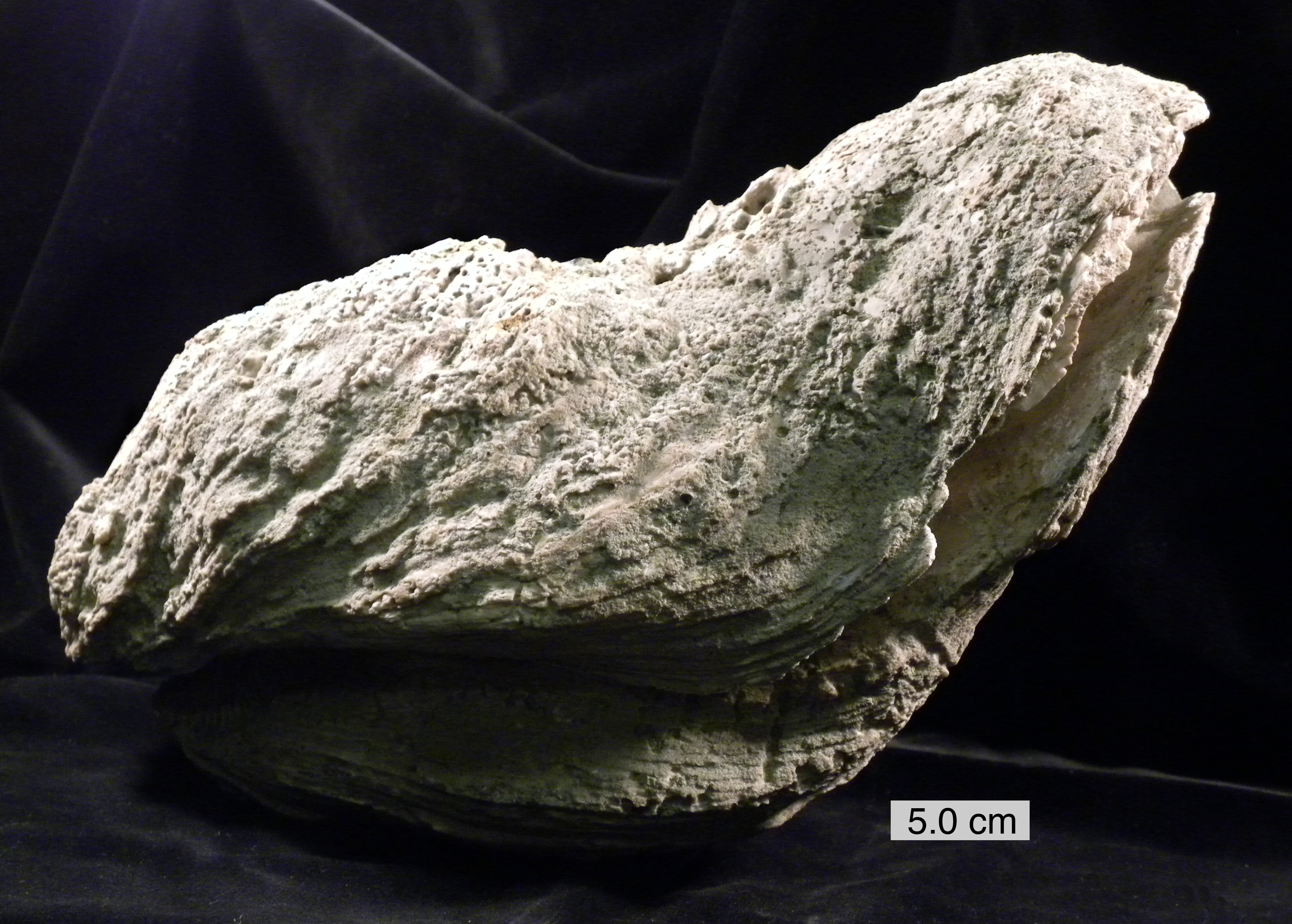
- Fossilized shell of the Cretaceous-modern oyster Crassostrea
  Crassostrea
  - †Crassostrea cortex
- †Crenella
  - †Crenella elegantula
  - †Crenella senica
  - †Crenella serica
- †Creonella
  - †Creonella triplicata
- †Cretiscalpellum
  - †Cretiscalpellum macrum
  - †Cretiscalpellum venustum
- †Cretodus
  - †Cretodus semiplicatus
- †Cretolamna
  - †Cretolamna appendiculata
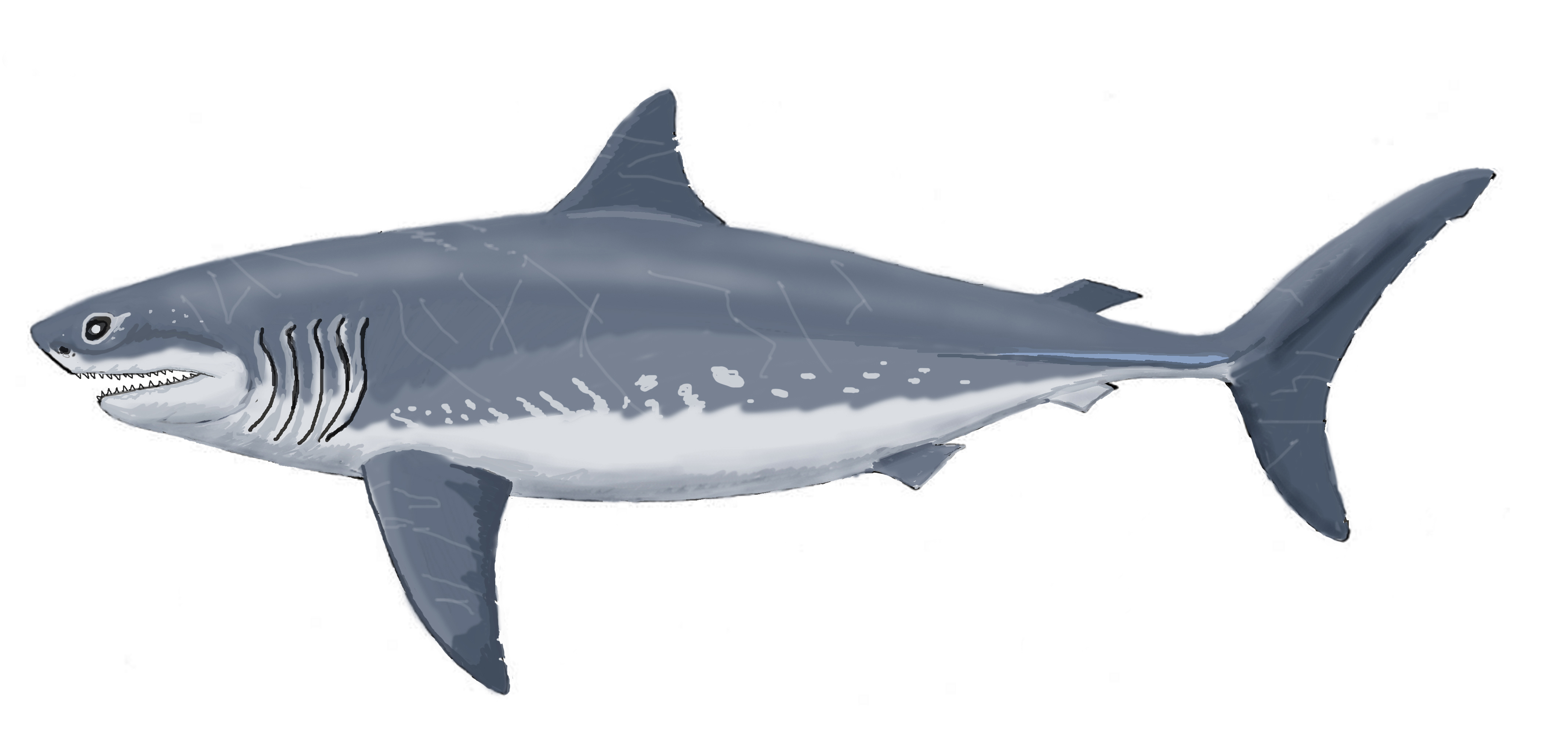
- Restoration of the Late Cretaceous shark Cretoxyrhina, or the Ginsu shark
  †Cretoxyrhina
  - †Cretoxyrhina mantelli
- Crucibulum
- Ctena
  - †Ctena parvilineata
- Ctenochelys – type locality for genus
  - †Ctenochelys acris – type locality for species
  - †Ctenochelys tenuitesta – type locality for species
- †Cubitostera
  - †Cubitostera tecticosta
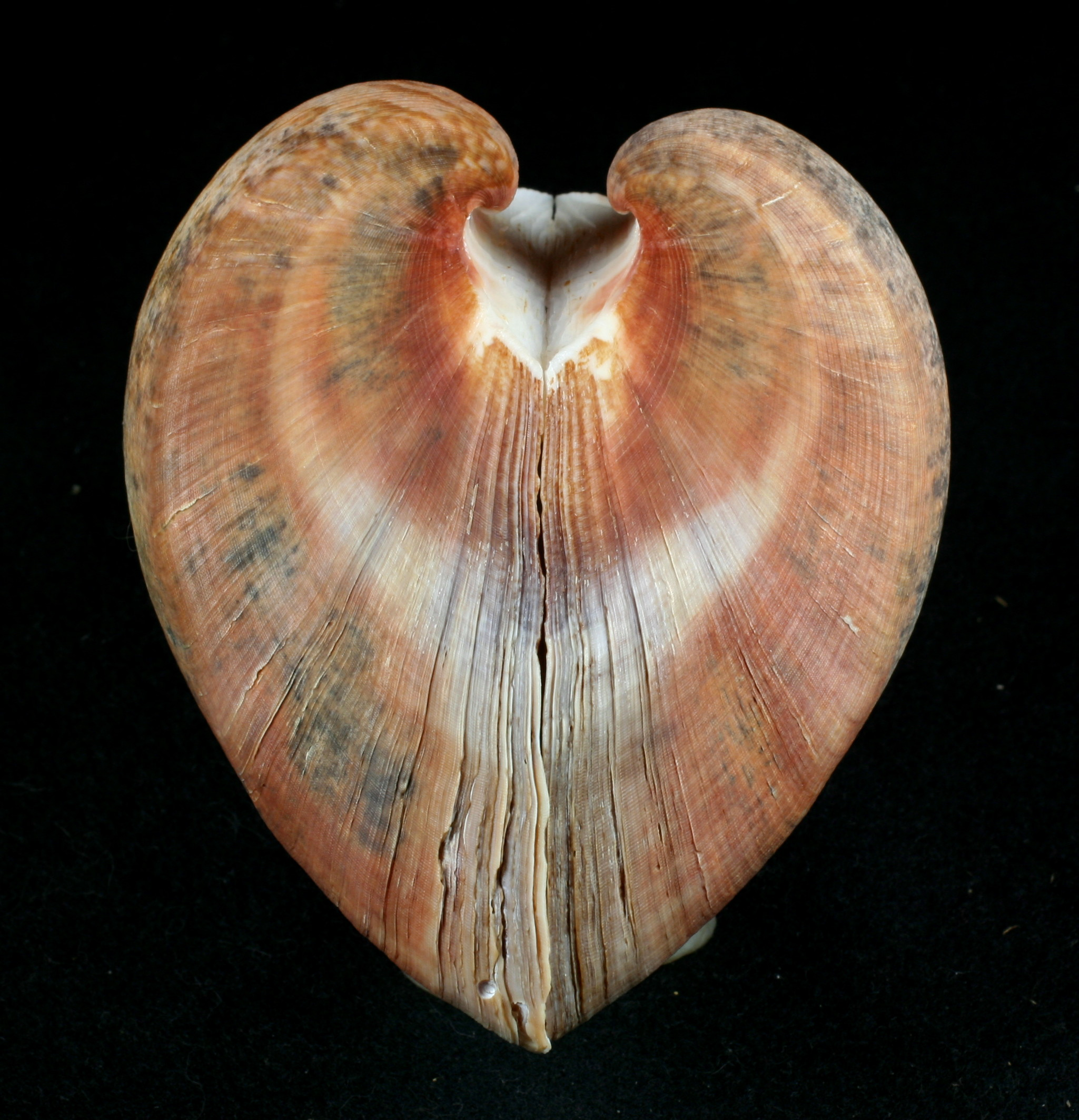
- Shell of a Cucullaea, or false ark shell
  Cucullaea
  - †Cucullaea capax
  - †Cucullaea littlei
  - †Cucullaea powersi – or unidentified comparable form
- †Cuna
  - †Cuna texana
- Cuspidaria
  - †Cuspidaria ampulla
  - †Cuspidaria grandis
  - †Cuspidaria grovensis
  - †Cuspidaria jerseyensis – or unidentified comparable form
- †Cyclorisma
  - †Cyclorisma parva
- Cylichna
  - †Cylichna diversilirata
  - †Cylichna incisa
- Cylichnella
- †Cylindrotruncatum
- †Cymbophora
  - †Cymbophora appressa
  - †Cymbophora berryi
  - †Cymbophora cancellosa
  - †Cymbophora lintea
  - †Cymbophora wordeni
- †Cymella
  - †Cymella bella
- Multiple views of a shell of a Cypraea cowrie sea snail
  Cypraea – report made of unidentified related form or using admittedly obsolete nomenclature
- †Cyprimeria
  - †Cyprimeria alta
  - †Cyprimeria depressa
- Cytherella
  - †Cytherella tuberculifera

== D ==
- Dasmosmilia
  - †Dasmosmilia kochii
  - †Dasmosmilia reesidi
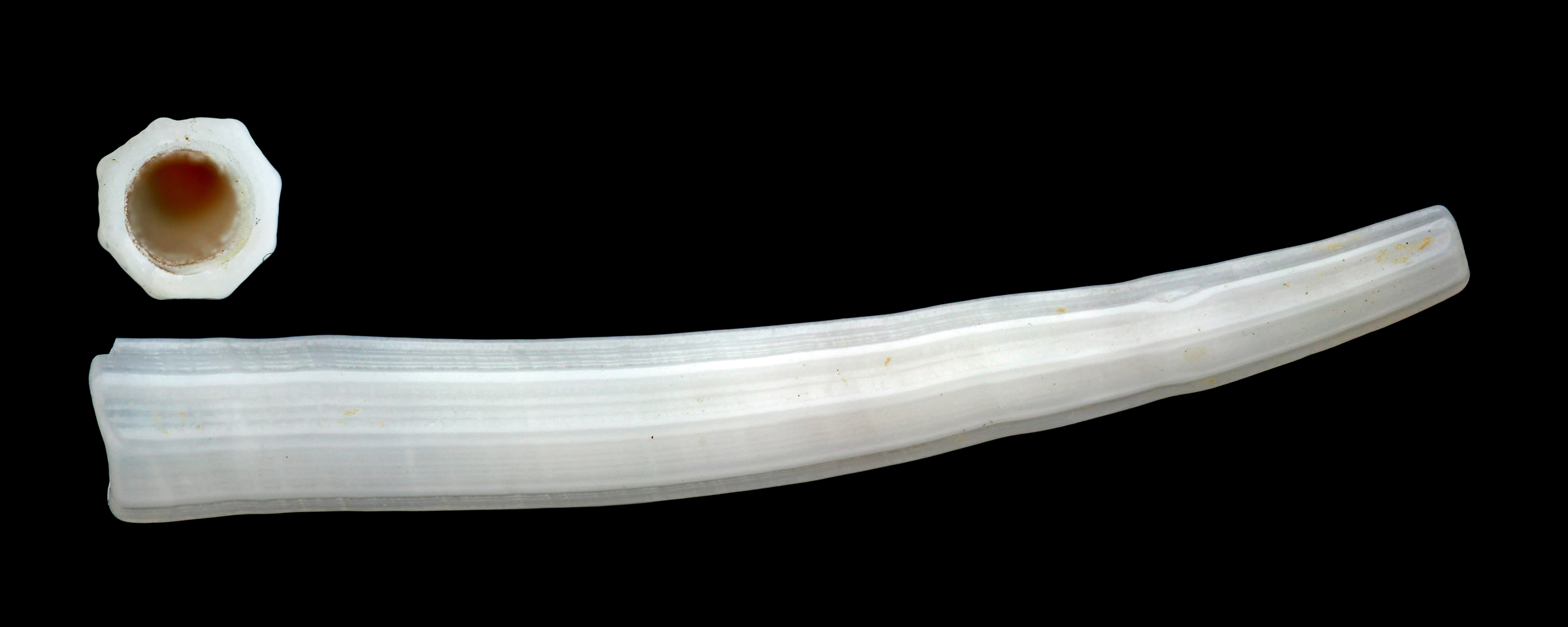
- Shell of a Dentalium tusk shell
  †Dentalium
  - †Dentalium leve
  - †Dentalium pauperculum
  - †Dentalium ripleyana
- †Deussenia
  - †Deussenia bellalirata
- †Dhondtichlamys
  - †Dhondtichlamys venustus
- †Diplomoceras
  - †Diplomoceras trabeatus
- †Discosaurus
  - †Discosaurus vetustus
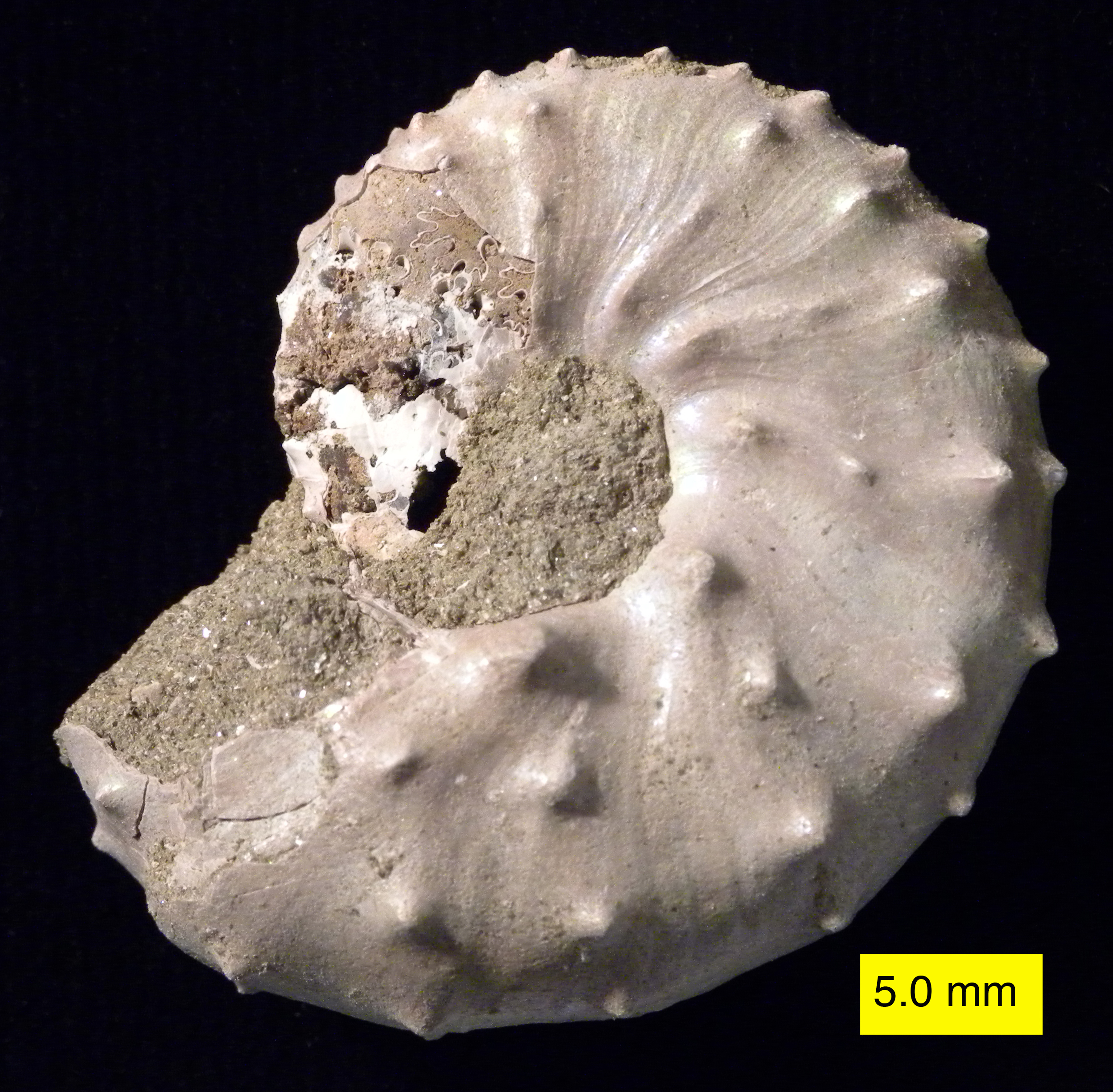
- Fossilized shell of the Late Cretaceous ammonoid cephalopod Discoscaphites
  †Discoscaphites
  - †Discoscaphites conradi
  - †Discoscaphites iris
- †Dolicholatirus
  - †Dolicholatirus torquatus
- †Drepanocheilus
  - †Drepanocheilus texanus
- †Drilluta
  - †Drilluta buboanus
  - †Drilluta lemniscata
  - †Drilluta major – or unidentified comparable form
- †Dysnoetopora – tentative report
  - †Dysnoetopora celleporoides

== E ==
- †Ecphora
- Edaphodon
  - †Edaphodon barberi – type locality for species
  - †Edaphodon mirificus
- †Ellipsoscapha
  - †Ellipsoscapha mortoni
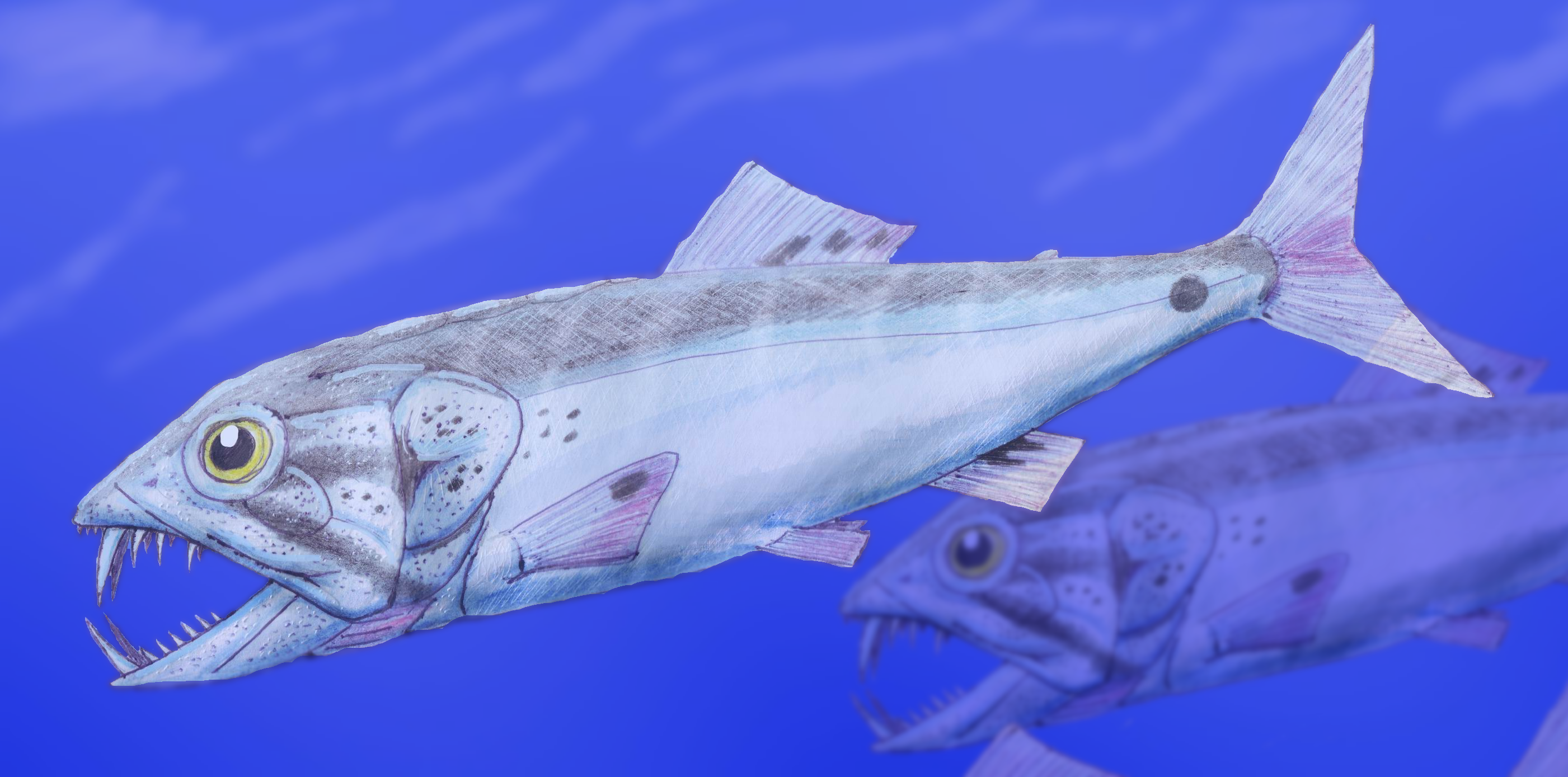
- Restoration of the Early Cretaceous-Eocene bony fish Enchodus, or the "saber-toothed herring"
  †Enchodus
  - †Enchodus petrosus
  - †Enchodus saevus – or unidentified comparable form
- †Endoptygma
  - †Endoptygma leprosa
- †Eoacteon
- †Eocypraea
  - †Eocypraea mortoni – type locality for species
- †Eocytheropteron
  - †Eocytheropteron mutafoveata – type locality for species
- Eonavicula
  - †Eonavicula newspecies1
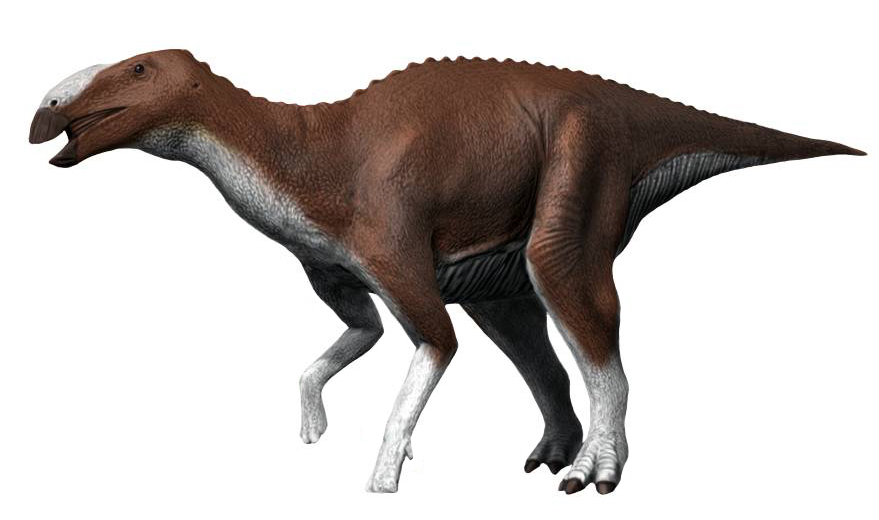
- Restoration of the Late Cretaceous duck-billed dinosaur Eotrachodon
  †Eotrachodon – type locality for genus
  - †Eotrachodon orientalis – type locality for species
- †Epitonium
  - †Epitonium sillimani
- †Etea
  - †Etea carolinensis
- †Eubaculites
  - †Eubaculites carinatus
- †Eufistulana
  - †Eufistulana ripleyana
- †Eufistulina
  - †Eufistulina ripleyana
- †Eulima
  - †Eulima gracilistylis
  - †Eulima monmouthensis
- †Euspira
  - †Euspira rectilabrum
- †Eutrephoceras
  - †Eutrephoceras dekayi
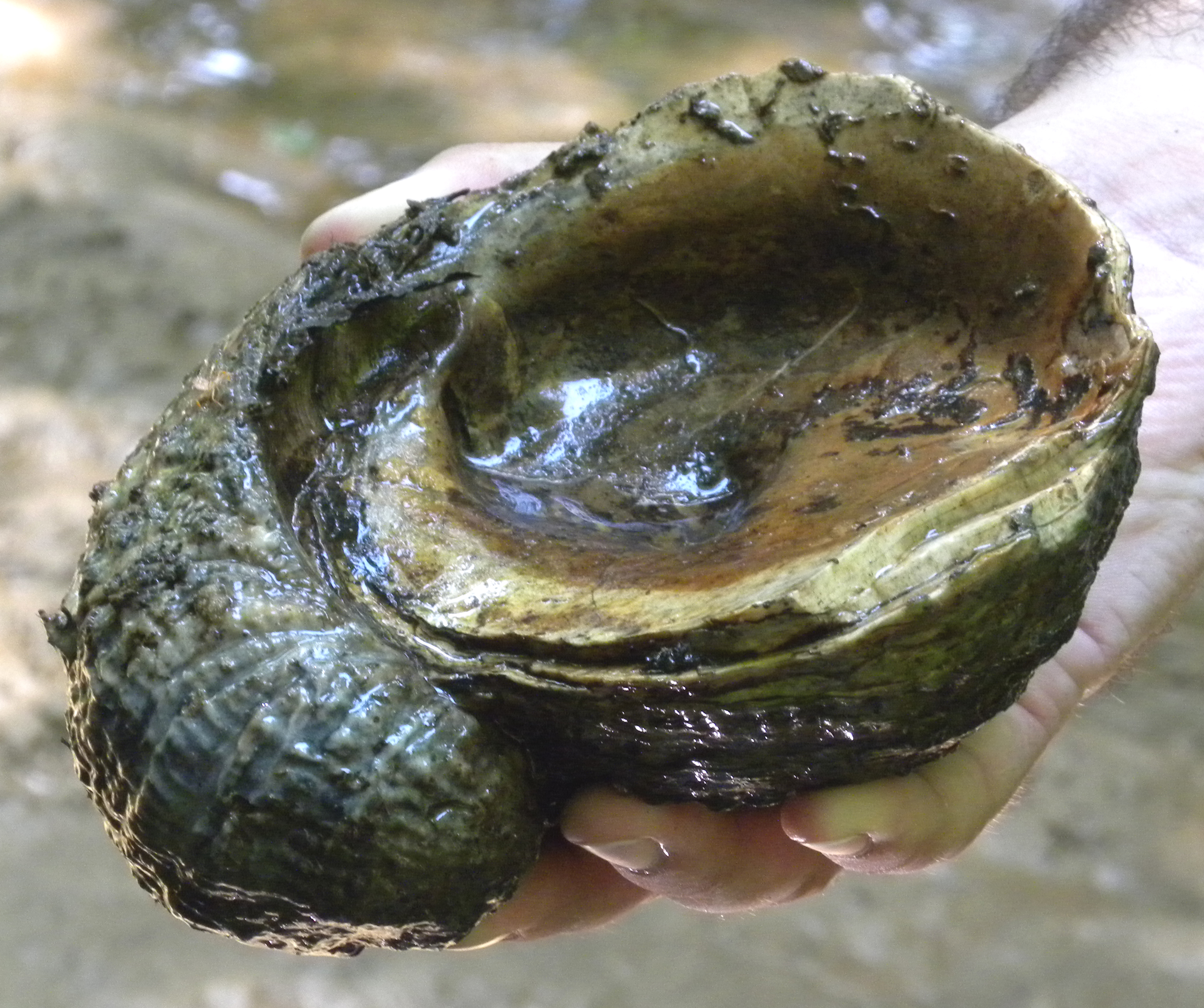
- Interior of a fossilized shell of the Jurassic-Cretaceous foam oyster Exogyra
  †Exogyra
  - †Exogyra costata
  - †Exogyra ponderosa
  - †Exogyra upatoiensis

== F ==
- †Fissocarinocythere
  - †Fissocarinocythere gapensis
- †Flemingostea
  - †Flemingostea subspatulata
- †Flemingostrea
  - †Flemingostrea cretacea
  - †Flemingostrea subspatula
- †Fulgerca
  - †Fulgerca attenuata – or unidentified related form
- †Fusimilis
  - †Fusimilis monmouthensis
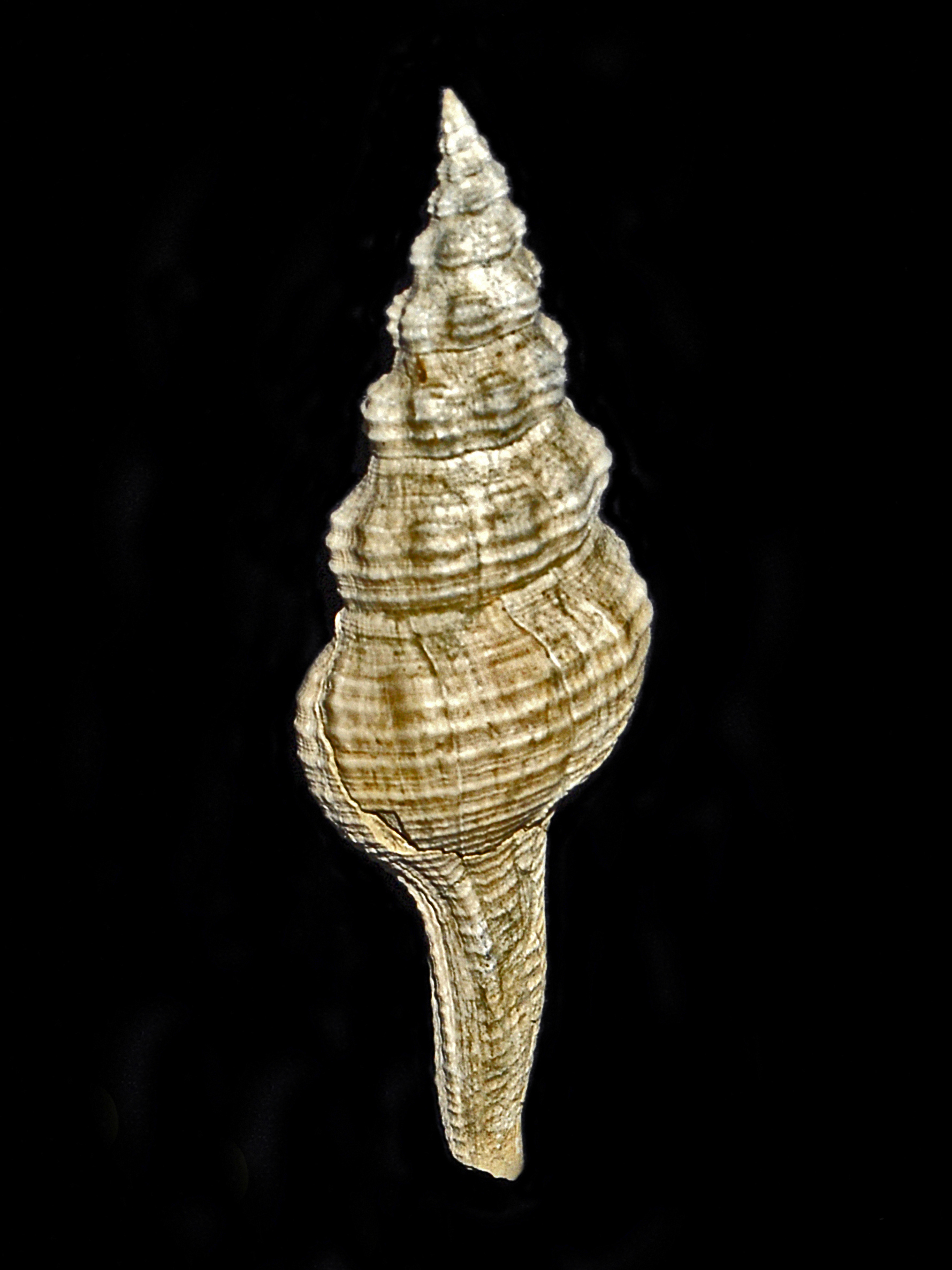
- Fossilized shell of the Cretaceous-modern spindle sea snail Fusinus
  Fusinus
  - †Fusinus macnairyensis – or unidentified related form

== G ==
- †Gegania
- Gemmula
  - †Gemmula cretacea
- †Gervillia
- †Gervilliopsis
  - †Gervilliopsis ensiformis
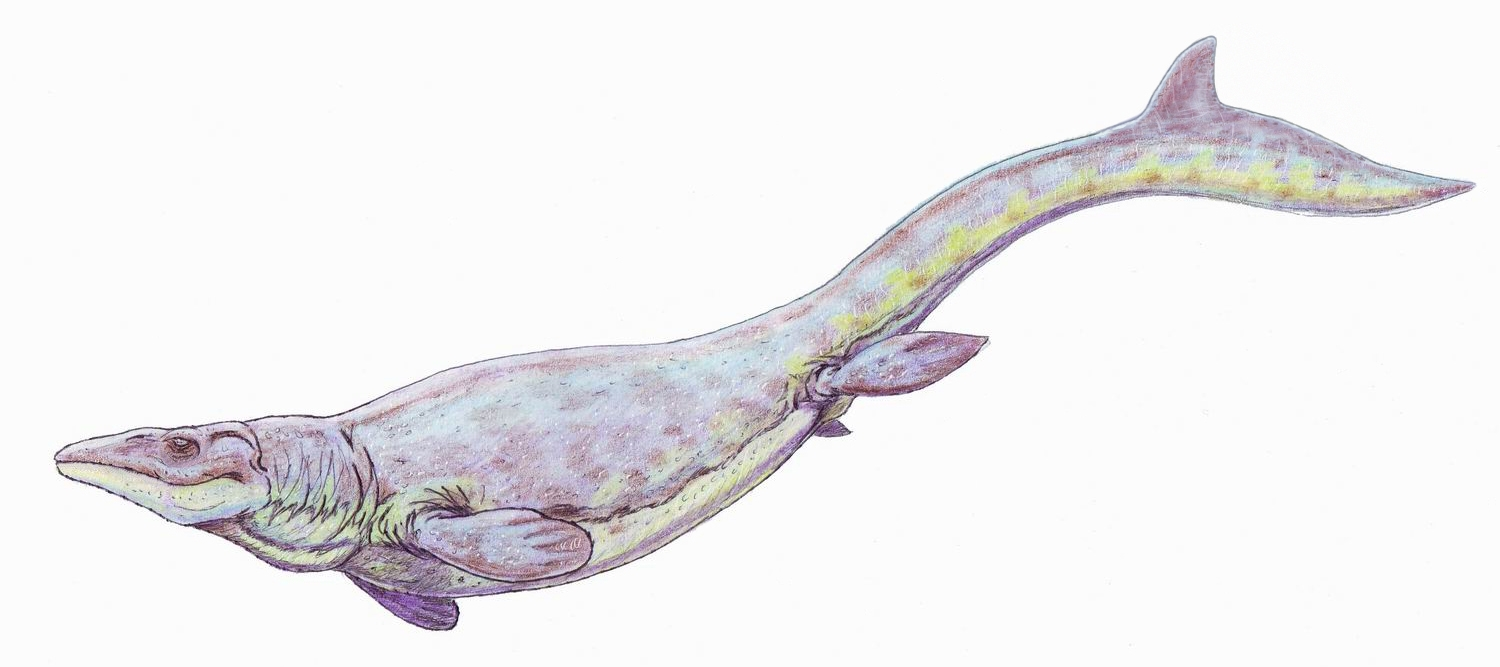
- Life restoration of the Late Cretaceous mosasaur Globidens
  †Globidens – type locality for genus
  - †Globidens alabamensis – type locality for species
- Glossus
- Glycymeris
  - †Glycymeris hamula
  - †Glycymeris rotundata
  - †Glycymeris subaustralis
- †Glyptoxoceras
- †Goniocylichna
  - †Goniocylichna elongata
- †Graciliala
  - †Graciliala decemlirata
- †Granocardium
  - †Granocardium alabam
  - †Granocardium alabamense
  - †Granocardium bowenae – or unidentified comparable form
  - †Granocardium deltanum
  - †Granocardium kuemmeli
  - †Granocardium kummeli
  - †Granocardium lowei
  - †Granocardium tholi
  - †Granocardium tippananum
  - †Granocardium tippanum
- †Graphidula
  - †Graphidula multicostata – or unidentified related form
  - †Graphidula terebriformis
- †Gryphaeostrea
  - †Gryphaeostrea vomer
- Gyrodes
  - †Gyrodes abyssinus
  - †Gyrodes americanus
  - †Gyrodes petrosus
  - †Gyrodes spillmani
  - †Gyrodes supraplicatus
- †Gyropleura
- †Gyrostrea
  - †Gyrostrea cortex

== H ==
- †Hadrodus
  - †Hadrodus priscus
- †Halimornis – type locality for genus
  - †Halimornis thompsoni – type locality for species
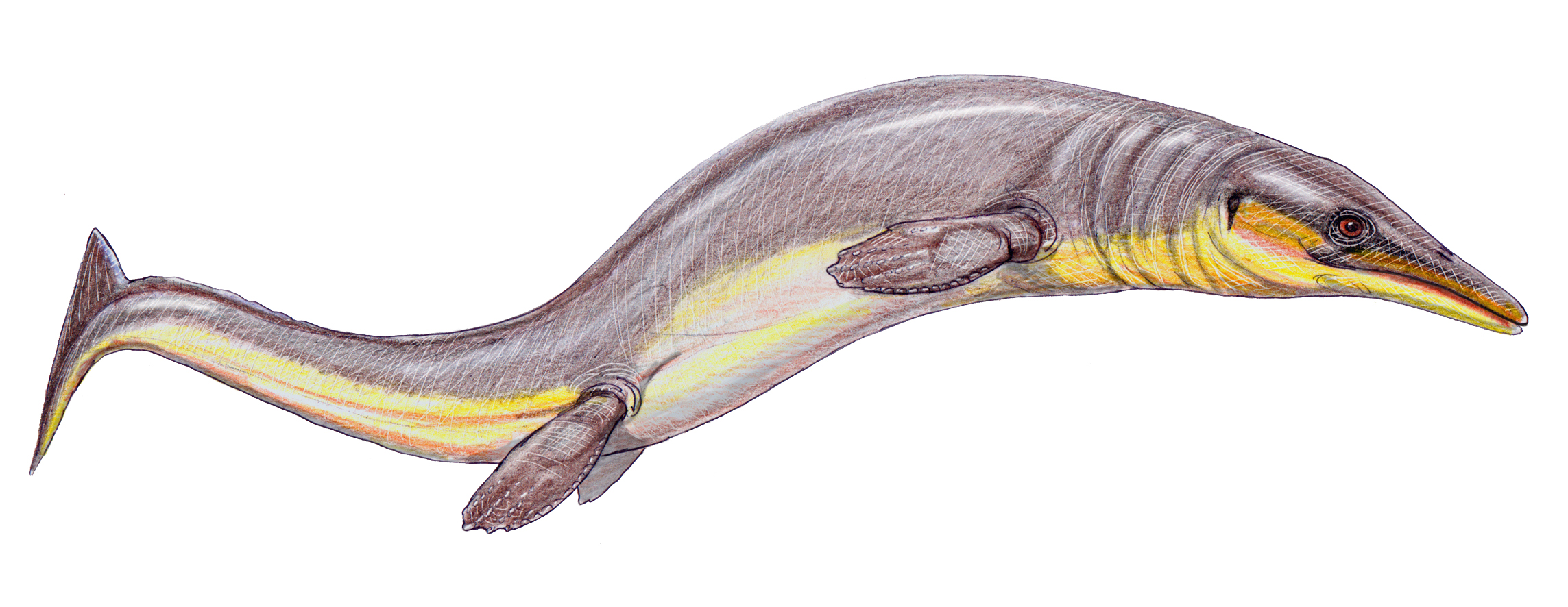
- Life restoration of the Late Cretaceous mosasaur Halisaurus
  †Halisaurus
  - †Halisaurus sternbergi
- †Hamulus
  - †Hamulus huntensis – tentative report
  - †Hamulus onyx
  - †Hamulus squamosus
- Haplocytheridea
  - †Haplocytheridea eutawensis
  - †Haplocytheridea renfroensis
- †Harduinia
  - †Harduinia aequorea
  - †Harduinia bassleri
  - †Harduinia mcglameryae – type locality for species
  - †Harduinia micrococcus
  - †Harduinia mortonis
- Haustator
  - †Haustator bilira
- †Helicaulax
  - †Helicaulax formosa
- †Helicoceras
- Hemiaster
  - †Hemiaster arcolensis – type locality for species
  - †Hemiaster wetherbyi
- †Hercorhynchus
  - †Hercorhynchus quadriliratus
  - †Hercorhynchus trililatus
- †Hercorhyncus
  - †Hercorhyncus tippanus
- †Heteromorpha
  - †Heteromorpha ammonite
- Hippoporina – tentative report
- Hoplopteryx – tentative report
- †Hoploscaphies – tentative report
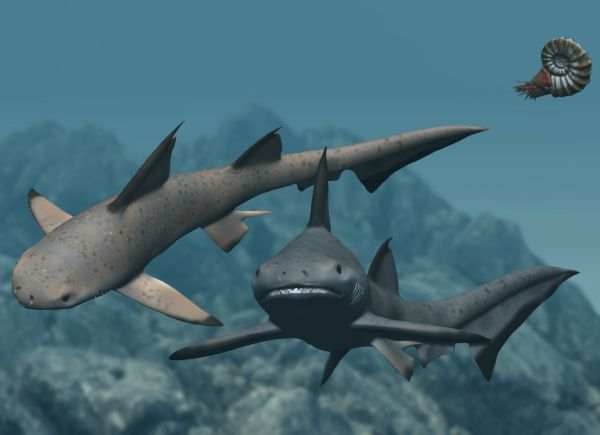
- Restoration of two of the Permian-Late Cretaceous cartilaginous fish Hybodus
  †Hybodus
- †Hydrotribulus – tentative report
- †Hypolophus

== I ==
- †Icanotia – tentative report
- †Ichthyodectes
  - †Ichthyodectes ctenodon – or unidentified comparable form
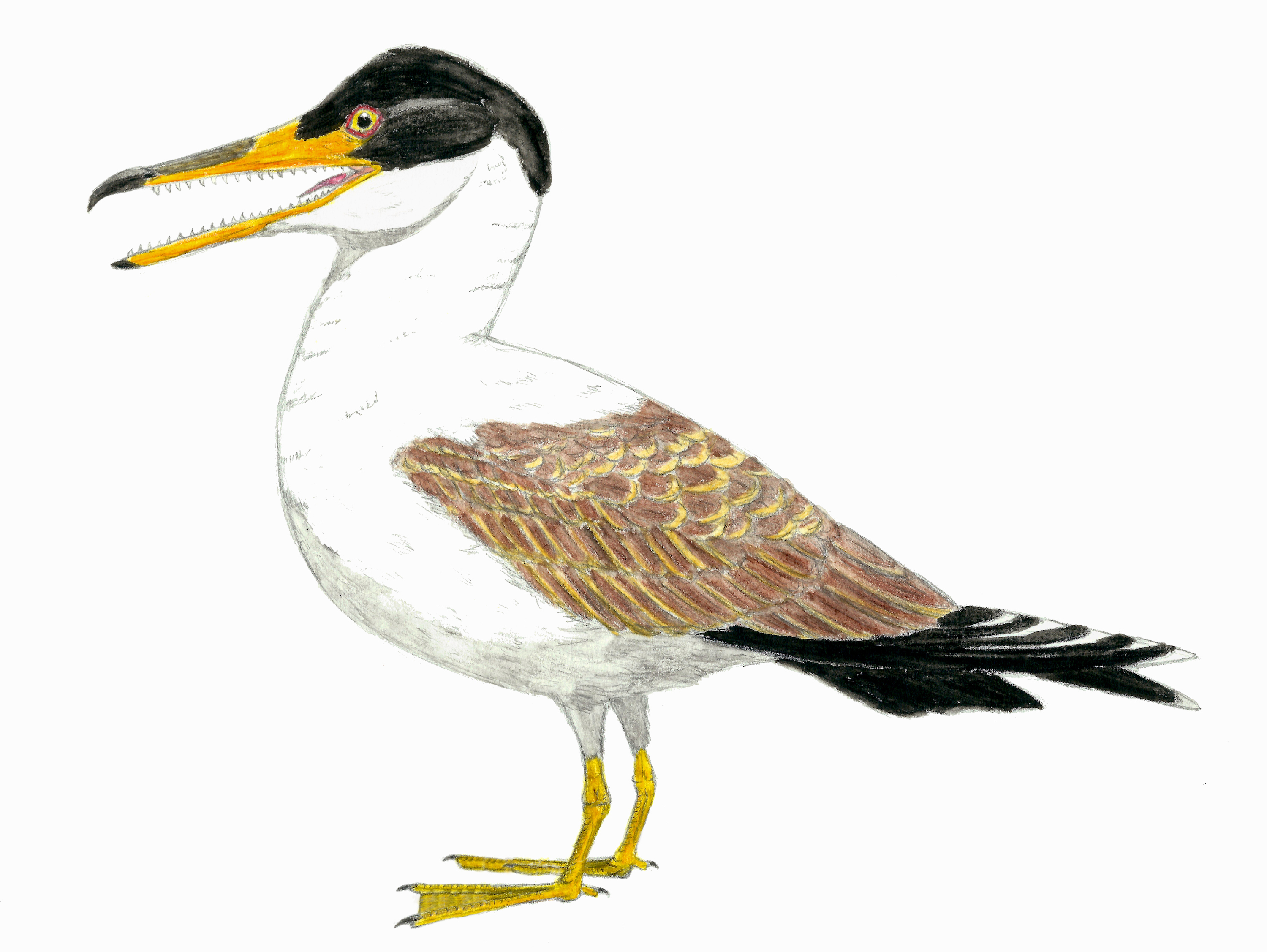
- Restoration of the Late Cretaceous toothed bird Ichthyornis
  †Ichthyornis – type locality for genus
  - †Ichthyornis dispar – type locality for species
- †Inoceramus
  - †Inoceramus sp A – informal
  - †Inoceramus sp B – informal
- †Ischyrhiza
  - †Ischyrhiza mira
- Isognomon
  - †Isognomon carolinensis

== J ==
- Juliacorbula
  - †Juliacorbula monmouthensis

== K ==
- †Kummelia

== L ==
- Laternula
  - †Laternula robusta
- †Latiala
  - †Latiala lobata
- †Laxispira
  - †Laxispira monilifera
- †Legumen
  - †Legumen carolinense – or unidentified related form
  - †Legumen ellipticum
- †Leptosolen
  - †Leptosolen biplicata
  - †Leptosolen bipticatus
- Lima
  - †Lima deatsvillensis
  - †Lima geronimoensis
  - †Lima pelagica
- Limatula
  - †Limatula acutilineata
- Limopsis
  - †Limopsis meeki
  - †Limopsis perbrevis
- †Linearia
  - †Linearia crebelli
  - †Linearia weiseri
- †Linearis
  - †Linearis magnoliensis
  - †Linearis metastriata
  - †Linearis pectinis
- †Linter
  - †Linter acutata
- †Linthia
  - †Linthia variabilis
- †Liopeplum
  - †Liopeplum canalis
  - †Liopeplum cretaceum
  - †Liopeplum rugosum
- †Liopistha
  - †Liopistha protexta
- †Liothyris
  - †Liothyris carolinensis – or unidentified comparable form
- Lithophaga
  - †Lithophaga borealis – or unidentified comparable form
- †Longitubus
- †Longoconcha
  - †Longoconcha dalli – tentative report
- Lopha
  - †Lopha falcata
  - †Lopha mesenterica
  - †Lopha ucheensis
- †Lophochelys
  - †Lophochelys venatrix – type locality for species
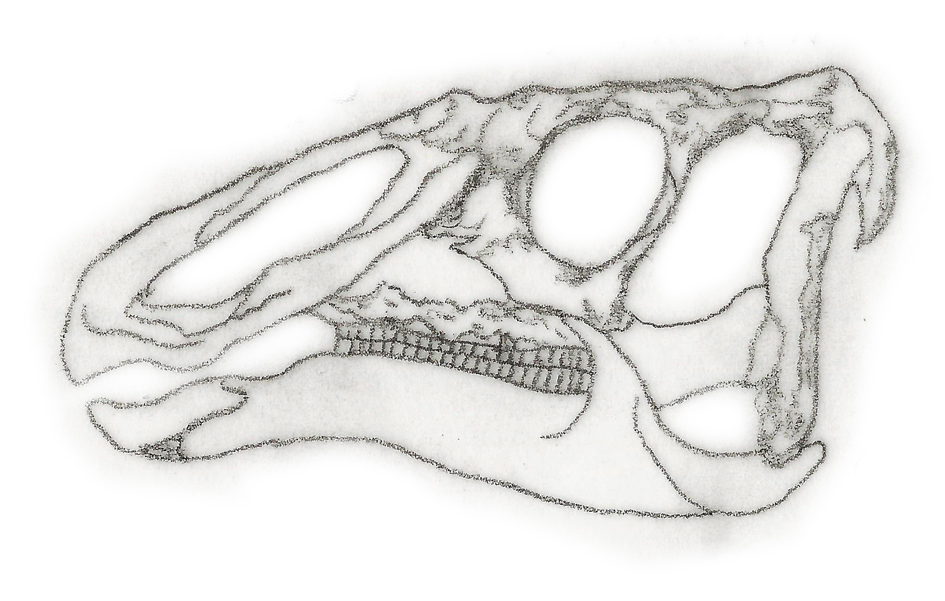
- Illustration of a fossilized skull of the Late Cretaceous duck-billed dinosaur Lophorhothon
  †Lophorhothon – type locality for genus
  - †Lophorhothon atopus – type locality for species
- †Lowenstamia
  - †Lowenstamia cucullata
  - †Lowenstamia subplanas
- †Loxotoma
- †Lucina
- †Lupira
- †Lycettia
  - †Lycettia tippana
  - †Lycettia tippanus
- †Lyriochlamys
  - †Lyriochlamys cretosus

== M ==
- Malletia
  - †Malletia littlei
  - †Malletia longfrons
  - †Malletia longifrons
  - †Malletia stephensoni
- †Margaritella
  - †Margaritella pumila
- Martesia
- †Mataxa
- †Mathilda
  - †Mathilda cedarensis – or unidentified comparable form
  - †Mathilda ripleyana – or unidentified related form
- †Medionapus
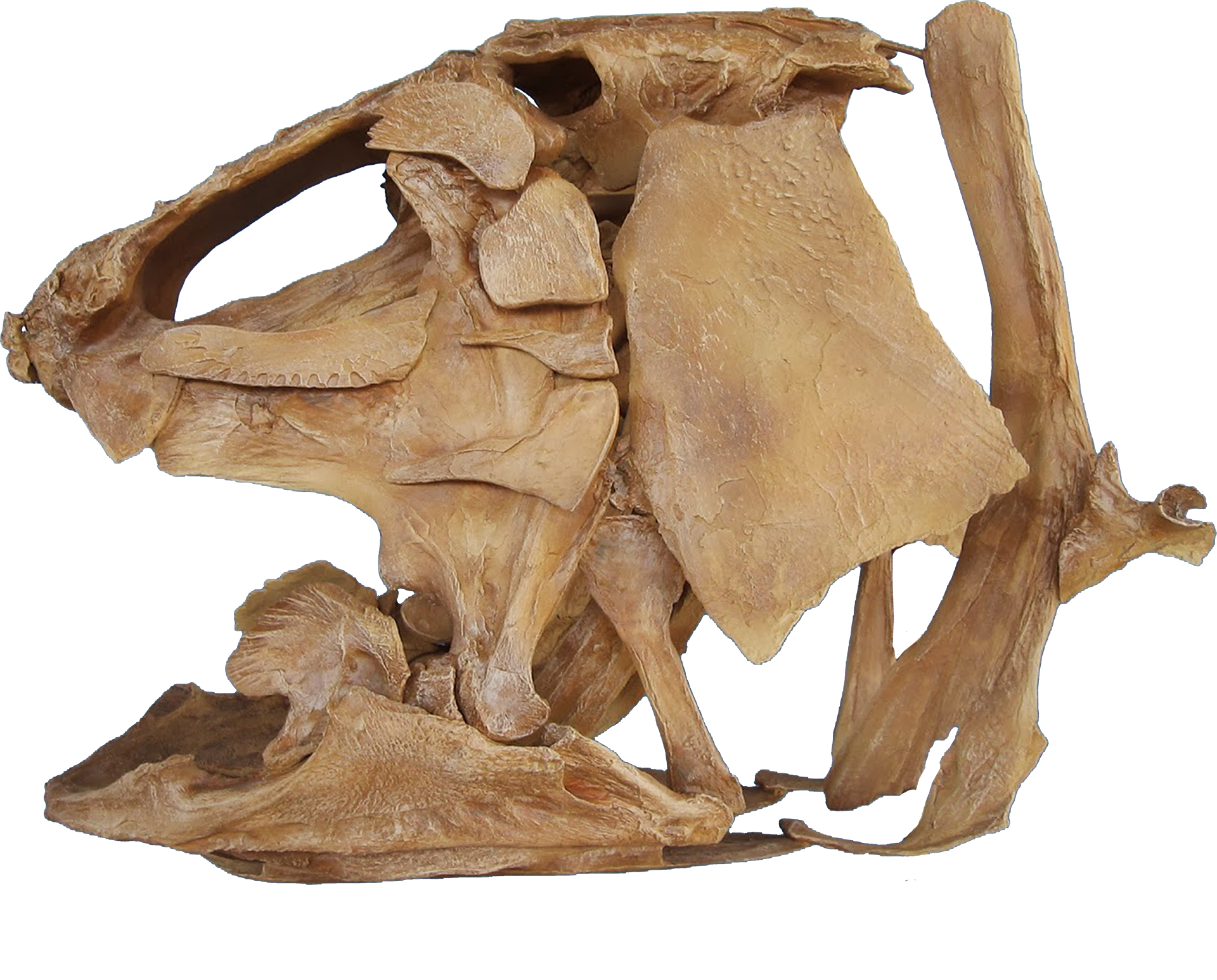
- Fossilized skull of the Late Cretceous coelacanth fish Megalocoelacanthus
  †Megalocoelacanthus – type locality for genus
  - †Megalocoelacanthus dobiei – type locality for species
- Menippe
- †Mesostoma
- †Micrabacia
  - †Micrabacia cribaria
  - †Micrabacia marylandica
- †Modiolus
  - †Modiolus sedesclaris
  - †Modiolus sedesclarus
  - †Modiolus trigonus
- †Moorevillia – type locality for genus
  - †Moorevillia hardi – type locality for species
- †Morea
  - †Morea rotunda – or unidentified comparable form
  - †Morea transenna
- †Myobarbum
  - †Myobarbum laevigatum
- Myrtea
  - †Myrtea stephensoni

== N ==
- †Napulus
  - †Napulus octoliratus
- †Neithea
  - †Neithea bexarensis
  - †Neithea quinquecostata
  - †Neithea quinquecostatus
- †Nemocardium
  - †Nemocardium fragile
- †Nemodon
  - †Nemodon eufalensis
  - †Nemodon eufaulensis
  - †Nemodon grandis
  - †Nemodon martindalensis
  - †Nemodon stantoni
- †Nonactaeonina
- Nozeba
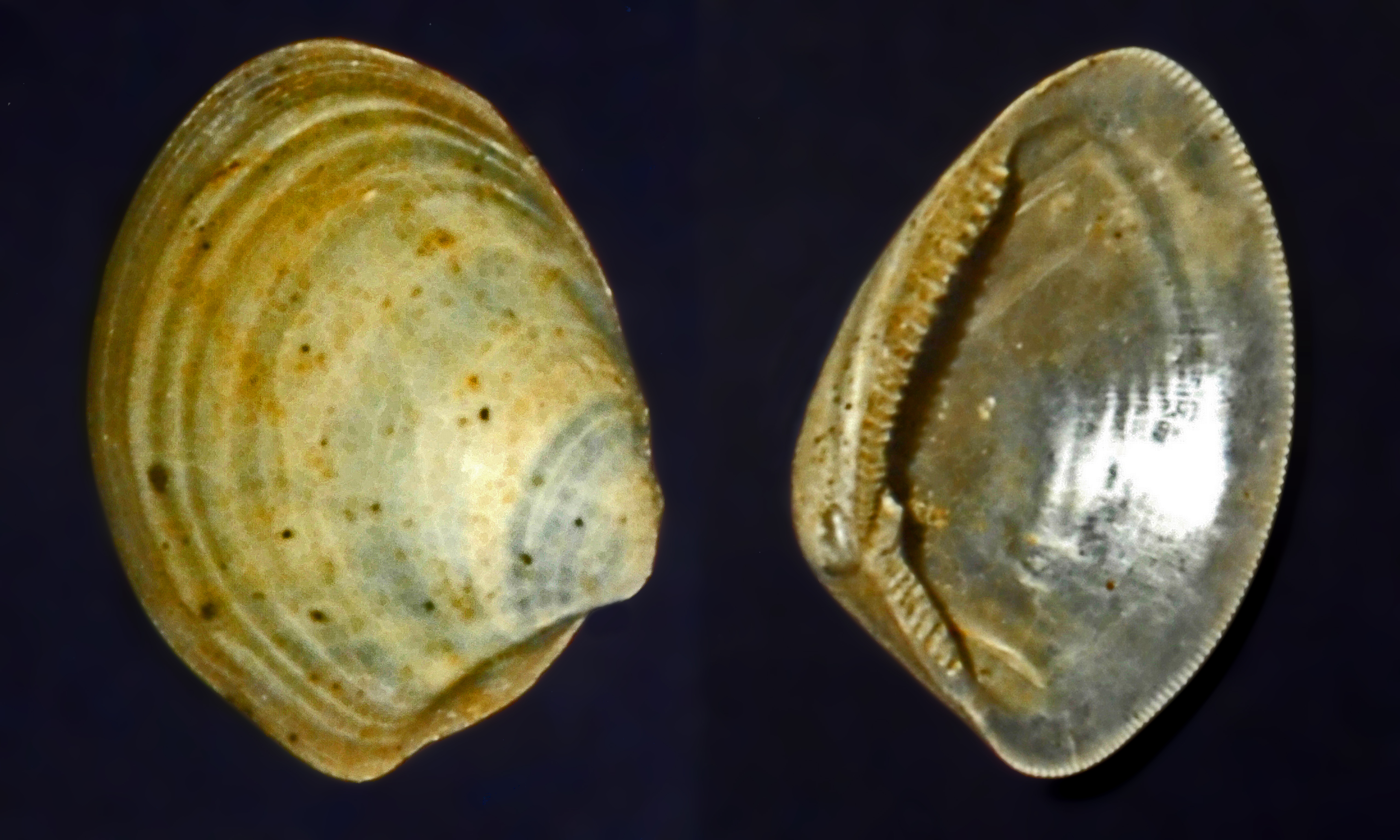
- Interior of a fossilized shell of the Early Ordovician-modern marine bivalve Nucula
  Nucula
  - †Nucula camia
  - †Nucula cuneifrons
  - †Nucula percrassa
  - †Nucula severnensis
- Nuculana
  - †Nuculana corbetensis
  - †Nuculana longifrons
  - †Nuculana rostratruncata
  - †Nuculana whitfieldi
- †Nymphalucina
  - †Nymphalucina linearia

== O ==
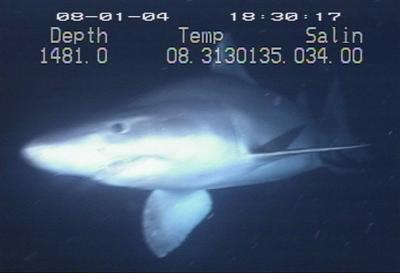
- A living Odontaspis sand shark
  Odontaspis
- †Opertochasma
- †Ornatoporta – tentative report
  - †Ornatoporta marylandica
- †Ornopsis
- Ostrea
  - †Ostrea ucheensis

== P ==
- †Pachydiscus
- †Pachymelania – tentative report
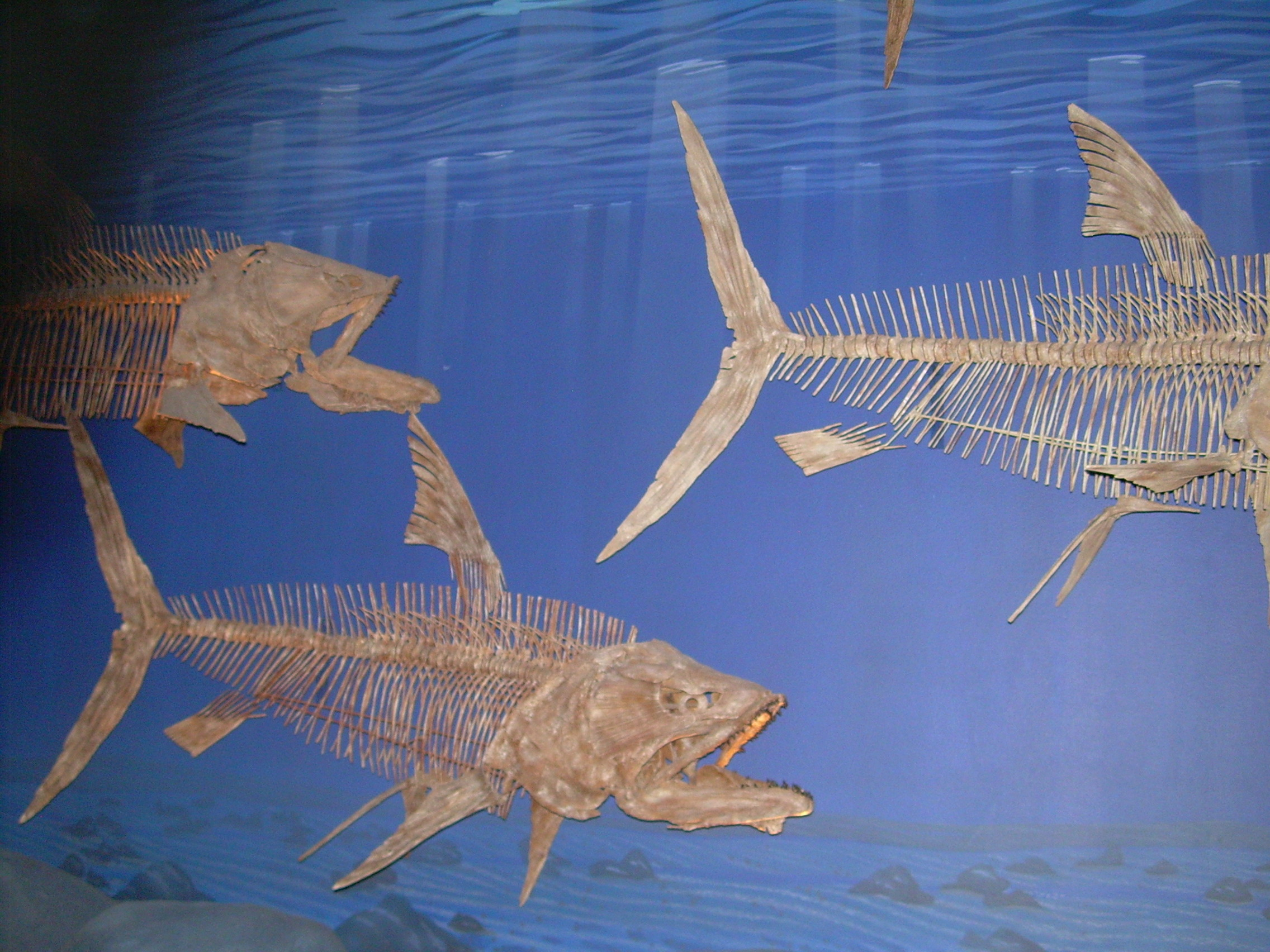
- Fossilized skeletons of the Late Cretaceous bony fish Pachyrhizodus
  †Pachyrhizodus
  - †Pachyrhizodus caninus
  - †Pachyrhizodus kingi
  - †Pachyrhizodus minimus
- Pagurus
  - †Pagurus convexus – type locality for species
- †Paladmete
  - †Paladmete cancellaria
  - †Paladmete gardnerae
  - †Paladmete laevis
- †Palelops
  - †Palelops eutawensis
- †Paleopsephaea – tentative report
- Panopea
  - †Panopea monmouthensis
- †Parafusus
- †Paranomia
  - †Paranomia scabra
- †Parmicorbula
  - †Parmicorbula percompressa
  - †Parmicorbula suffalciata
  - †Parmicorbula terramaria
- †Pecten
  - †Pecten venustus
- †Periplomya
- †Perrisonota
  - †Perrisonota gabbi
  - †Perrisonota littlei
  - †Perrisonota protexta
- †Phacodus
  - †Phacodus punctatus
- Phacoides
  - †Phacoides mattiformis – tentative report
- †Phelopteria
  - †Phelopteria linguiformis
- Pholadomya
  - †Pholadomya occidentalis
  - †Pholadomya tippana
- †Piestochilus
- †Pinna
  - †Pinna laqueata
- †Placenticeras
  - †Placenticeras benningi
- †Plagiostoma
  - †Plagiostoma woodsi – tentative report
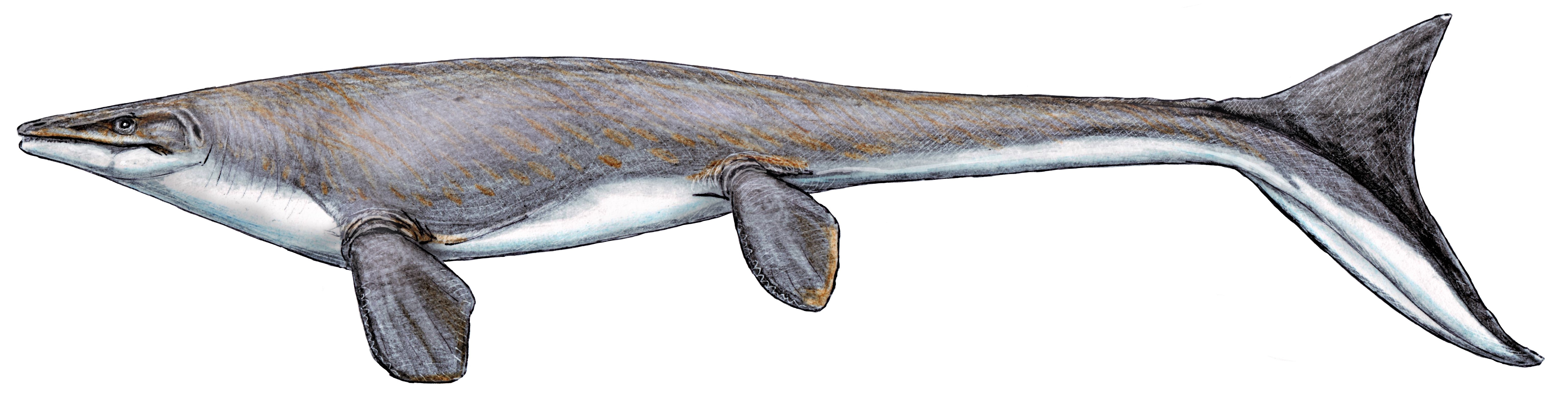
- Restoration of the Late Cretaceous mosasaur Platecarpus
  †Platecarpus
- †Pleuriocardia
  - †Pleuriocardia eufaulense
- †Pleuronea
  - †Pleuronea alveolata
- Plicatula
  - †Plicatula mullicaensis
  - †Plicatula tetrica
- Polinices
  - †Polinices kummeli
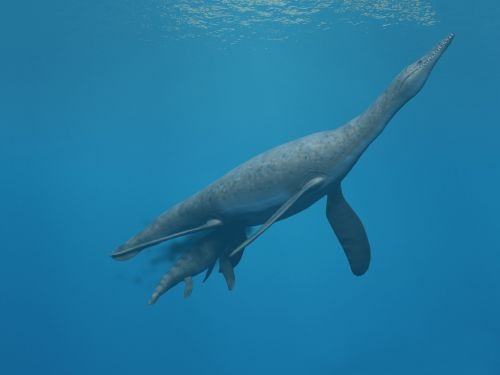
- Life restoration of the Late Cretaceous polycotylid plesiosaur Polycotylus giving birth
  †Polycotylus
  - †Polycotylus latipinnis
- †Postligata
  - †Postligata wordeni
- †Praeleda
  - †Praeleda compar
- †Prionochelys
  - †Prionochelys matutina – type locality for species
- †Prognathodon
- †Promathildia
  - †Promathildia parvula – or unidentified comparable form
- †Propenser
  - †Propenser hewletti
- †Protocardia
  - †Protocardia spillmani
- †Protosphyraena
  - †Protosphyraena nitida – tentative report
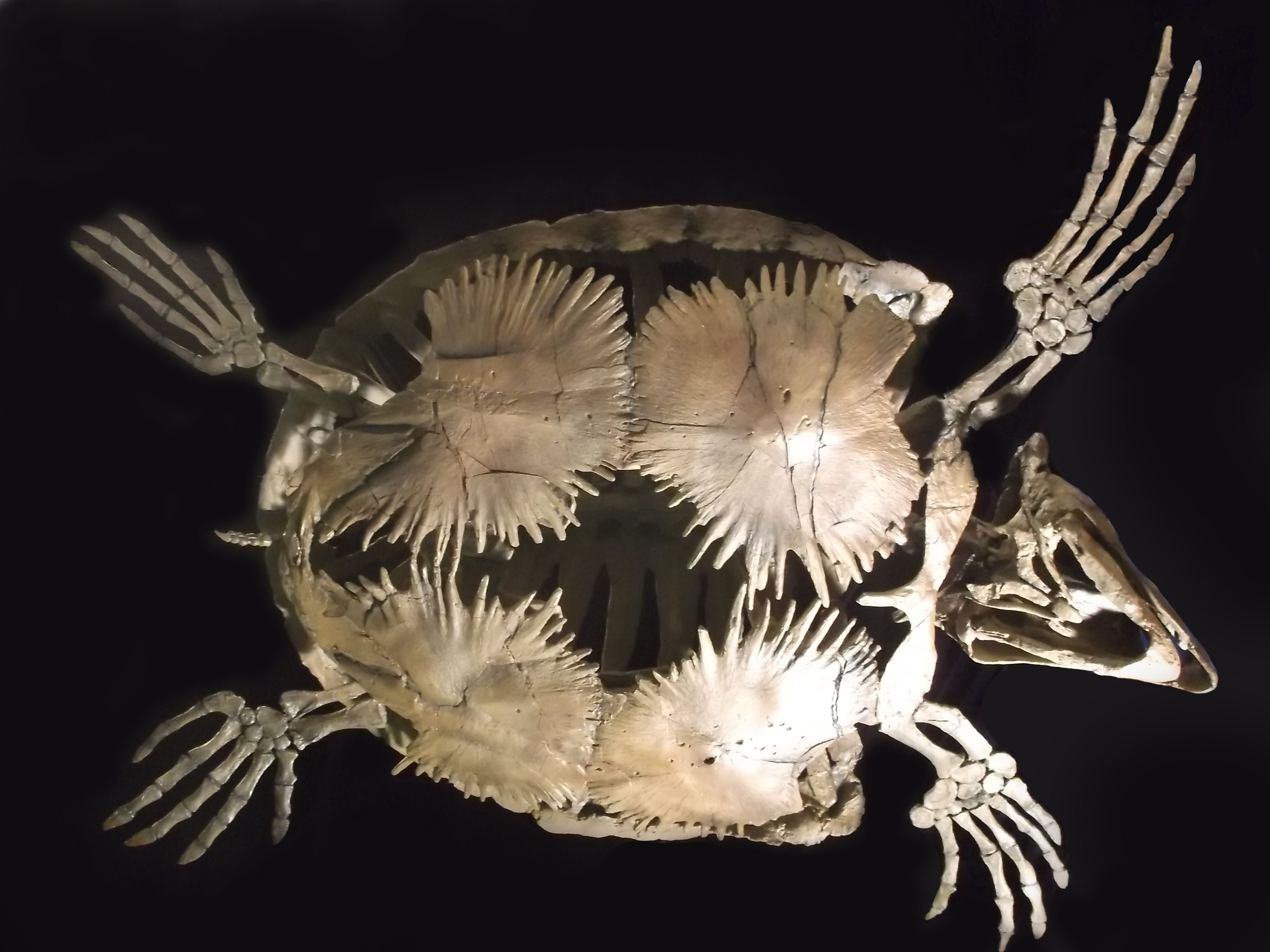
- Mounted fossilized skeleton of the Late Cretaceous sea turtle Protostega
  †Protostega
  - †Protostega dixie – type locality for species
  - †Protostega gigas
- †Pseudocorax
  - †Pseudocorax affinis
  - †Pseudocorax laevis
- †Pseudolimea
  - †Pseudolimea reticulata
  - †Pseudolimea sellardsi
- Pseudomalaxis
  - †Pseudomalaxis pateriformis
  - †Pseudomalaxis pilsbryi
  - †Pseudomalaxis stantoni
- †Pseudomaura
- †Pseudoptera
  - †Pseudoptera securiformis
- †Pseudoschloenbachia
  - †Pseudoschloenbachia mexicana
- †Pseudualimea – tentative report
  - †Pseudualimea reticulata
- †Pteria
  - †Pteria rhombica
- †Pterocerella
  - †Pterocerella tippana
- †Pterotrigonia
  - †Pterotrigonia angulicostata
  - †Pterotrigonia cerulea
  - †Pterotrigonia eufalensis
  - †Pterotrigonia eufaulensis
  - †Pterotrigonia thoracica
- †Ptychodus
  - †Ptychodus mortoni
  - †Ptychodus polygyrus
- †Ptychosyca
  - †Ptychosyca inornata
- †Ptychotrygon
- †Pugnellus
  - †Pugnellus densatus
  - †Pugnellus goldmani
- Pycnodonte
  - †Pycnodonte belli
  - †Pycnodonte mutabilis
  - †Pycnodonte vesicularis
  - †Pycnodonte wratheri
- †Pyncodonte
  - †Pyncodonte mutabilis
- †Pyrifus
- †Pyrifusus
- †Pyropsis
  - †Pyropsis perlata

== Q ==
- †Quadrum
  - †Quadrum gartneri

== R ==
- †Rachiosoma
  - †Rachiosoma mortoni
- †Radiopecten
  - †Radiopecten mississippiensis
- †Rastellum
  - †Rastellum aguilerae
  - †Rastellum falcata
  - †Rastellum mesenterica
- †Remera
  - †Remera flexicostata
- †Remnita
- †Rhombopsis
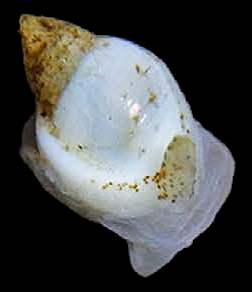
- A living Ringicula sea snail
  Ringicula
  - †Ringicula clarki
  - †Ringicula pulchella
- Rissoina
  - †Rissoina tennesseensis
- Rostellaria – tentative report

== S ==
- †Sargana
  - †Sargana stantoni
- †Saurocephalus
  - †Saurocephalus lanciformis – or unidentified comparable form
- †Saurodon
  - †Saurodon leanus
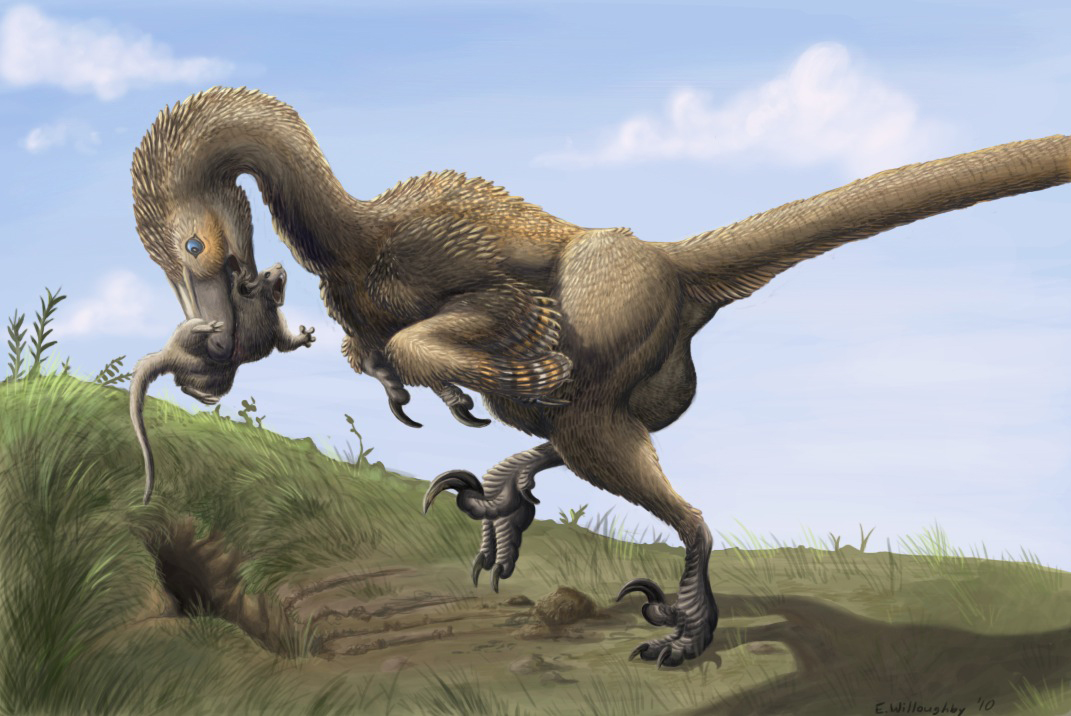
- Life restoration of the Late Cretaceous dromaeosaurid Saurornitholestes preying upon a multituberculate mammal
  †Saurornitholestes – or unidentified comparable form
- †Scambula
  - †Scambula perplana
- †Scapanorhynchus
  - †Scapanorhynchus rapax
  - †Scapanorhynchus rhaphiodon
- †Scaphites
- †Schizobasis
- †Scobinidola
  - †Scobinidola guttatus
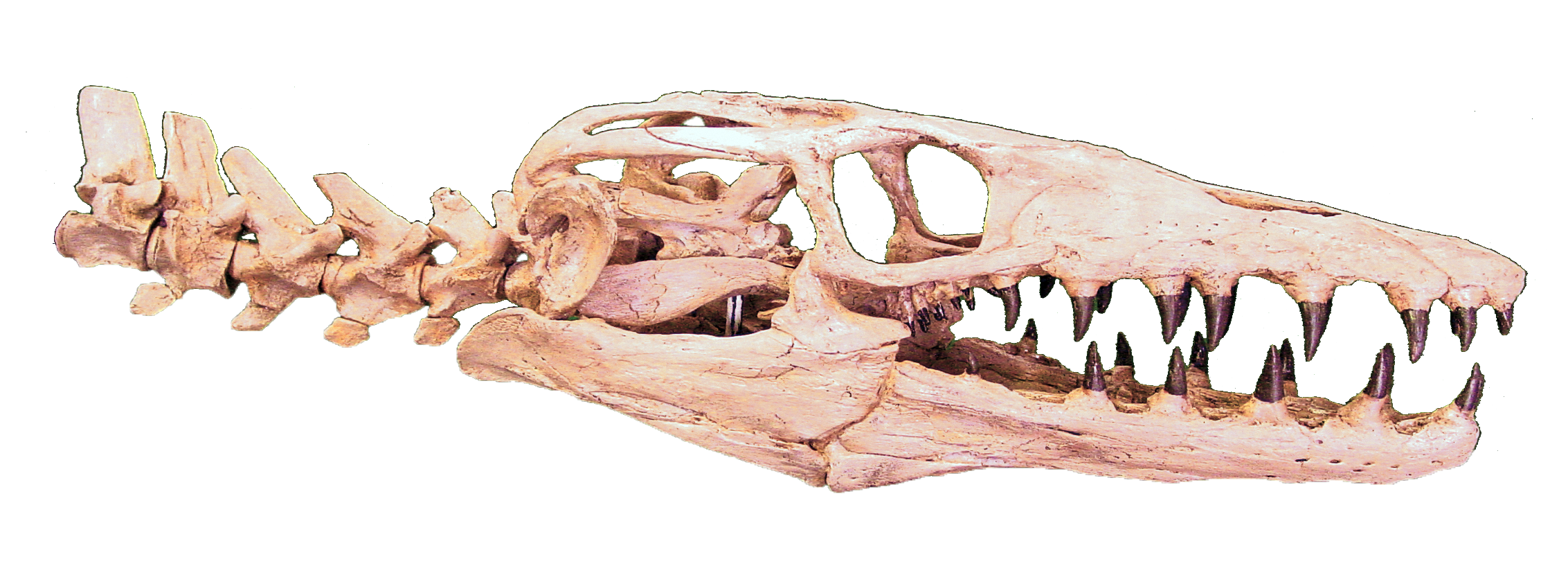
- Mounted fossilized skull and neck of the Late Cretaceous mosasaur Selmasaurus
  †Selmasaurus – type locality for genus
  - †Selmasaurus russelli – type locality for species
- Serpula
  - †Serpula adnata – tentative report
  - †Serpula cretacea
- †Serpulus
- Solemya
- †Solenoceras
- †Solida
- †Solyma
  - †Solyma elliptica – or unidentified related form
- †Sourimis
  - †Sourimis georgiana – tentative report
- †Sphenodiscus
  - †Sphenodiscus lobatus
  - †Sphenodiscus pleurisepta
- †Spirorbula
- Spondylus
  - †Spondylus gregalis
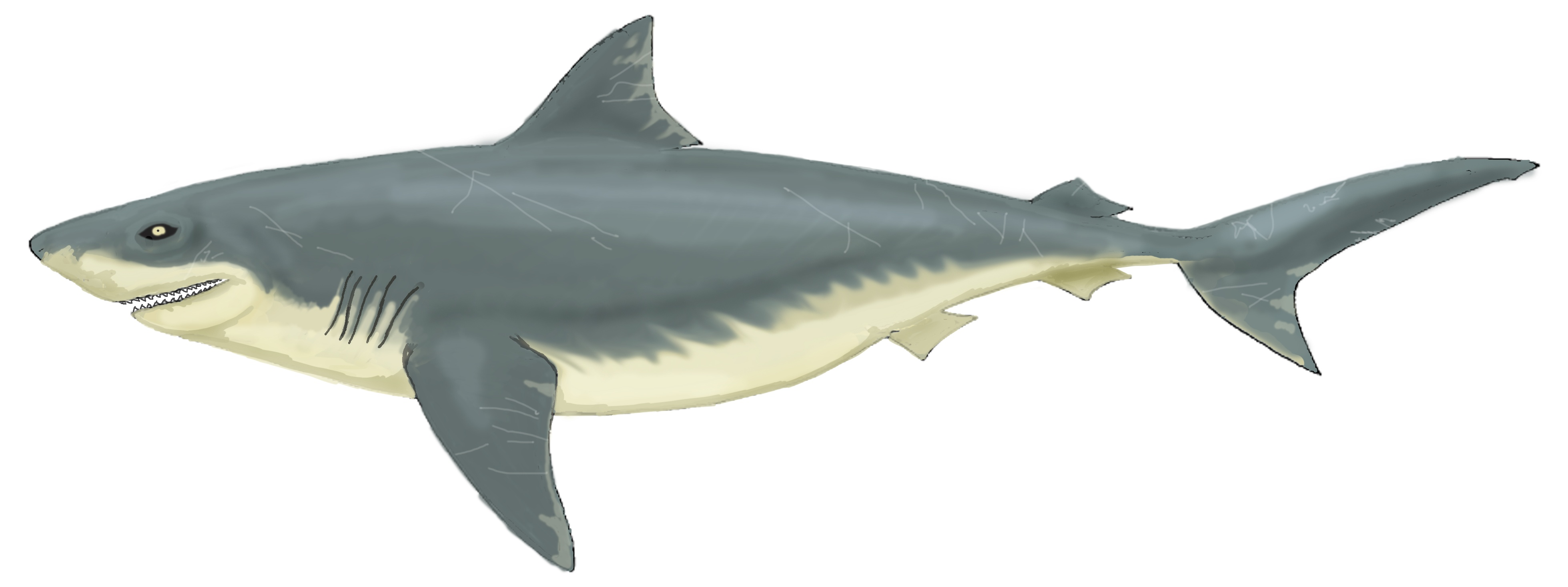
- Life restoration of the Late Cretaceous shark Squalicorax
  Squalicorax
  - †Squalicorax falcatus
  - †Squalicorax pristodontus
- †Stantonella
  - †Stantonella interrupta
- †Stenocyathus
  - †Stenocyathus alabamiensis – type locality for species
- †Stenzeloceras – type locality for genus
  - †Stenzeloceras sinuosum – type locality for species
- †Stephanophyllia
  - †Stephanophyllia cribraria
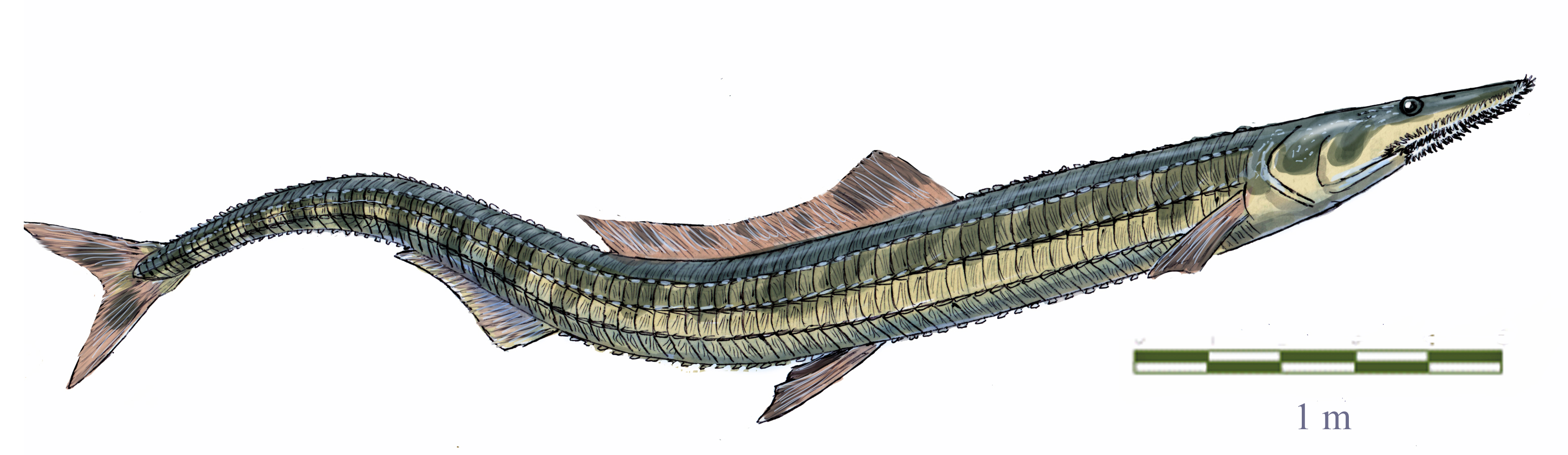
- Life restoration of the Cretaceous bony fish Stratodus
  †Stratodus
  - †Stratodus apicalis
- Striarca
  - †Striarca cuneata
  - †Striarca prebrevis
  - †Striarca saffordi
- †Striaticostatum
  - †Striaticostatum asperum
  - †Striaticostatum sparsum
- Sulcoretusa
- †Syncyclonema
  - †Syncyclonema kingi
  - †Syncyclonema simplicius

== T ==
- Teinostoma
- Tellina
  - †Tellina marcosensis
  - †Tellina munda
- †Tellinimera
  - †Tellinimera buboana
  - †Tellinimera gabbi
- †Tenea
  - †Tenea parilis
- †Tenuipteria
  - †Tenuipteria argentea
  - †Tenuipteria argenteus
- Terebratulina
  - †Terebratulina floridana
- Teredo
- †Thalassinoides
- †Thinochelys
  - †Thinochelys lapisossea – type locality for species
- †Thylacus
  - †Thylacus cretacea
  - †Thylacus cretaceus
- †Tintorium
- †Titanosarcolites
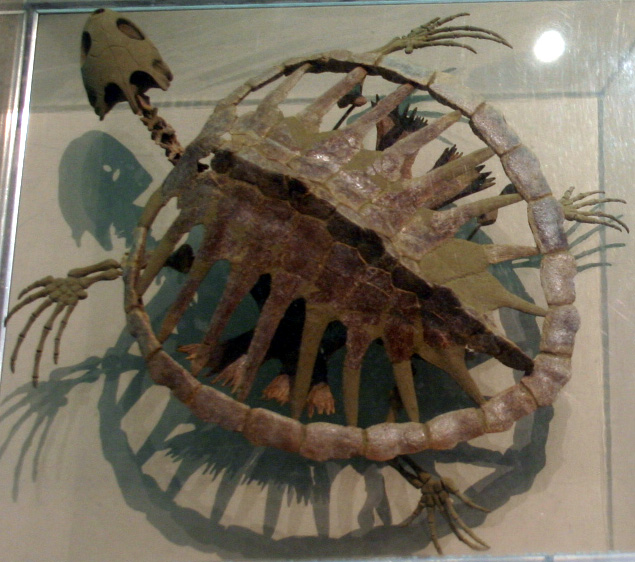
- Mounted fossilized skeleton of the Late Cretaceous sea turtle Toxochelys
  †Toxochelys
  - †Toxochelys moorevillensis – type locality for species
- †Trachybaculites
  - †Trachybaculites columna
- Trachycardium
  - †Trachycardium efaulense
  - †Trachycardium eufaulense
  - †Trachycardium eufaulensis
- †Trigonarca
  - †Trigonarca inflata
- Trochocyathus – tentative report
- Turboella
- Turritella
  - †Turritella bilira
  - †Turritella chalybeatensis
  - †Turritella forgemoli – or unidentified comparable form
  - †Turritella hilgardi
  - †Turritella paravertebroides
  - †Turritella tippana
  - †Turritella trilira
  - †Turritella vertebroides
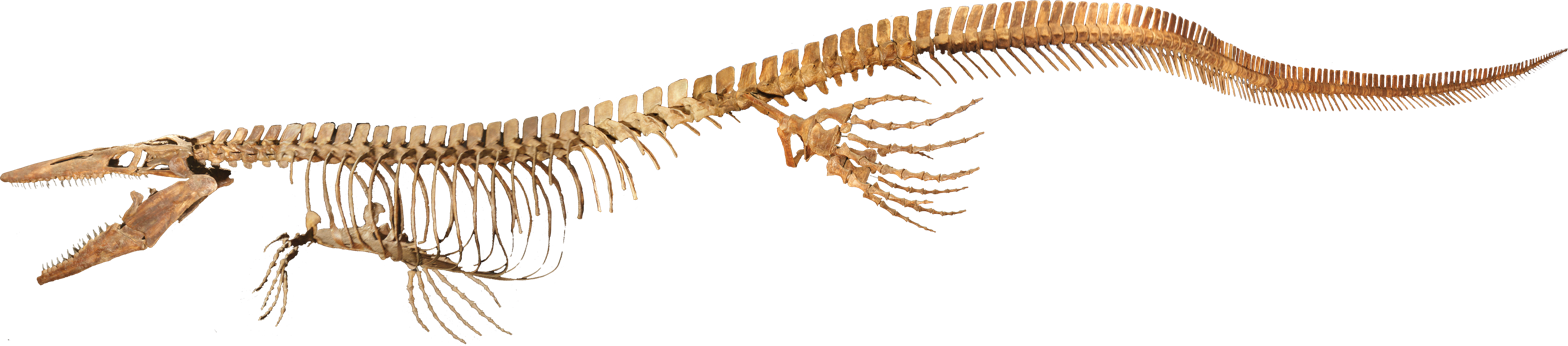
- Mounted fossilized skeleton of the Late Cretaceous mosasaur Tylosaurus
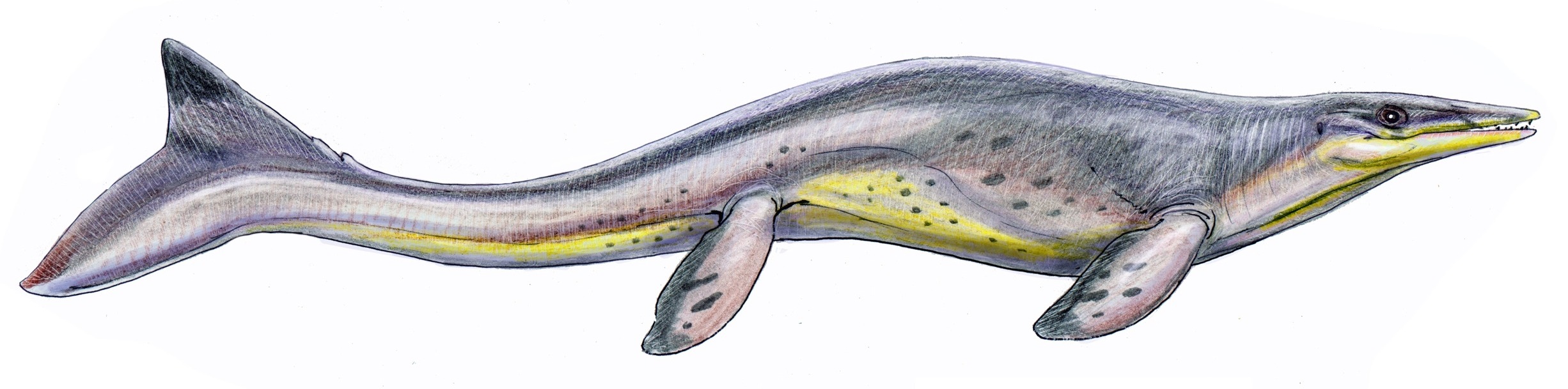
  Restoration of the Late Cretaceous mosasaur Tylosaurus
  †Tylosaurus
  - †Tylosaurus zangerli

== U ==
- †Uddenia
- †Unicardium
  - †Unicardium concentricum
- †Urceolabrum
  - †Urceolabrum tuberculatum

== V ==
- †Veniella
  - †Veniella conradi
- †Vetericardiella
  - †Vetericardiella crenalirata
  - †Vetericardiella webbervillensis
- †Volutomorpha
  - †Volutomorpha aspera
  - †Volutomorpha mutabilis – or unidentified related form

== W ==
- †Weeksia
  - †Weeksia amplificata
  - †Weeksia deplanata

== X ==
- Xenophora
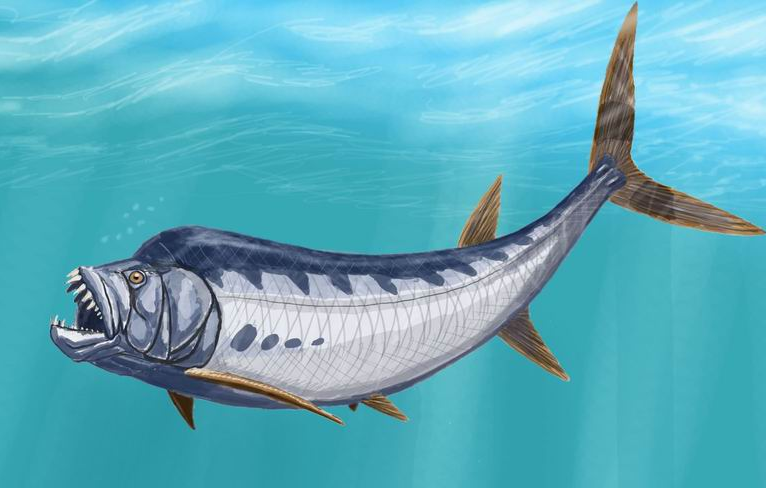
- Life restoration of the Cretaceous bony fish Xiphactinus
  †Xiphactinus
  - †Xiphactinus audax
