= Canua =

Canua may refer to:

- the ancient name for the city of Cannes
- an alternate spelling of Cana, a Coahuiltecan tribe
- a taxonomic synonym for Antropora, a genus of bryozoans
