= Botula kleemanni =

Scientific classification
- Kingdom: Animalia
- Phylum: Mollusca
- Class: Bivalvia
- Order: Mytilida
- Family: Mytilidae
- Genus: Botula
- Species: B. kleemanni

Binomial name
- Botula kleemanni Valentich-Scott, 2008

Species of bivalve

Botula kleemanni is a species of bivalve in the family Mytilidae. The scientific name of the species was first validly published in 2008 by Valentich-Scott.
