= Botula cylista =

Scientific classification
- Kingdom: Animalia
- Phylum: Mollusca
- Class: Bivalvia
- Order: Mytilida
- Family: Mytilidae
- Genus: Botula
- Species: B. cylista

Binomial name
- Botula cylista Berry, 1959

Species of bivalve

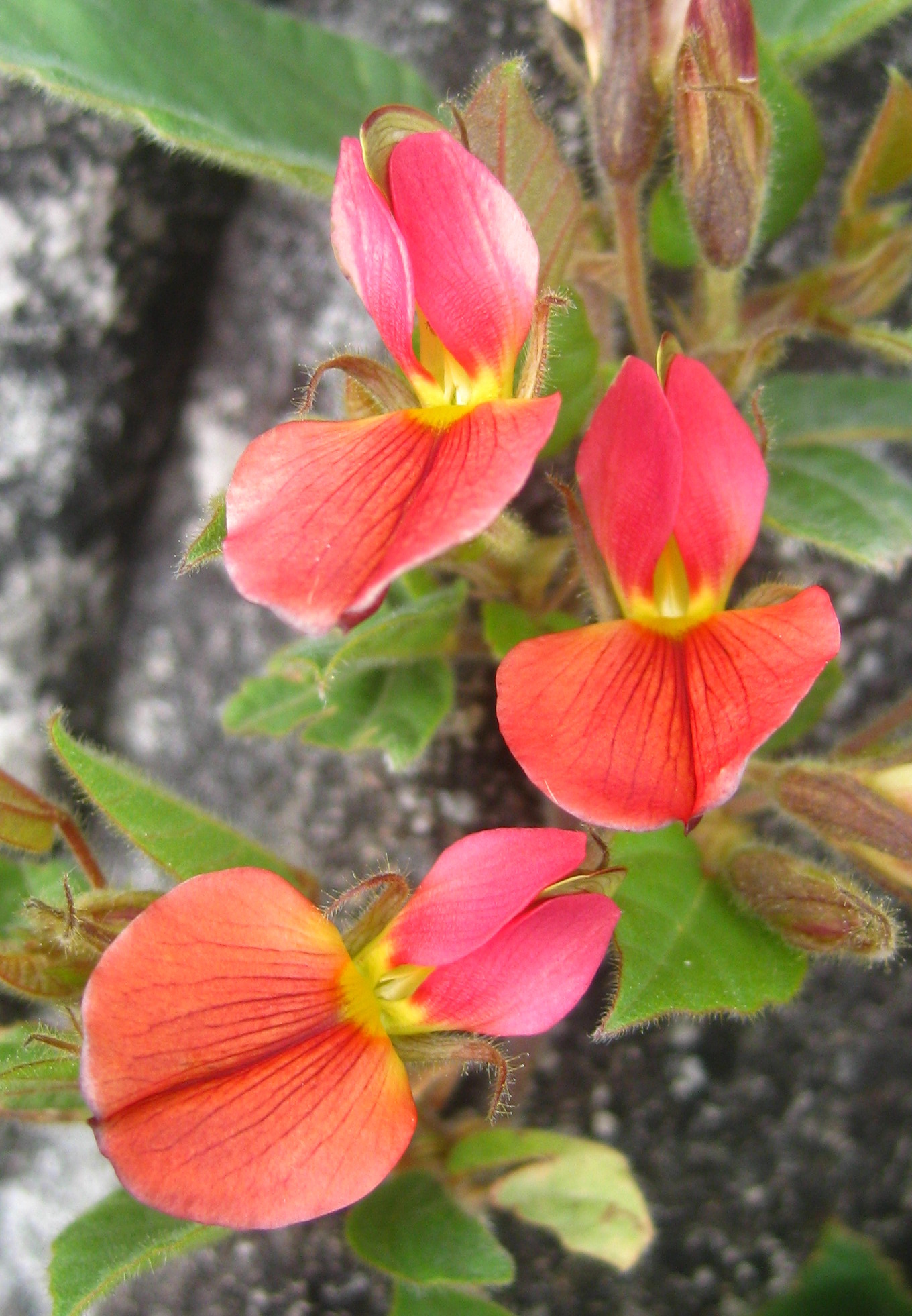
Fire pea or Rhynchosia monophylla (sub-family Papilionoideae) Tsetserra

Botula cylista is a species of bivalve in the family Mytilidae. The scientific name of the species was first validly published in 1959 by S. S. Berry.
