= Botula hawaiensis =

Scientific classification
- Kingdom: Animalia
- Phylum: Mollusca
- Class: Bivalvia
- Order: Mytilida
- Family: Mytilidae
- Genus: Botula
- Species: B. hawaiensis

Binomial name
- Botula hawaiensis Dall, Bartsch & Rehder, 1938

Species of bivalve

Botula hawaiensis is a species of bivalve in the family Mytilidae. The scientific name of the species was first validly published in 1938 by Dall, Bartsch & Rehder.
