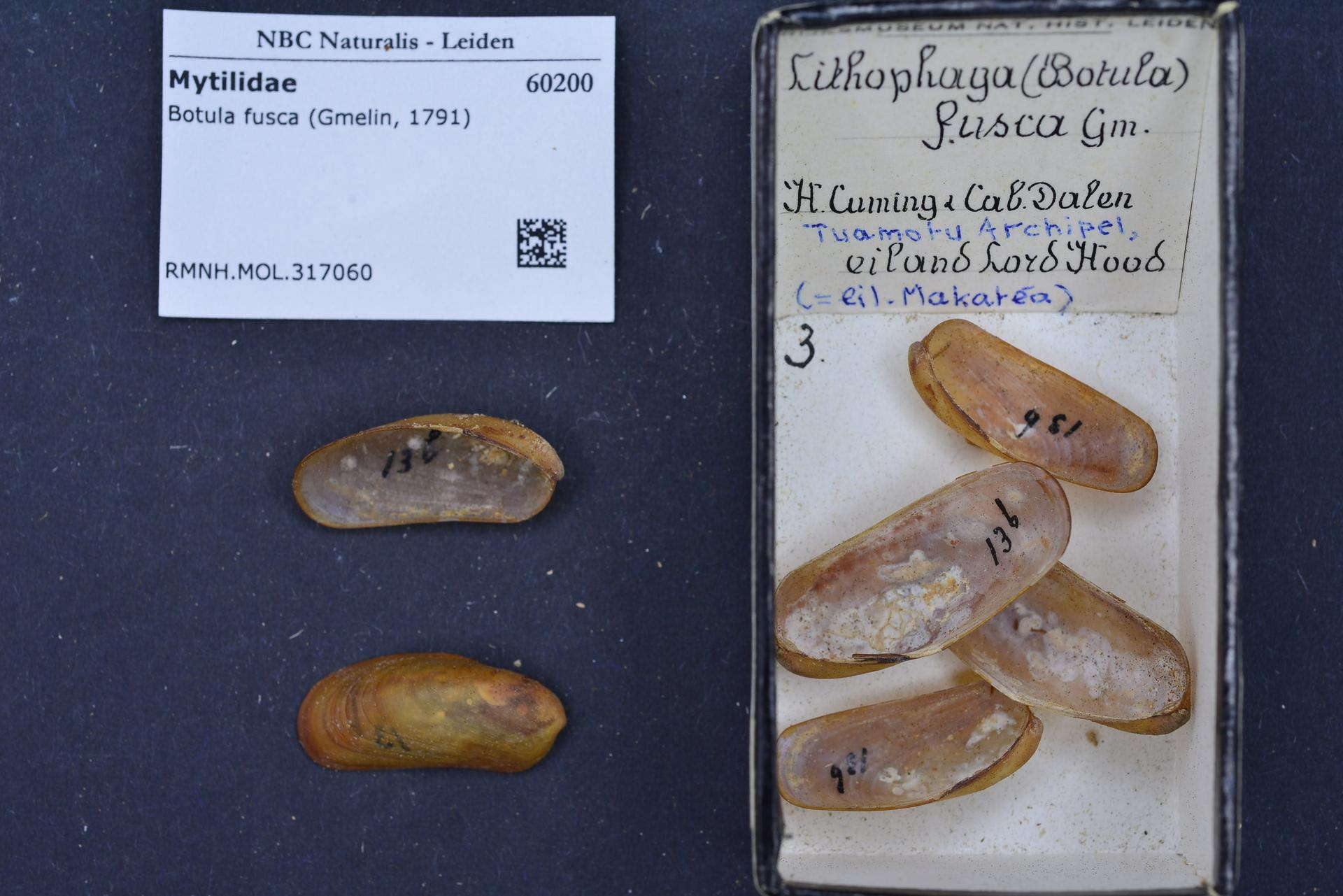

Scientific classification
- Kingdom: Animalia
- Phylum: Mollusca
- Class: Bivalvia
- Order: Mytilida
- Family: Mytilidae
- Genus: Botula
- Species: B. fusca

Binomial name
- Botula fusca (Gmelin, 1791)

= Botula fusca =

Species of bivalve

Botula fusca, or the Cinnamon mussel, is a species of bivalve mollusc in the family Mytilidae. It can be found along the Atlantic coast of North America, ranging from North Carolina to the West Indies and Bermuda.
