= Botula tatei =

Scientific classification
- Kingdom: Animalia
- Phylum: Mollusca
- Class: Bivalvia
- Order: Mytilida
- Family: Mytilidae
- Genus: Botula
- Species: B. tatei

Binomial name
- Botula tatei Huber, 2010

Species of bivalve

Botula tatei is a species of bivalve in the family Mytilidae. The scientific name of the species was first validly published in 2010 by Huber.
