= Antroporidae =

Scientific classification
- Kingdom: Animalia
- Phylum: Bryozoa
- Class: Gymnolaemata
- Order: Cheilostomatida
- Suborder: Flustrina
- Superfamily: Calloporoidea
- Family: Antroporidae; Vigneaux, 1949

Synonyms
- Akatoporidae Levinsen, 1909

Family of bryozoans

Antroporidae is a family of bryozoans belonging to the order Cheilostomatida.

== Genera ==
The following genera are recognised in the family Antroporidae:

- Akatopora Davis, 1934
- Antropora Norman, 1903
- Ellisantropora Gordon, 2021
- †Lateroflustrella d'Orbigny, 1853
- Parantropora Tilbrook, 1998
- Rosseliana Jullien, 1888
- †Samudraka Guha, 1989
