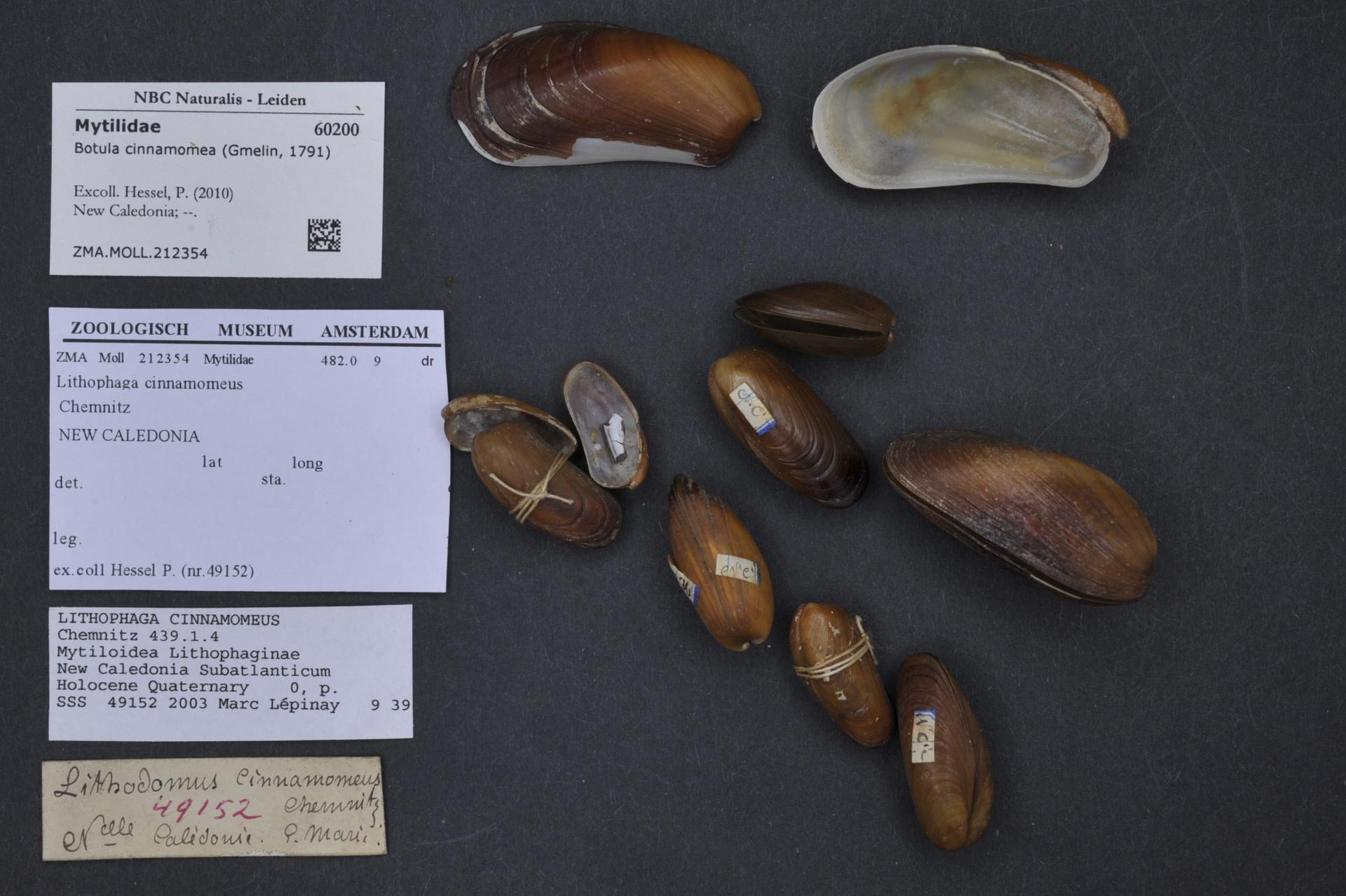

Scientific classification
- Kingdom: Animalia
- Phylum: Mollusca
- Class: Bivalvia
- Order: Mytilida
- Family: Mytilidae
- Genus: Botula
- Species: B. cinnamomea

Binomial name
- Botula cinnamomea Gmelin, 1791

= Botula cinnamomea =

Species of bivalve

Botula cinnamomea, the boring horse mussel, is a species of bivalve in the family Mytilidae. The scientific name of the species was first validly published in 1791 by Johann Friedrich Gmelin.
