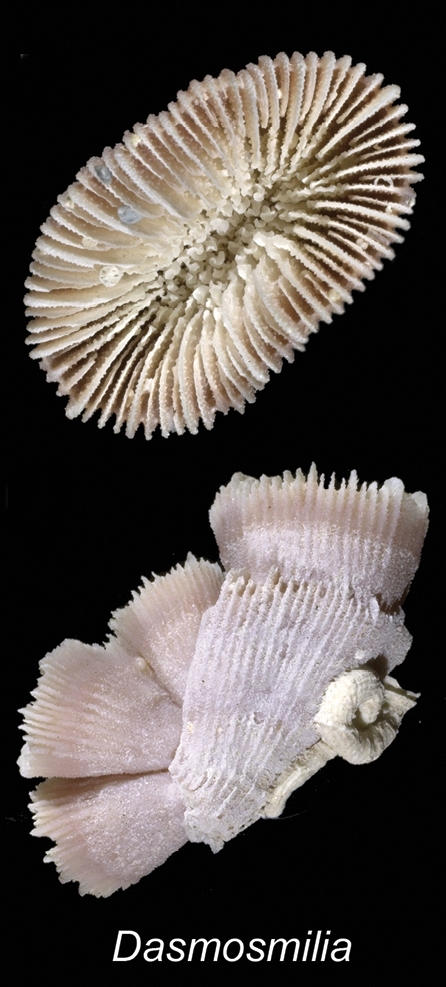
- Dasmosmilia lymani

Scientific classification
- Kingdom: Animalia
- Phylum: Cnidaria
- Subphylum: Anthozoa
- Class: Hexacorallia
- Order: Scleractinia
- Family: Caryophylliidae
- Genus: Dasmosmilia; Pourtalès, 1880

Species
- See text

Synonyms
- Dasosmilia [lapsus]; Goniocyathus Yabe & Eguchi, 1932

= Dasmosmilia =

Genus of corals

Dasmosmilia is a genus of small corals in the family Caryophylliidae.

== Species ==
The World Register of Marine Species includes the following species in the genus:

- Dasmosmilia lymani (Pourtalès, 1871)
- Dasmosmilia variegata (Pourtalès, 1871)
