= Botula =

Scientific classification
- Kingdom: Animalia
- Phylum: Mollusca
- Class: Bivalvia
- Order: Mytilida
- Family: Mytilidae
- Genus: Botula; Morch, 1853

Genus of bivalves

Botula is a genus of mussels in the family Mytilidae.

== Selected species ==
- Botula cinnamomea (Gmelin, 1791) — boring horse mussel
- Botula cylista Berry, 1959
- Botula fusca (Gmelin, 1791) — cinnamon mussel
- Botula hawaiensis Dall, Bartsch & Rehder, 1938
- Botula kleemanni Valentich-Scott, 2008
- Botula tatei M. Huber, 2010
