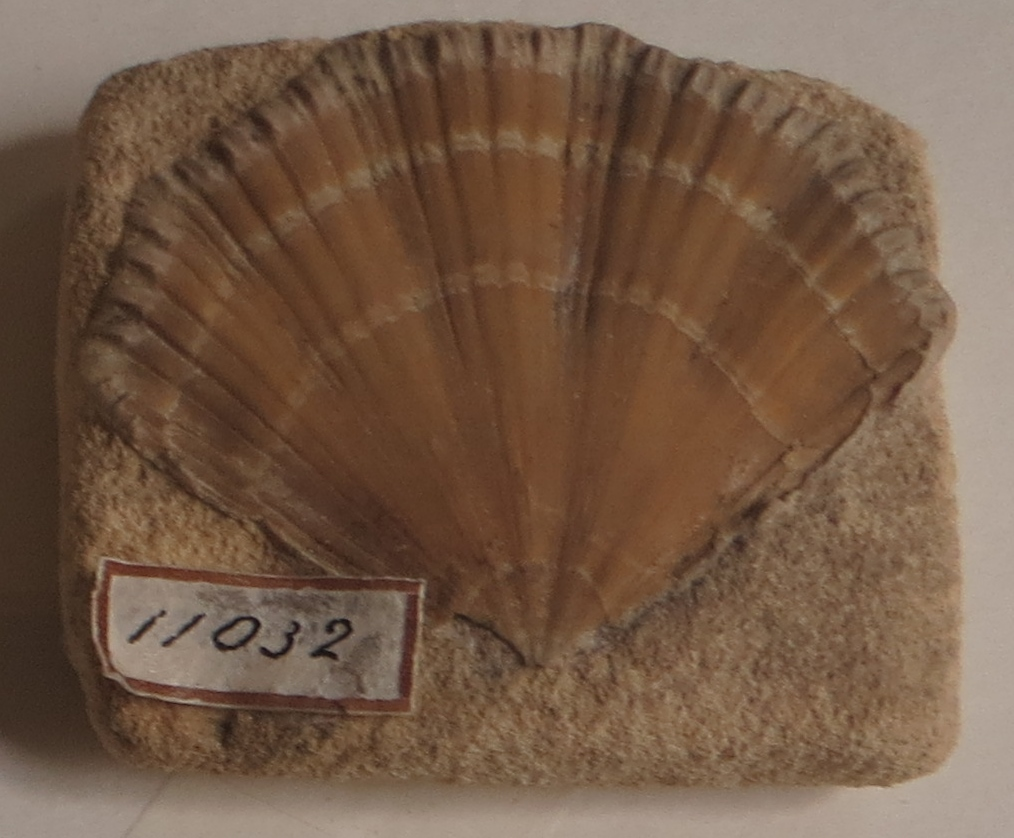
- Fossil of Neithea striatocostata located at the Teylers Museum, Haarlem.

Scientific classification
- Kingdom: Animalia
- Phylum: Mollusca
- Class: Bivalvia
- Order: Pectinida
- Family: †Neitheidae
- Genus: †Neithea; Meek, 1864

= Neithea =

Neithea Temporal range: Early Jurassic - early Paleocene

Extinct genus of bivalves

Neithea is an extinct genus of bivalve molluscs that lived from the Early Jurassic to the early Paleocene, with a worldwide distribution. Neithia sp. are inequivalve. That means that the two valves are not the same shape, the right valve being strongly concave and the left valve being flattened or concave. Sculpture consist of alternating strong and weaker radiating ribs.

== Selected species ==
- Neithea alpina
- Neithea atava
- Neithea biangulata
- Neithea coquandi
- Neithea gibbosa
- Neithea hispanica
- Neithea irregularis
- Neithea morrisi
- Neithea sexcostata
- Neithea striatocostata
