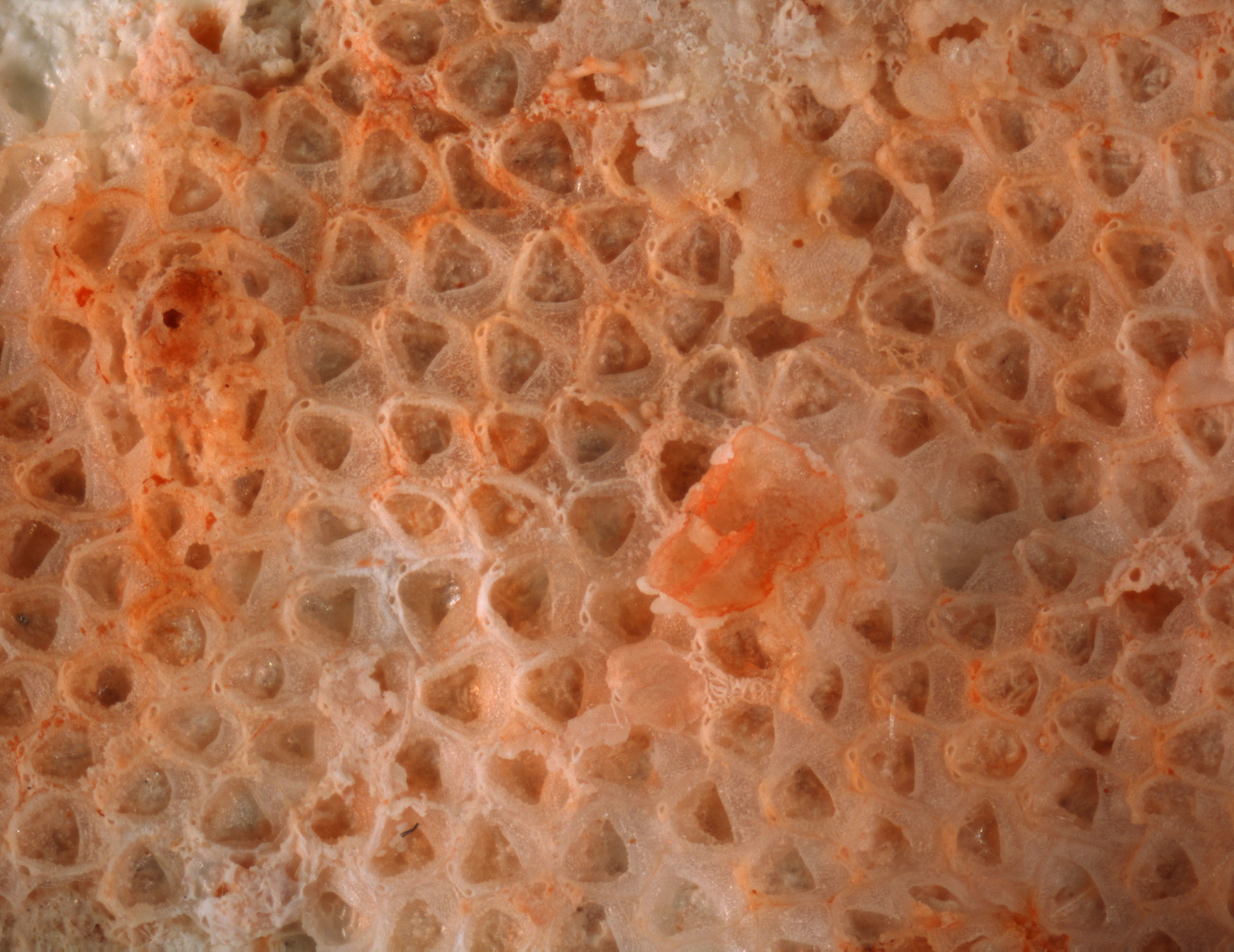
- Antropora granulifera

Scientific classification
- Kingdom: Animalia
- Phylum: Bryozoa
- Class: Gymnolaemata
- Order: Cheilostomatida
- Family: Antroporidae
- Genus: Antropora; Norman, 1903

Synonyms
- Canua Davis, 1934; Dacryonella Canu & Bassler, 1917; Membrendoecium Canu & Bassler, 1917

= Antropora =

Genus of bryozoans

Antropora is a genus of bryozoans belonging to the family Antroporidae.

The genus has an almost cosmopolitan distribution.

== Species ==
The following species are recognised in the genus Antropora:

- Antropora absidata Winston & Jackson, 2021
- Antropora acicularis Winston & Jackson, 2021
- †Antropora ampla (Tenison-Woods, 1880)
- †Antropora arborescens (Canu & Bassler, 1920)
- †Antropora biglobosa (Uttley, 1951)
- Antropora commandorica Tilbrook & Grischenko, 2004
- Antropora compressa (Osburn, 1927)
- Antropora cruzeiro Ramalho & Moraes, 2021
- Antropora curvirostris Winston & Jackson, 2021
- †Antropora daishakaensis Kataoka, 1957
- †Antropora duplex (Canu & Bassler, 1920)
- †Antropora elliptica Canu & Bassler, 1932
- †Antropora elongata Kataoka, 1957
- Antropora erecta (Canu & Bassler, 1920)
- Antropora erecta Silén, 1941
- Antropora erectirostra Tilbrook, 1998
- Antropora fenglingiana Liu, 1982
- †Antropora forata (Uttley, 1951)
- †Antropora gadhavii Guha & Gopikrishna, 2005
- Antropora gemarita Ramalho & López-Fé, 2020
- Antropora granulifera (Hincks, 1880)
- †Antropora guajirensis Flórez, Di Martino & Ramalho, 2021
- Antropora hastata Winston, Vieira & Woollacott, 2014
- †Antropora hataii Kataoka, 1957
- †Antropora lecointrei Buge, 1966
- Antropora levigata (Canu & Bassler, 1927)
- †Antropora lowei (Canu & Bassler, 1920)
- Antropora minor (Hincks, 1880)
- †Antropora minuta (Bassler, 1936)
- †Antropora navalis (Davis, 1934)
- †Antropora octonaria (Canu & Bassler, 1917)
- †Antropora oculifera (Canu & Bassler, 1929)
- †Antropora ogivalis (Duvergier, 1921)
- †Antropora parvicapitata (Canu & Bassler, 1923)
- Antropora paucicryptocysta Moyano, 1983
- †Antropora pyriformis (Canu & Bassler, 1917)
- †Antropora ramaniaensis (Sonar & Pawar & Wayal, 2022)
- †Antropora striata (Kühn, 1930)
- Antropora subvespertilio (Canu & Bassler, 1929)
- †Antropora transversa (Canu & Bassler, 1920)
- Antropora typica (Canu & Bassler, 1928)
