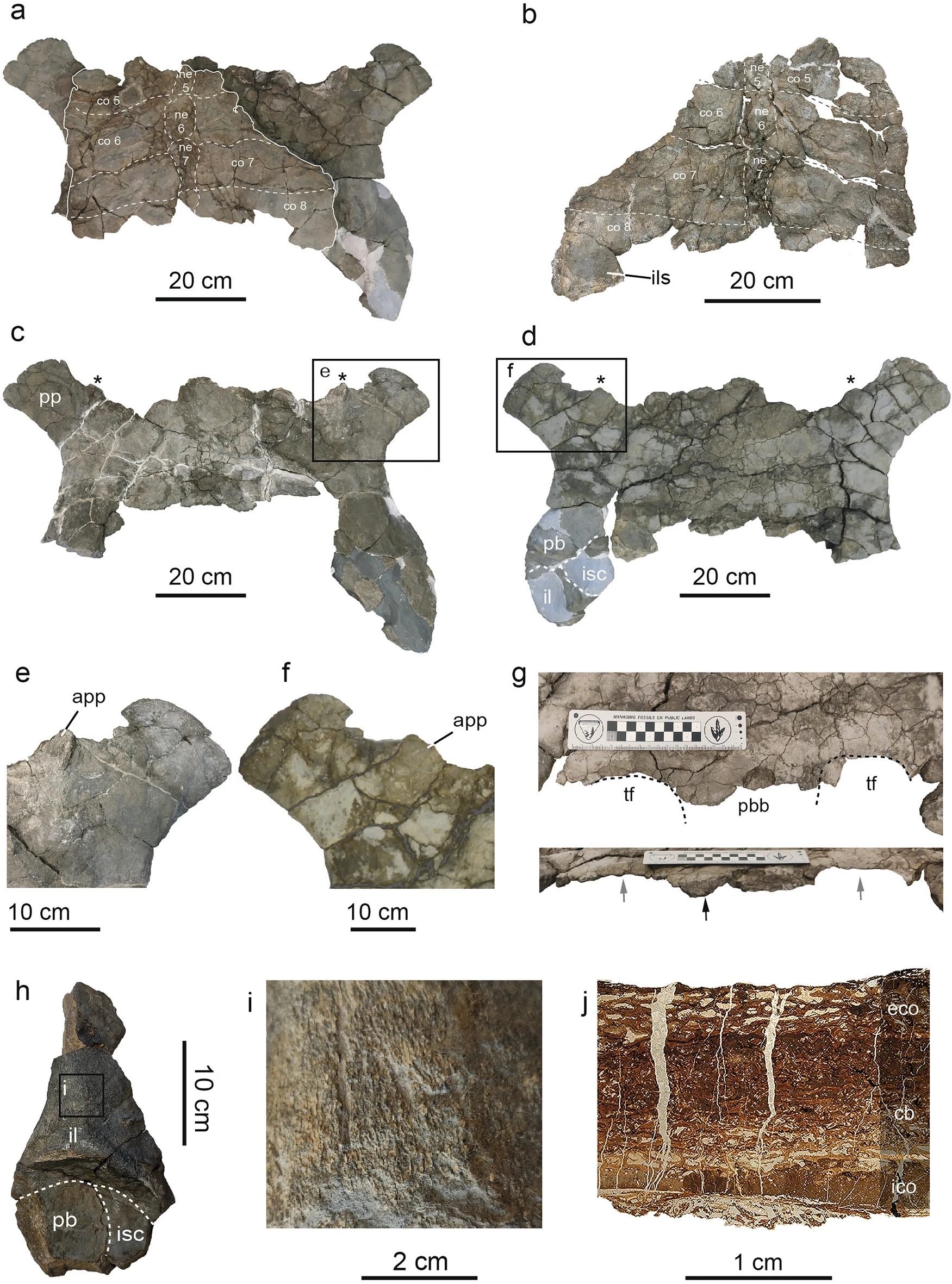
- Type material of Leviathanochelys

Scientific classification
- Kingdom: Animalia
- Phylum: Chordata
- Class: Reptilia
- Order: Testudines
- Suborder: Cryptodira
- Superfamily: Chelonioidea
- Genus: †Leviathanochelys; Castillo-Visa et al., 2022
- Species: †L. aenigmatica

Binomial name
- †Leviathanochelys aenigmatica Castillo-Visa et al., 2022

= Leviathanochelys =

Leviathanochelys Temporal range: Campanian

Extinct genus of turtle

Leviathanochelys is an extinct genus of giant sea turtle from the Middle Campanian of northern Spain. Although only known from the rear end of the carapace and the connecting pubic bones, these elements clearly show that they belonged to a turtle of great size, comparable in dimensions to the giant Archelon and Protostega from the Western Interior Seaway of the USA. This makes Leviathanochelys the first giant sea turtle known from Europe and one of the largest known turtles of all time. This great size was evolved independently from the American protostegid turtles and was likely an adaptation to the conditions of the Cretaceous oceans covering much of Europe. Being classified in the superfamily Chelonioidea, Leviathanochelys is likely more closely related to modern sea turtles (families Dermochelyidae and Cheloniidae) than the protostegids, which are thought to be more basal and have a more uncertain relationship to modern sea turtles. Leviathanochelys is thought to have been a pelagic animal. The genus contains a single species, Leviathanochelys aenigmatica.

== Discovery and naming ==
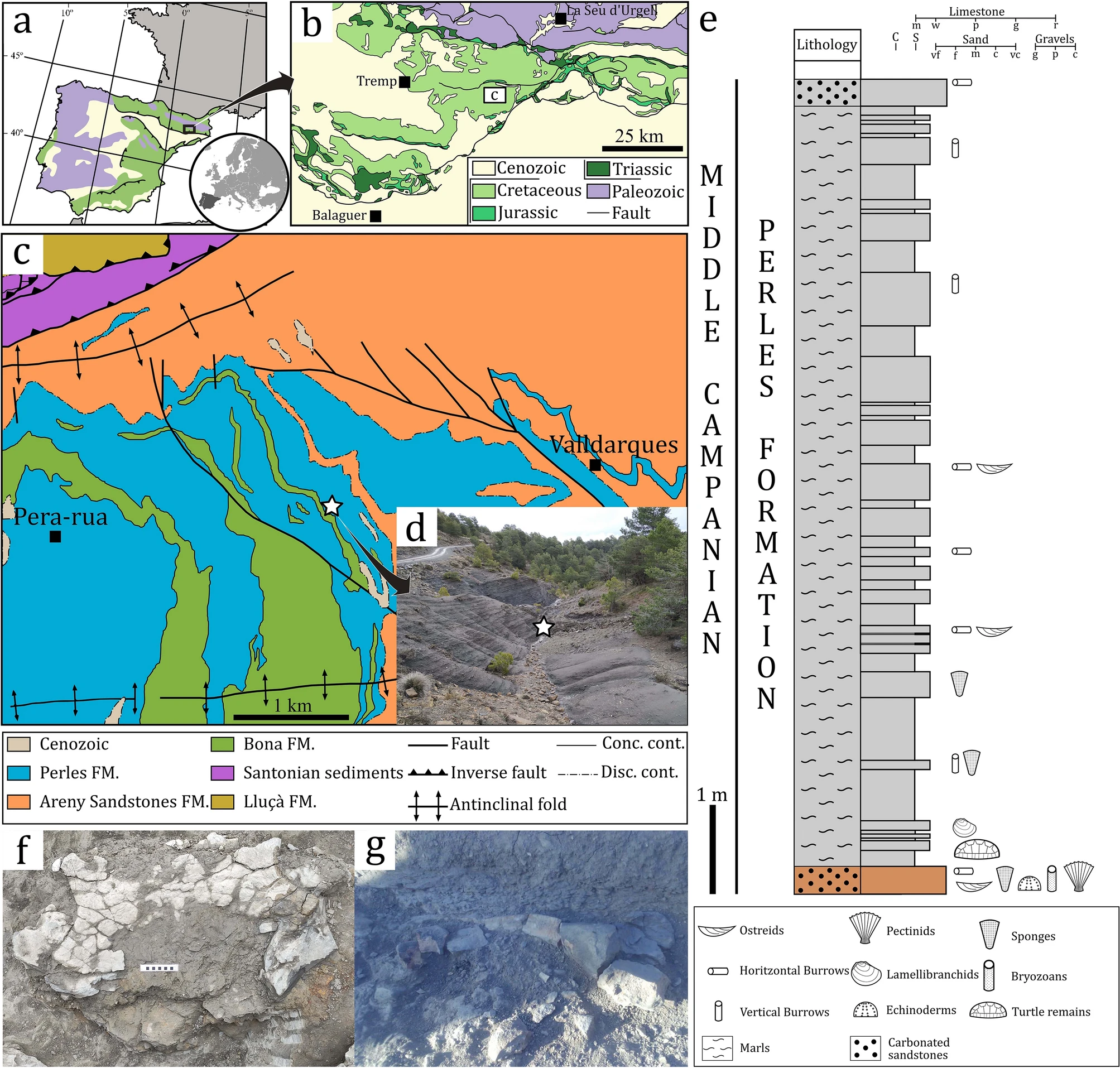
Map of the Cal Torrades Locality and stratigraphy of the Perles formation

The remains of Leviathanochelys were discovered in 2016 by a hiker at the Cal Torrades locality in the Spanish Pyrenees, which corresponds with the lower Perles Formation. Within this locality, the fossil material was discovered approximately 20 cm (7.9 in) above the sandstone that forms the base of the locality, within a layer of grey marls. The turtle was named based on the holotype specimen MCD9884, which represents the posterior end of the animal's shell including the 5th to 8th neural and costal plates, an almost unidentifiable bone thought to be a vertebra and much of the pelvic girdle including both pubis, ischia and ilia.

The name Leviathanochelys is an allusion to the biblical leviathan, a massive marine beast that was chosen due to the turtle's great size. The second part of the genus name is chelys, a Latinized version of the Greek χέλυς (khélūs) for turtle. The species name aenigmatica is likewise Latinized Greek, deriving from αἴνιγμα (aínigma) meaning enigma, due to the anatomy of the fossil material.

== Description ==
The carapace of Leviathanochelys is only known from the 5th neural and costal plates onward but clearly shows a smooth, slightly convex surface. The preserved plates show no marks left by scutes and there appear to be no ridges or depressions on the plates either. The costal plates, which are the large plates of the carapace located on either side of the spine, are wider than they are long and subrectangular in shape. The neural plates which run down the center of the carapace are only poorly preserved, with the first and last of the present bones (corresponding to the 5th and 8th plate in an intact shell) being incomplete. The 6th is the largest of the neural series and shaped like an octagon, while the 7th is reduced towards its end and hexagonal.

The pelvis is flat and H-shaped, clearly setting it apart from sea turtles like Toxochelys, with both pubes being fused to one another. The front sides of the pelvis bear a unique accessory process that, based on the structures surface, likely connected to musculature. This trait is exclusive to Leviathanochelys and not observed in any other sea turtle, extant or extinct. Generally, several important muscles attach to the pelvis in sea turtles, with its anterior side specifically connecting to the Rectus abdominis muscle and the musculus puboischiofemoralis. While the former stabilizes the pubis and aids in breathing while the later is tied to the movement of the hindlimbs. Castillo-Visa and colleagues argue that the position of the accessory process and the lack of muscle scars make it unlikely that it was connected to mobility and instead propose that aided in respiration.

Leviathanochelys has been noted for its massive size, with the pelvis alone reaching a width of 88.9 cm (35.0 in), which is larger than the same bones in the giant Archelon with a width of 81 cm (32 in). The length of the pelvis is likewise enormous. With a pelvic length of 39.5 cm (15.6 in) it is over 100% longer than that of Protostega (18 cm (7.1 in)) and only slightly shorter than that of Archelon (46 cm (18 in)). Although there is no direct way of calculating total body length from the dimensions of the pelvis alone, these measurements indicate that Leviathanochelys could reach similar proportions as these giant protostegids, with the authors suggesting a potential body length of 3.74 m (12.3 ft).

== Phylogeny ==
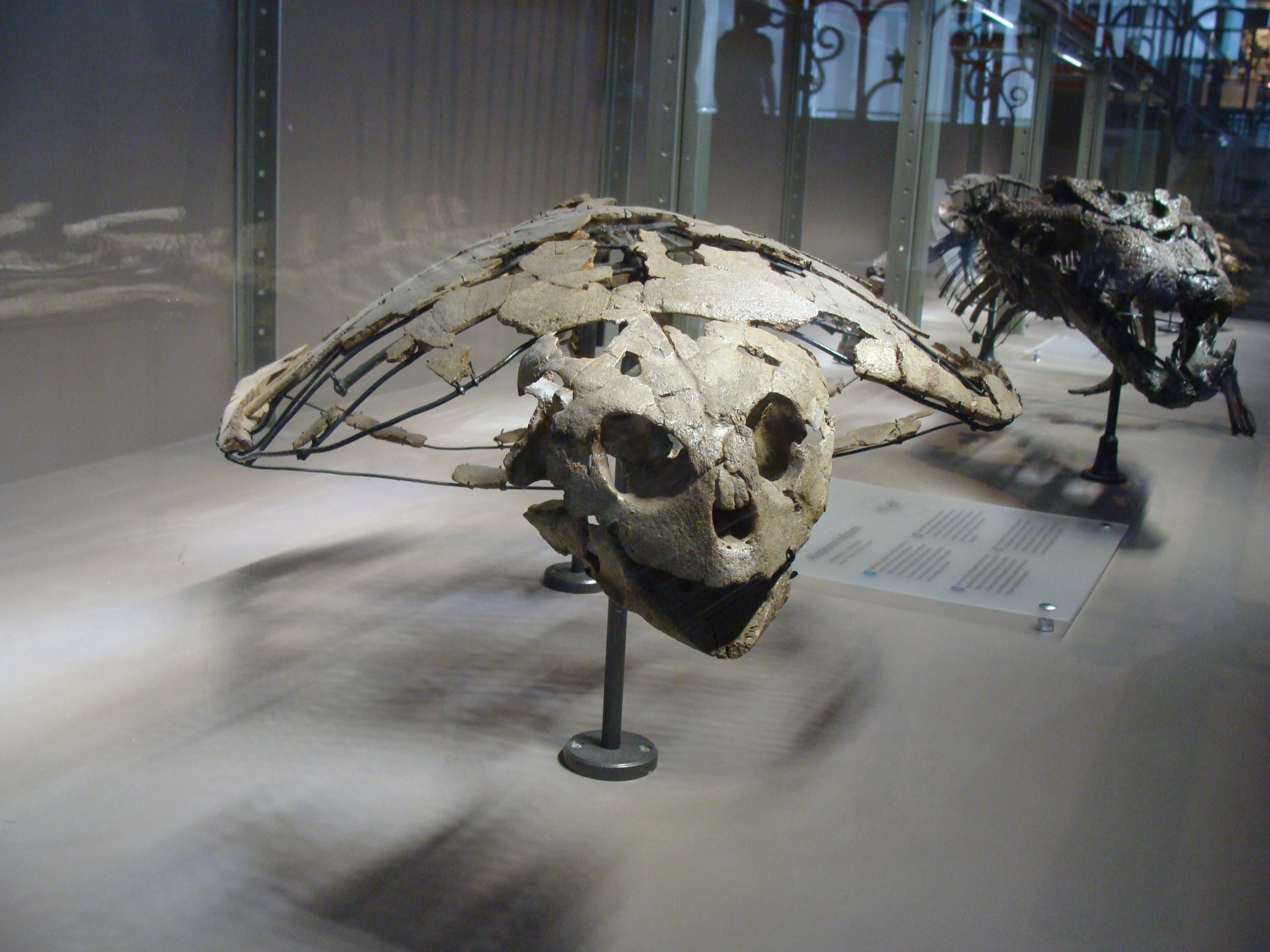
The closest relative of Leviathanochelys was Allopleuron

Phylogenetic analysis recovered Leviathanochelys as a basal member of the sea turtle superfamily Chelonioidea, specifically a sister taxon of the Maastrichtian Allopleuron hoffmanni. However Castillo-Visa and colleagues note that this grouping is only supported by a single common synapomorphy, the fact that the pelvis is connected to the shell not through a bony suture but through ligaments. This causes further problems, as this is the state for a large number of turtles and subsequently highly plesiomorphic. The placement of both these taxa within Chelonioidea is however supported by several other traits.

- Chelonioidea
  - Dermochelydae
    - † Eosphargis breineri
    - Leatherback sea turtle (Dermochelys coriacea)
  - - † Nichollsemys baieri
    - - - † Leviathanochelys aenigmatica
        - † Allopleuron hoffmanni
      - - † Procolpochelys charlestonensis
        - - † Argillochelys cuneiceps
          - - † Eochelone brabantica
            - † Puppigerus camperi
          - Ctenochelydae
            - † Cabindachelys landanensis
            - † Ctenochelys sp.
            - † Peritresius martini
          - Cheloniidae
            - Australian flatback sea turtle (Natator depressus)
            - Hawksbill sea turtle (Eretmochelys imbricata)
            - Green sea turtle (Chelonia mydas)
            - - Kemp's ridley sea turtle (Lepidochelys kempii)
              - - Loggerhead sea turtle (Caretta caretta)
                - Olive ridley sea turtle (Lepidochelys olivacea)

== Paleobiology ==
Aside from the nature of the sediments Leviathanochelys has been found in, its marine lifestyle is further confirmed by the histology of the costal plates. In this point, Leviathanochelys again bears resemblance to Archelon, indicating that both shared a similar lifestyle. In this case, both were likely pelagic open-water animals. The interpretation that this taxon's unique accessory process on the pelvis is connected to respiration would give additional credence to this lifestyle.
