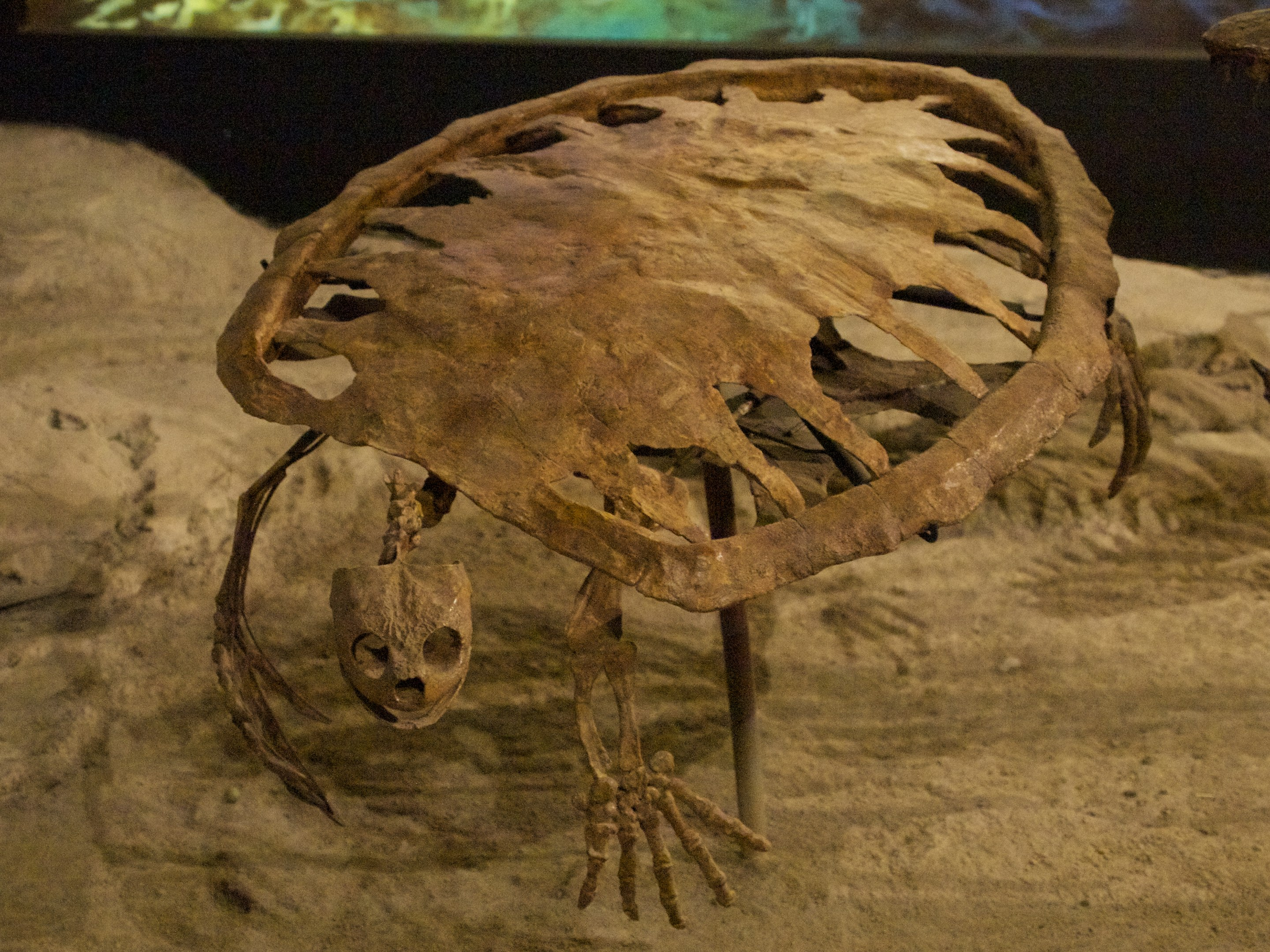
- Fossil of Toxochelys

Scientific classification
- Kingdom: Animalia
- Phylum: Chordata
- Class: Reptilia
- Order: Testudines
- Suborder: Cryptodira
- Clade: Americhelydia
- Clade: Panchelonioidea; Joyce et al., 2004

= Panchelonioidea =

Panchelonioidea Temporal range: Early Cretaceous to Holocene 120–0 Ma

Clade of turtles

Panchelonioidea is a clade of marine turtles that includes the sea turtles and related taxa.

== Phylogeny ==
Evers et al. (2019):

- Panchelonioidea
  - †Toxochelys
  - - †Protostegidae
    - Chelonioidea
      - †Corsochelys
      - Dermochelyidae
      - - †Nichollsemys
        - - †Allopleuron
          - - Cheloniidae
            - - †Argillochelys
              - †Procolpochelys
              - - †Eochelone
                - †Puppigerus
              - - †Ctenochelys
                - †Peritresius
                - †Cabindachelys
