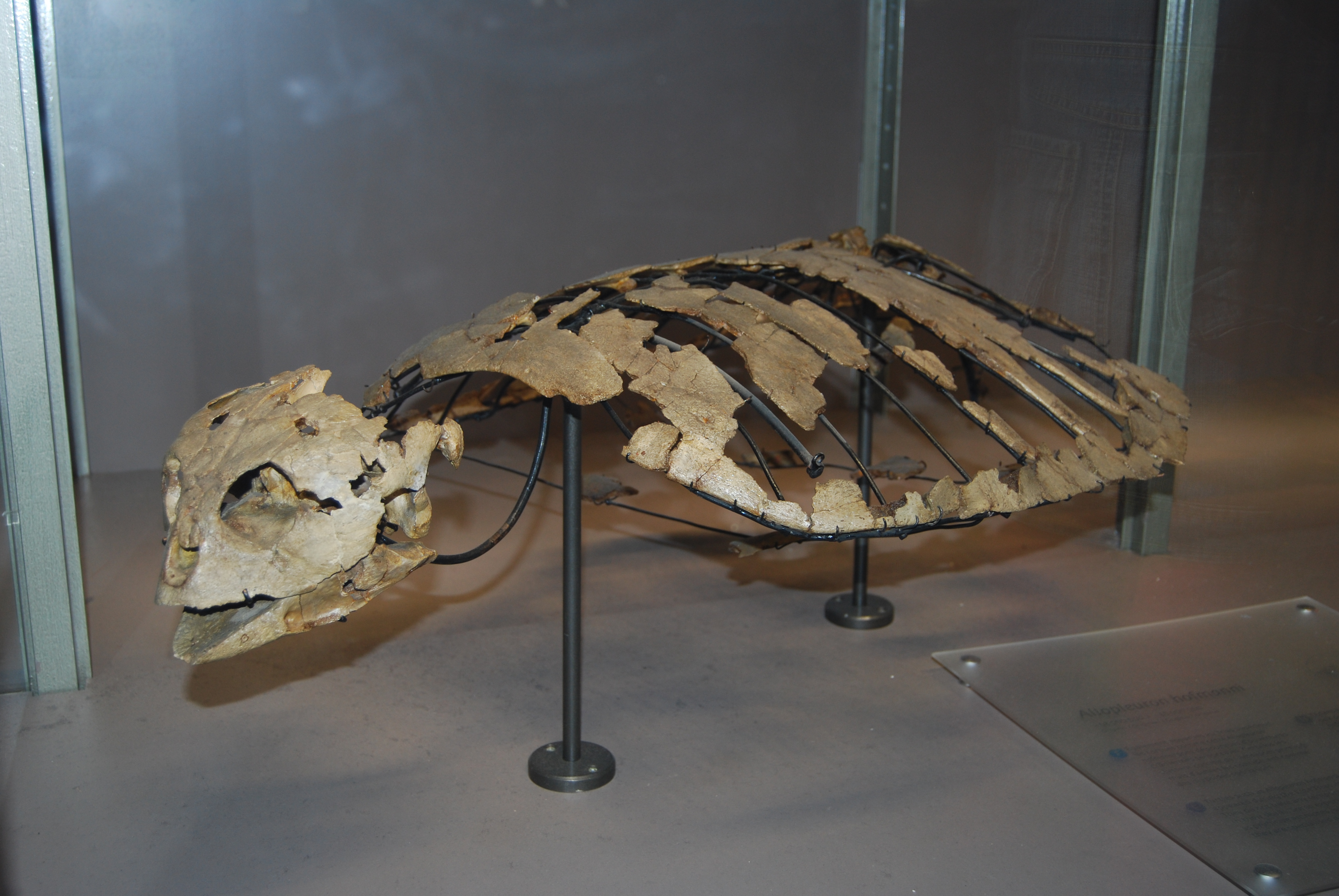
- Fossil specimen, Royal Belgian Institute of Natural Sciences

Scientific classification
- Kingdom: Animalia
- Phylum: Chordata
- Class: Reptilia
- Order: Testudines
- Suborder: Cryptodira
- Family: Cheloniidae
- Subfamily: †Allopleuroninae
- Genus: †Allopleuron; Baur, 1888

Type species
- Chelonia hofmanni Gray, 1831

Species
- †A. hofmanni (Gray, 1831); †A. insulare (Cope, 1872); †A. lipsiense Karl, 2007; †A. qazaqstanense Karl et al., 2012

= Allopleuron =

Allopleuron Temporal range: Late Cretaceous–Oligocene 94.3–28.4 Ma

Extinct genus of turtles

Allopleuron (meaning "other side") is a genus of extinct sea turtle, which measured 2-to-2.5-metre (6 ft 7 in to 8 ft 2 in) long in life. The type species is Allopleuron hofmanni. It is a basal member of the clade Pancheloniidae, closely related to Protosphargis. Similar to Protosphargis, it was characterized by shell reduction.

== Fossil history ==
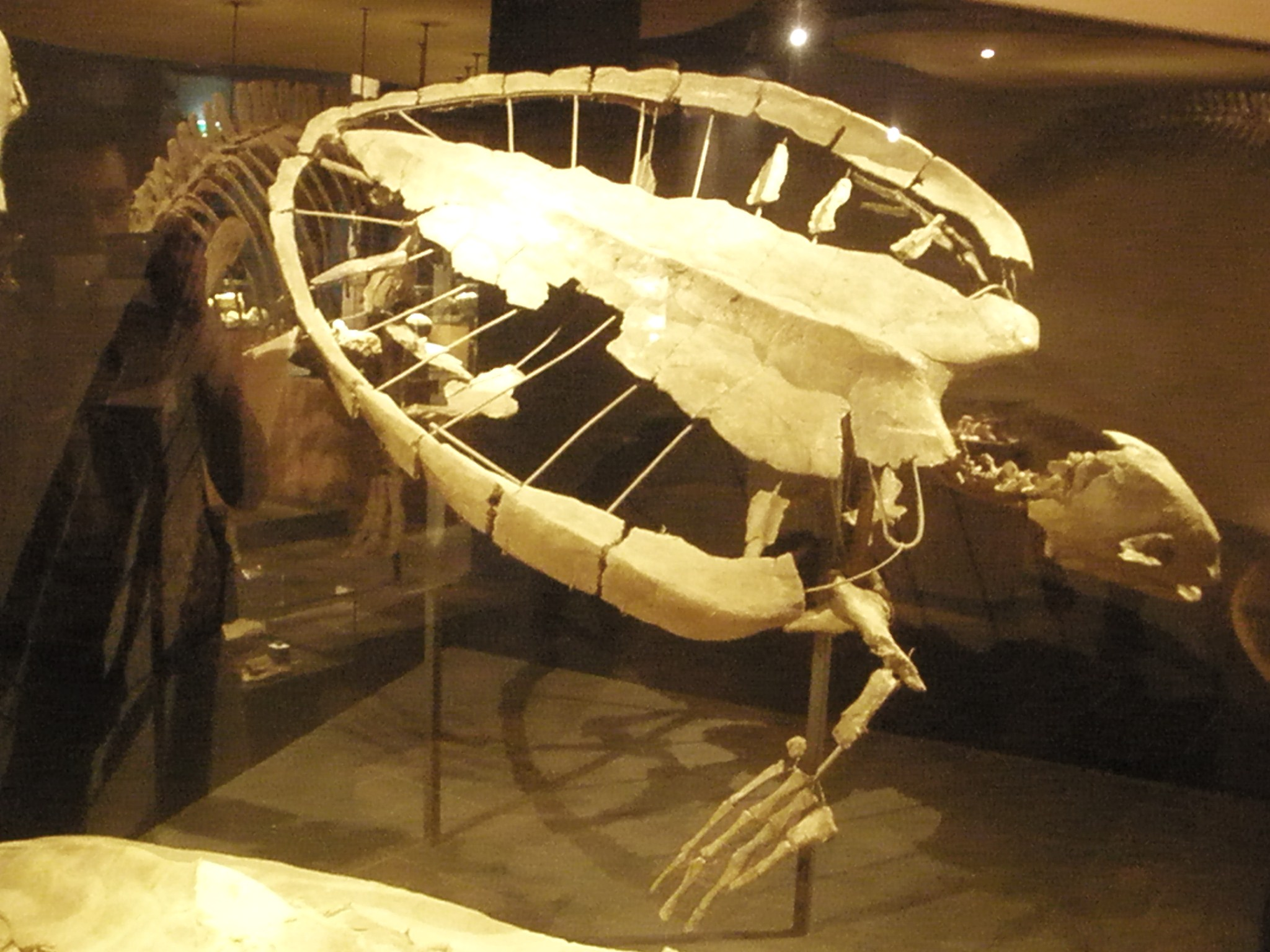

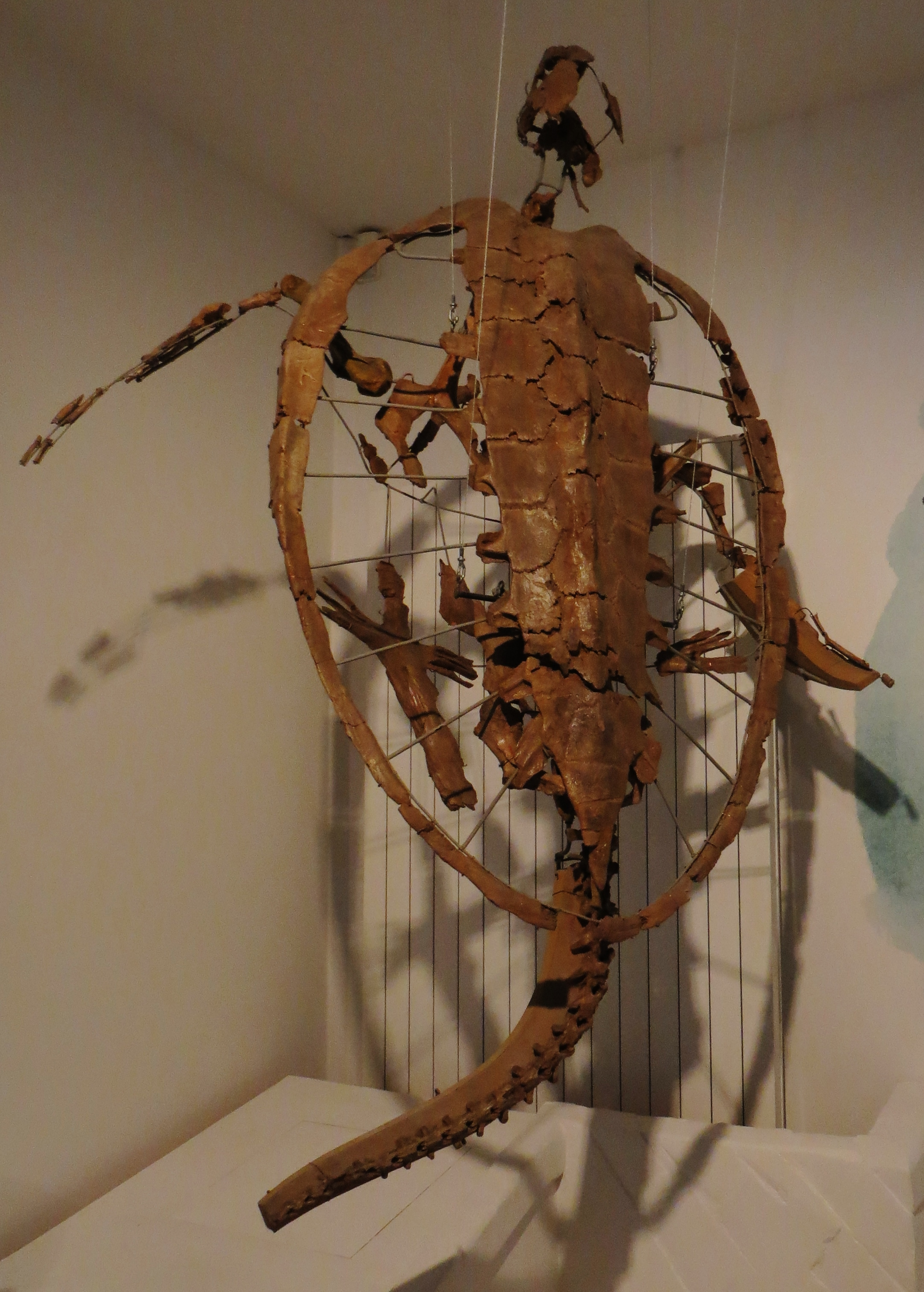
Top view

Allopleuron lived from the Late Cretaceous (Cenomanian age, 94.3 Ma) to the Oligocene (Rupelian age, 28.4 Ma), therefore surviving the Cretaceous-Paleogene extinction event. Fossils have been found from Germany, the Netherlands, Kazakhstan and the United States.

== Life history ==
Allopleuron was believed to have used the Laurasian-Holarctic southern continental shelf as a breeding area. The modern day location of the breeding ground is along the coast of Asia. Allopleuron is believed to have eaten jellyfish, seaweed, or carcasses; A. hofmanni δ^{13}C values indicate a carnivorous diet. It is believed that adult male Allopleuron lived off the coast of southeast Netherlands, and northeast Belgium due to the large amount of fossils in these areas. The area is believed to have been a sea grass meadow that was able to sustain the large population. The lack of remains from juvenile Allopleuron indicate that the young of the species lived elsewhere.

== Phylogeny ==
Evers et al. (2019):

- Panchelonioidea
  - †Toxochelys
  - - †Protostegidae
    - Chelonioidea
      - †Corsochelys
      - Dermochelyidae
      - - †Nichollsemys
        - - †Allopleuron
          - - Cheloniidae
            - - †Argillochelys
              - †Procolpochelys
              - - †Eochelone
                - †Puppigerus
              - - †Ctenochelys
                - †Peritresius
                - †Cabindachelys
