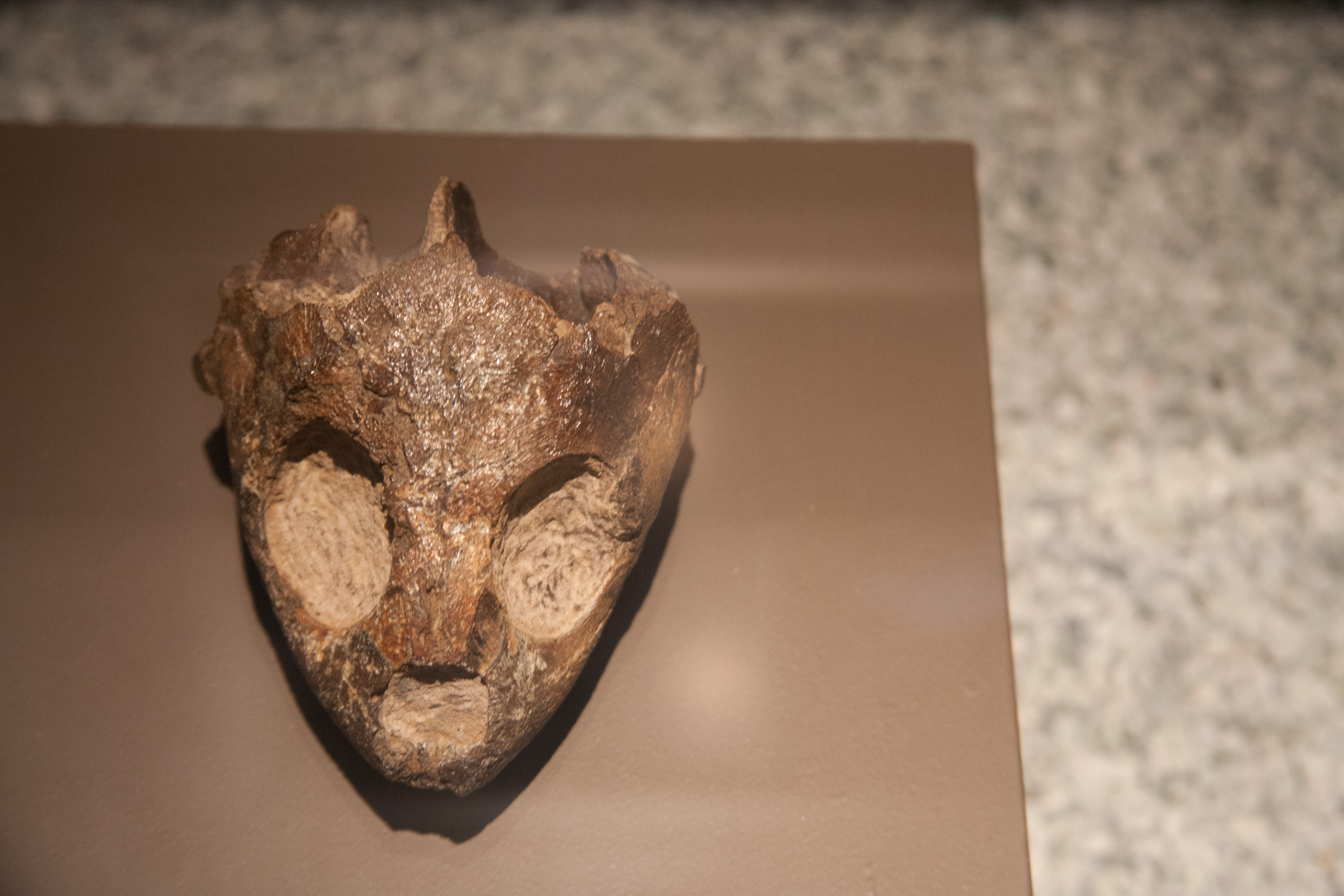
- Skull, Royal Tyrrell Museum in Alberta, Canada

Scientific classification
- Domain: Eukaryota
- Kingdom: Animalia
- Phylum: Chordata
- Class: Reptilia
- Order: Testudines
- Suborder: Cryptodira
- Superfamily: Chelonioidea
- Genus: †Nichollsemys; Brinkman, 2006

Species
- †N. baieri (Brinkman, 2006)

= Nichollsemys =

Nichollsemys Temporal range: Late Cretaceous 84.9–70.6 Ma

Extinct turtle

Nichollsemys is a genus of extinct sea turtles. The only known species is Nichollsemys baieri.

== Taxonomy ==
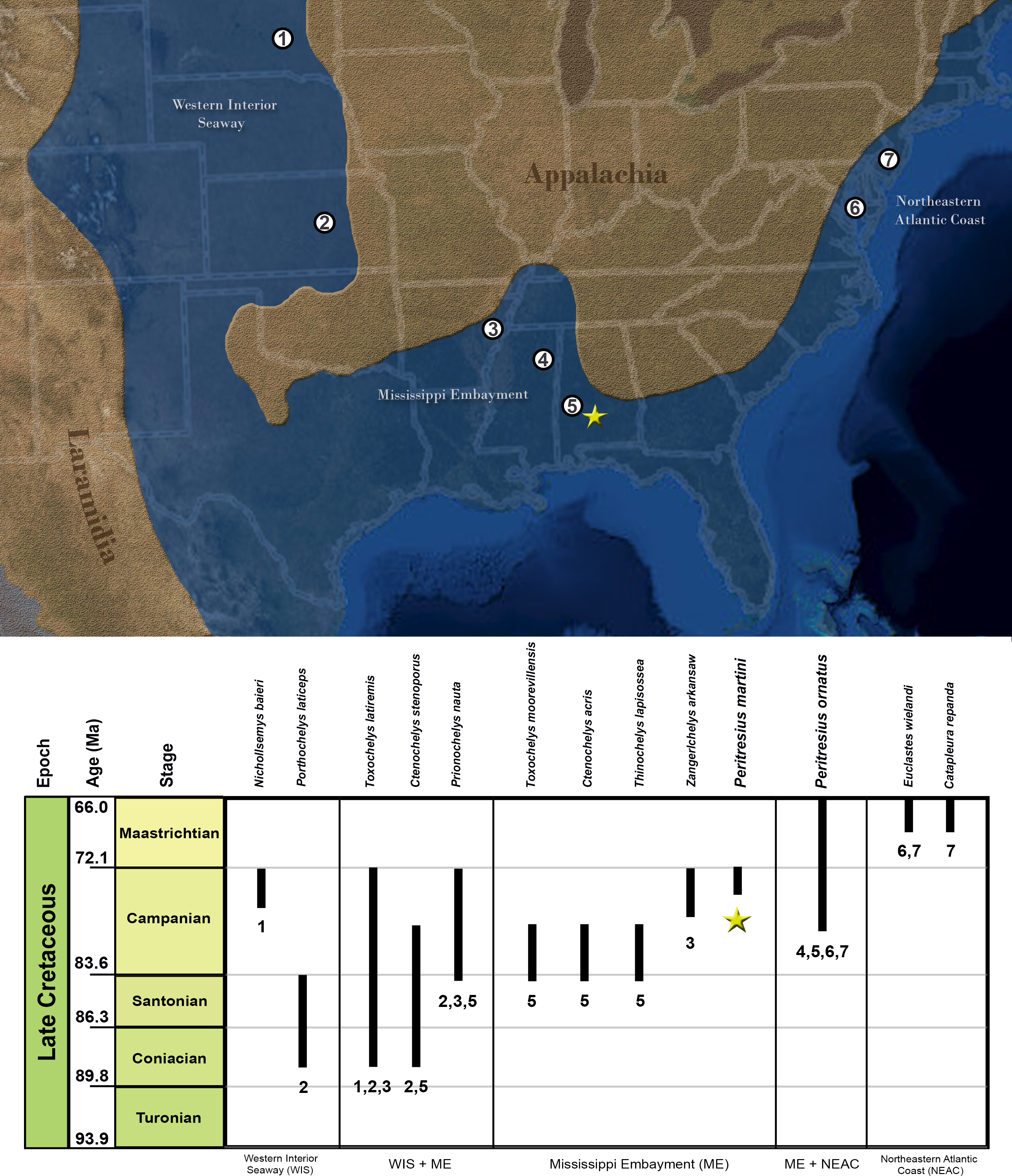
Biostratigraphy and paleobiogeography of Late Cretaceous chelonioids of North America, with Nichollsemys (1) at upper left

Fossils of the Nichollsemys from Alberta [Alberta]], Canada, were discovered in 1997 by Ron Baier while prospecting near Chin Lake. Baier, who grew up in southeastern Alberta, contacted the Royal Terrell Museum which then performed a CT scan and identified it as the skull of a marine turtle dating to the Cretaceous Period and the first of its kind found. The fossils have been described by Donald Brinkman who named it in 2006. The fossils found so far are all skulls.

The name of Nichollsemys is a tribute to Elizabeth Nicholls, a paleontologist from Canada who studied marine reptiles from the Triassic period. She had previously done work with Brinkman when they found the ichthyosaur genus Parvinatator. The species name of baieri is in honor of Baier, who found the first fossil.

== Evolution ==
- Panchelonioidea
  - †Toxochelys
  - - †Protostegidae
    - Chelonioidea
      - †Corsochelys
      - Dermochelyidae
      - - †Nichollsemys
        - - †Allopleuron
          - - Cheloniidae
            - - †Argillochelys
              - †Procolpochelys
              - - †Eochelone
                - †Puppigerus
              - - †Ctenochelys
                - †Peritresius
                - †Cabindachelys

== Description ==
The full length of the Nichollsemys is unknown, but Brinkman made a chart of the length of some parts of the specimen. The length from the basioccipital to the premaxilla measures 11.4 cm, the width of all the quadrates measures 9.8 cm, the depth at level of the quadrates measures 7.1 cm, the intraorbital width measures 2 cm, and the length measures 3.6 cm. The cranium has many things in common with that of Toxochelys: for example, they both have a rostrum basisphenoidale shaped like a rod.

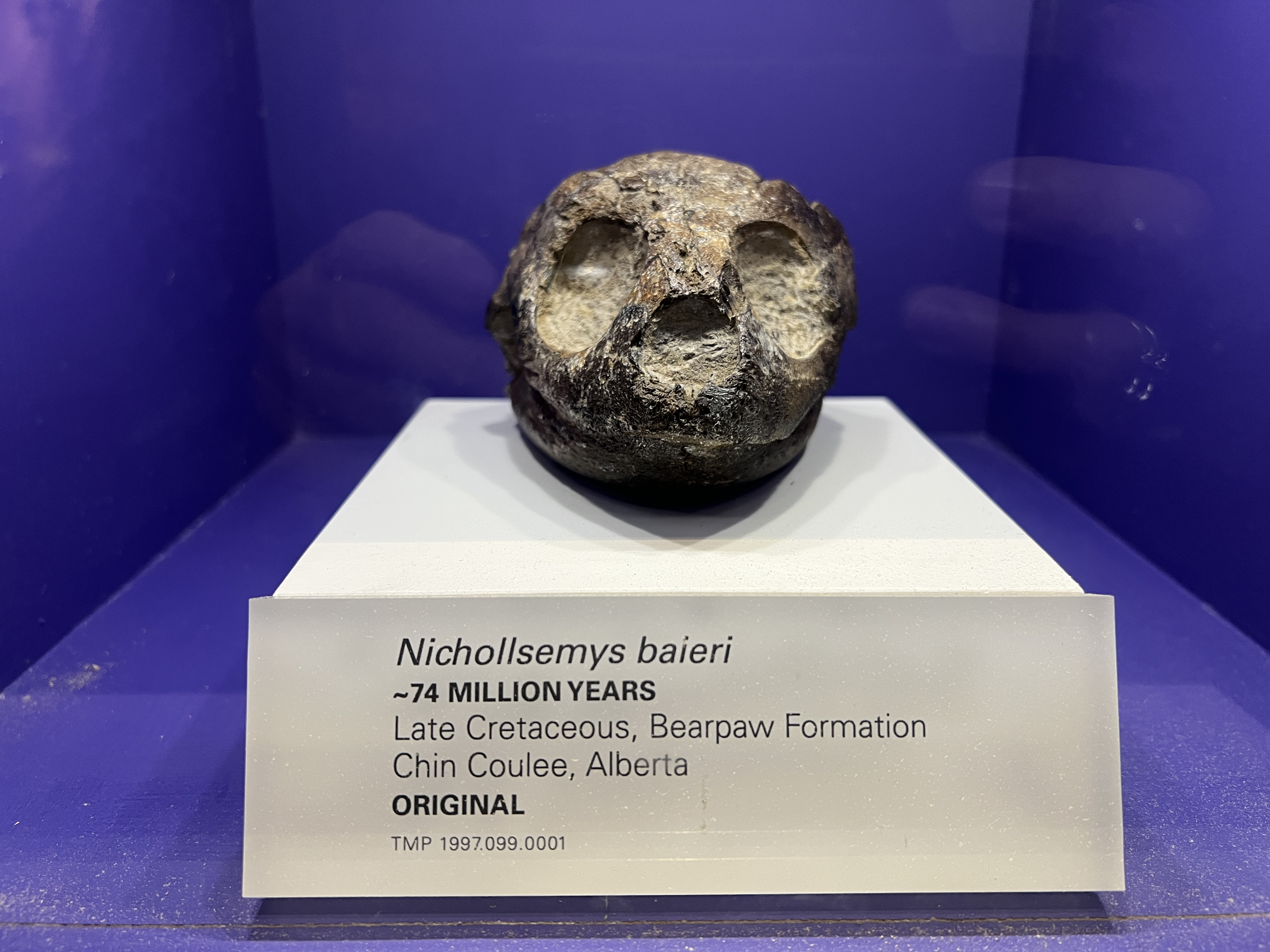
Nichollsemys Baieri front view Photo taken at Royal Tyrrell Museum (4 May 2025 Susan Gerbic)

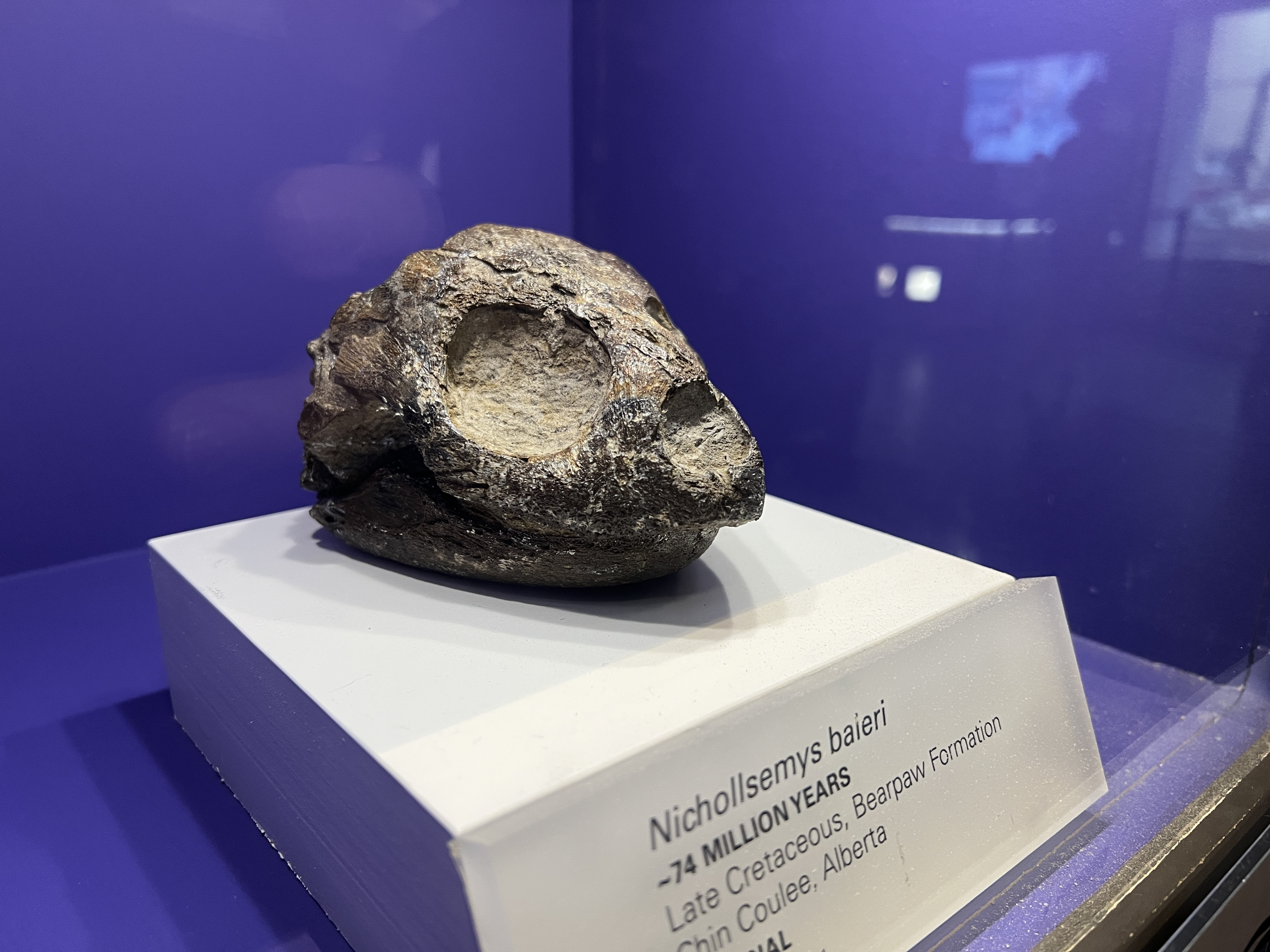
Nichollsemys Baieri side view Photo taken at Royal Tyrrell Museum (4 May 2025 Susan Gerbic)

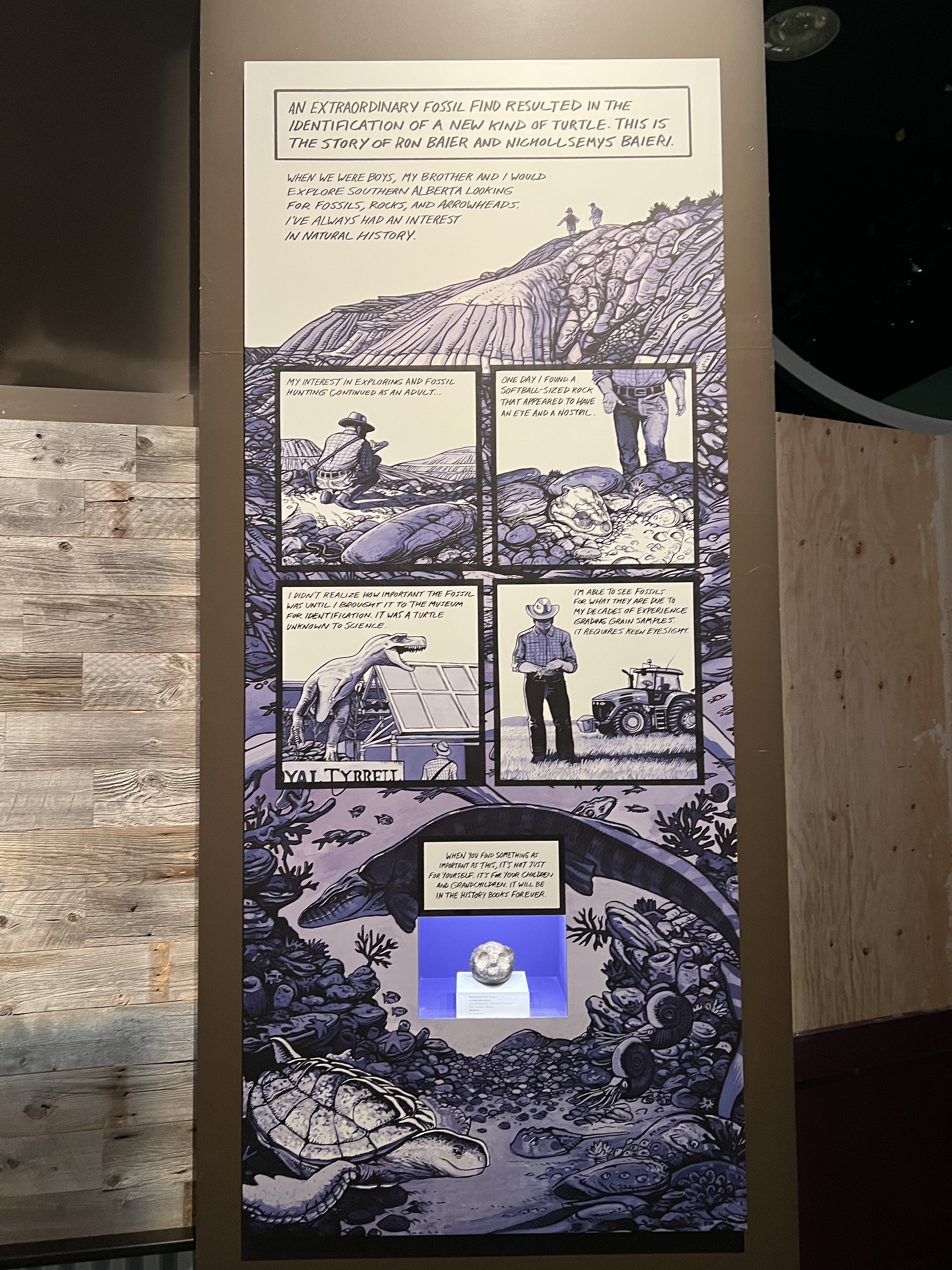
Display for Nichollsemys Baieri Photo taken at Royal Tyrrell Museum (4 May 2025 Susan Gerbic)
