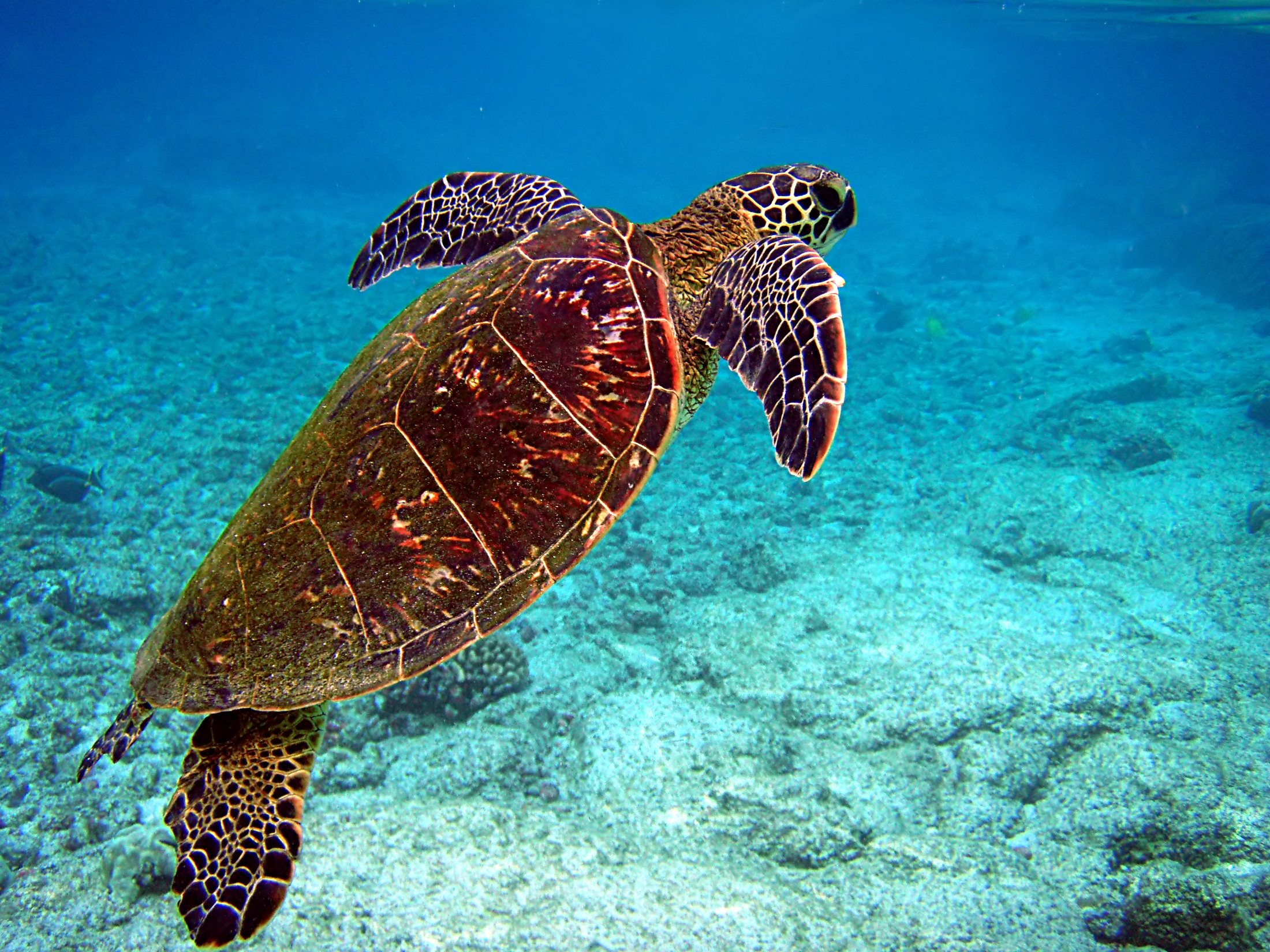
- A green sea turtle, a species of the sea turtle superfamily

Scientific classification
- Kingdom: Animalia
- Phylum: Chordata
- Class: Reptilia
- Order: Testudines
- Suborder: Cryptodira
- Clade: Americhelydia
- Clade: Panchelonioidea
- Superfamily: Chelonioidea; Bauer, 1893

Families
- Dermochelyidae; Cheloniidae; †Ctenochelyidae

Synonyms
- Chelonii - Oppel, 1811; Chlonopteria - Rafinesque, 1814; Cheloniae - Schmid, 1819; Edigitata - Haworth, 1825; Oiacopodae - Wagler, 1828; Pterodactyli - Mayer, 1849

= Sea turtle =

Sea turtles Temporal range: Early Cretaceous – Holocene, 110–0 Ma

Reptiles of the superfamily Chelonioidea

Sea turtles (superfamily Chelonioidea), sometimes called marine turtles, are reptiles of the order Testudines and of the suborder Cryptodira. The seven existing species of sea turtles are the flatback, green, hawksbill, leatherback, loggerhead, Kemp's ridley, and olive ridley. Five of the seven species are listed as threatened with extinction globally on the IUCN Red List of Threatened Species. The remaining two are not considered to be threatened with extinction, one of which, the flatback turtle, is found only in the waters of Australia, Papua New Guinea, and Indonesia.

Sea turtles can be categorized as hard-shelled (cheloniid) or leathery-shelled (dermochelyid). The only dermochelyid species of sea turtle is the leatherback.

A sea turtle swimming in an aquarium in Japan, 2025

== Description ==
For each of the seven species of sea turtles, females and males are the same size. As adults, it is possible to tell male turtles from female turtles by their long tails with a cloacal opening near the tip. Adult female sea turtles have shorter tails, with a cloacal opening near the base. Hatchling and sub-adult turtles do not exhibit sexual dimorphism; it is not possible to determine their sex by looking at them.

In general, sea turtles have a more fusiform body plan than their terrestrial or freshwater counterparts. This tapering at both ends reduces volume and means that sea turtles cannot retract their head and limbs into their shells for protection, unlike many other turtles and tortoises. However, the streamlined body plan reduces friction and drag in the water and allows sea turtles to swim more easily and swiftly.

The leatherback sea turtle is the largest sea turtle, reaching 1.4 to more than 1.8 m (4.6 to 5.9 ft) in length and weighing between 300 and 640 kg (661 to 1,411 lbs). Other sea turtle species are smaller, ranging from as little as 60 cm (2 ft) long in the case of the Kemp's ridley, which is the smallest sea turtle species, to 120 cm (3.9 ft) long in the case of the green turtle, the second largest.

The skulls of sea turtles have cheek regions that are enclosed in bone. Although this condition appears to resemble that found in the earliest known fossil reptiles (anapsids), it is possible it is a more recently evolved trait in sea turtles, placing them outside the anapsids.

== Taxonomy and evolution ==
Green (left) and loggerhead (right) sea turtles

Sea turtles, along with other turtles and tortoises, are part of the order Testudines. All species except the leatherback sea turtle are in the family Cheloniidae. The superfamily name Chelonioidea and family name Cheloniidae are based on the Ancient Greek word for tortoise: χελώνη (khelōnē). The leatherback sea turtle is the only extant member of the family Dermochelyidae.

Fossil evidence of marine turtles goes back to the Late Jurassic (150 million years ago) with genera such as Plesiochelys, from Europe. In Africa, the first marine turtle is Angolachelys, from the Turonian of Angola. A lineage of unrelated marine testudines, the pleurodire (side-necked) bothremydids, also survived well into the Cenozoic. Other pleurodires are also thought to have lived at sea, such as Araripemys and extinct pelomedusids. Modern sea turtles are not descended from more than one of the groups of sea-going turtles that have existed in the past; they instead constitute a single radiation that became distinct from all other turtles at least 110 million years ago. Their closest extant relatives are in fact the snapping turtles (Chelydridae), musk turtles (Kinosternidae), and hickatee (Dermatemyidae) of the Americas, which alongside the sea turtles constitute the clade Americhelydia.

The oldest possible representative of the lineage (Panchelonioidea) leading to modern sea turtles was possibly Desmatochelys padillai from the Early Cretaceous. Desmatochelys was a protostegid, a lineage that would later give rise to some very large species but went extinct at the end of the Cretaceous. Presently thought to be outside the crown group that contains modern sea turtles (Chelonioidea), the exact relationships of protostegids to modern sea turtles are still debated due to their primitive morphology; they may be the sister group to the Chelonoidea, or an unrelated turtle lineage that convergently evolved similar adaptations. The earliest "true" sea turtle that is known from fossils is Nichollsemys from the Early Cretaceous (Albian) of Canada. In 2022, the giant fossil species Leviathanochelys was described from Spain. This species inhabited the oceans covering Europe in the Late Cretaceous and rivaled the concurrent giant protostegids such as Archelon and Protostega as one of the largest turtles to ever exist. Unlike the protostegids, which have an uncertain relationship to modern sea turtles, Leviathanochelys is thought to be a true sea turtle of the superfamily Chelonioidea.

Sea turtles' limbs and brains have evolved to adapt to their diets. Their limbs originally evolved for locomotion, but more recently evolved to aid them in feeding. They use their limbs to hold, swipe, and forage their food. This helps them eat more efficiently.

=== Phylogeny ===
The phylogenetic relationships of living and extinct sea turtles in the Chelonioidea are based on Evers et al. (2019):

Phylogenetic relations of living and extinct chelonioid species

- Panchelonioidea
  - †Toxochelys
  - - †Protostegidae
    - Chelonioidea
      - †Corsochelys
      - Dermochelyidae
      - Pancheloniidae
        - †Nichollsemys
        - - †Allopleuron
          - - Cheloniidae
            - - †Argillochelys
              - †Procolpochelys
              - - †Eochelone
                - †Puppigerus
              - - †Ctenochelys
                - †Peritresius
                - †Cabindachelys

An alternate phylogeny was proposed by Castillo-Visa et al. (2022):

- Panchelonioidea
  - †Toxochelyidae
  - - †Protostegidae
    - †Corsochelys
    - Chelonioidea
      - Dermochelyidae
        - †Eosphargis
        - Dermochelys
      - - †Nichollsemys
        - - - †Leviathanochelys
            - †Allopleuron
          - - †Procolpochelys
            - - †Argillochelys
              - - †Eochelone
                - †Puppigerus
              - Ctenochelyidae
                - †Cabindachelys
                - †Ctenochelys
                - †Peritresius
              - Cheloniidae
                - Natator
                - Eretmochelys
                - Chelonia
                - - Lepidochelys kempii
                  - - Caretta
                    - Lepidochelys olivacea

== Distribution and habitat ==
Sea turtles can be found in all oceans except for the polar regions. The flatback sea turtle is found solely on the northern coast of Australia. The Kemp's ridley sea turtle is found solely in the Gulf of Mexico and along the East Coast of the United States.

Sea turtles are generally found in the waters over continental shelves. During the first three to five years of life, sea turtles spend most of their time in the pelagic zone floating in seaweed mats. Green sea turtles in particular are often found in Sargassum mats, in which they find food, shelter and water. Once the sea turtle has reached adulthood it moves closer to the shore. Females will come ashore to lay their eggs on sandy beaches during the nesting season.

Sea turtles migrate to reach their spawning beaches, which are limited in numbers. Living in the ocean therefore means they usually migrate over large distances. All sea turtles have large body sizes, which is helpful for moving large distances. Large body sizes also offer good protection against the large predators (notably sharks) found in the ocean.

In 2020, diminished human activity resulting from the COVID-19 virus caused an increase in sea turtle nesting. Some areas in Thailand saw an abnormally high number of nests, and Florida experienced a similar phenomenon. Less plastic and light pollution could explain these observations.

== Life cycle ==
1) Male and female sea turtles age in the ocean and migrate to shallow coastal water. 2) Sea turtles mate in the water near offshore nesting sites. 3) The adult male sea turtles return to the feeding sites in the water. 4) Female sea turtles cycle between mating and nesting. 5) Female sea turtles lay their eggs. 6) When the season is over, female sea turtles return to feeding sites. 7) Baby sea turtles incubate for 60–80 days and hatch. 8) Newly hatched baby sea turtles emerge from nests and travel from the shore to the water. 9) Baby sea turtles mature in the ocean until they are ready to begin the cycle again.

Sea turtles are thought to reach sexual maturity from about 10−20 years old depending on species and methodology. However, reliable estimates are difficult to ascertain. Mature sea turtles may migrate thousands of miles to reach breeding sites. After mating at sea, adult female sea turtles return to land to lay their eggs. Different species of sea turtles exhibit various levels of philopatry. In the extreme case, females return to the same beach where they hatched. This can take place every two to four years in maturity.

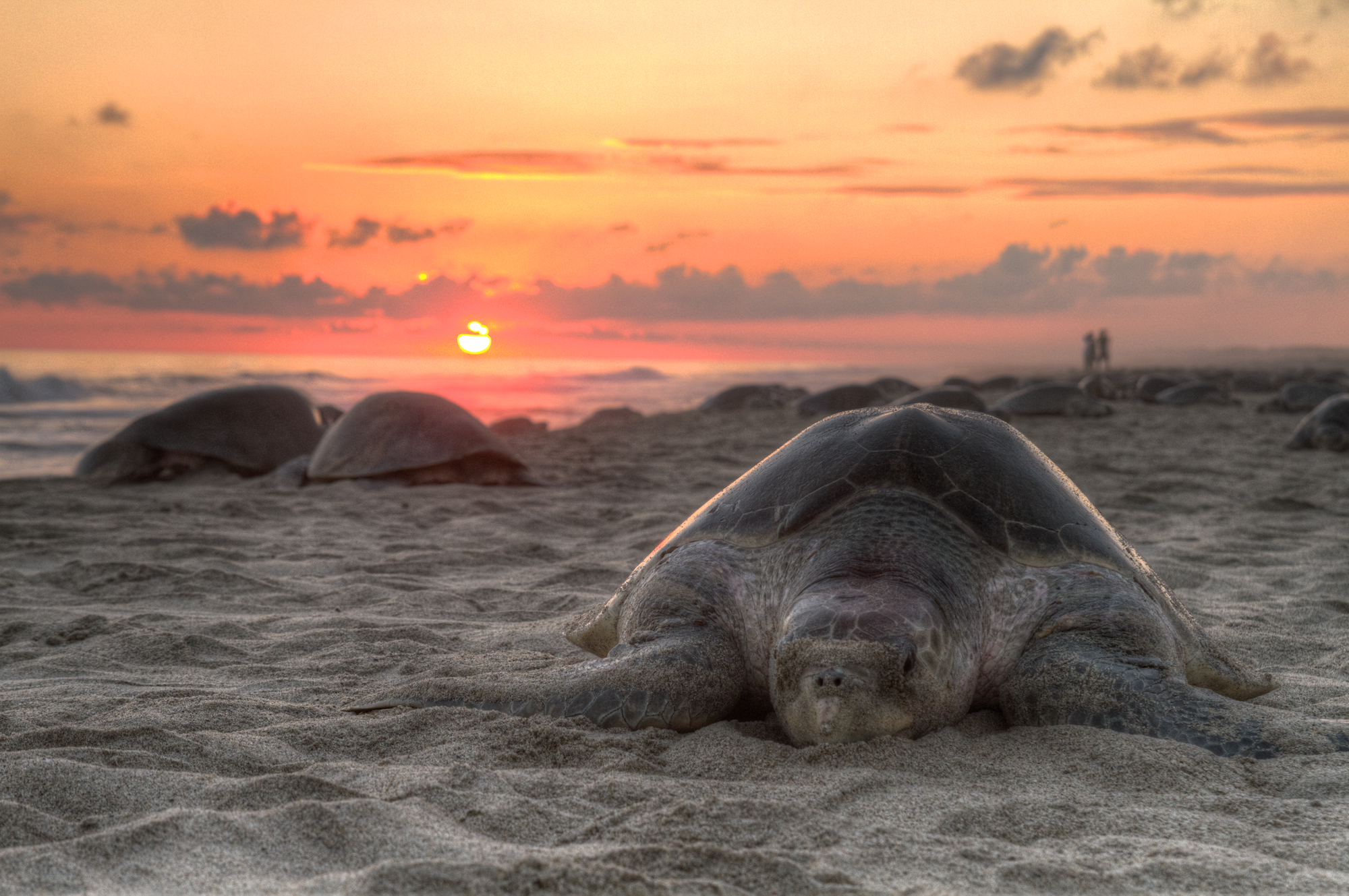
An olive ridley sea turtle nesting on Escobilla Beach, Oaxaca, Mexico

The mature nesting female hauls herself onto the beach, nearly always at night, and finds suitable sand in which to create a nest. Using her hind flippers, she digs a circular hole 40 to 50 centimetres (16 to 20 in) deep. After the hole is dug, the female then starts filling the nest with her clutch of soft-shelled eggs. Depending on the species, a typical clutch may contain 50–350 eggs. After laying, she re-fills the nest with sand, re-sculpting and smoothing the surface, and then camouflaging the nest with vegetation until it is relatively undetectable visually. She may also dig decoy nests. The whole process takes 30 to 60 minutes. She then returns to the ocean, leaving the eggs untended.

Females may lay 1–8 clutches in a single season. Female sea turtles alternate between mating in the water and laying their eggs on land. Most sea turtle species nest individually. But ridley sea turtles come ashore en masse, known as an arribada (arrival). With the Kemp's ridley sea turtle this occurs during the day.

Sea turtles have temperature-dependent sex determination. Warmer temperatures produce female hatchlings, while cooler temperatures produce male hatchlings. The eggs will incubate for 50–60 days. The eggs in one nest hatch together over a short period of time. The baby sea turtles break free of the egg shell, dig through the sand, and crawl into the sea. Most species of sea turtles hatch at night. However, the Kemp's ridley sea turtle commonly hatches during the day. Sea turtle nests that hatch during the day are more vulnerable to predators, and may encounter more human activity on the beach.

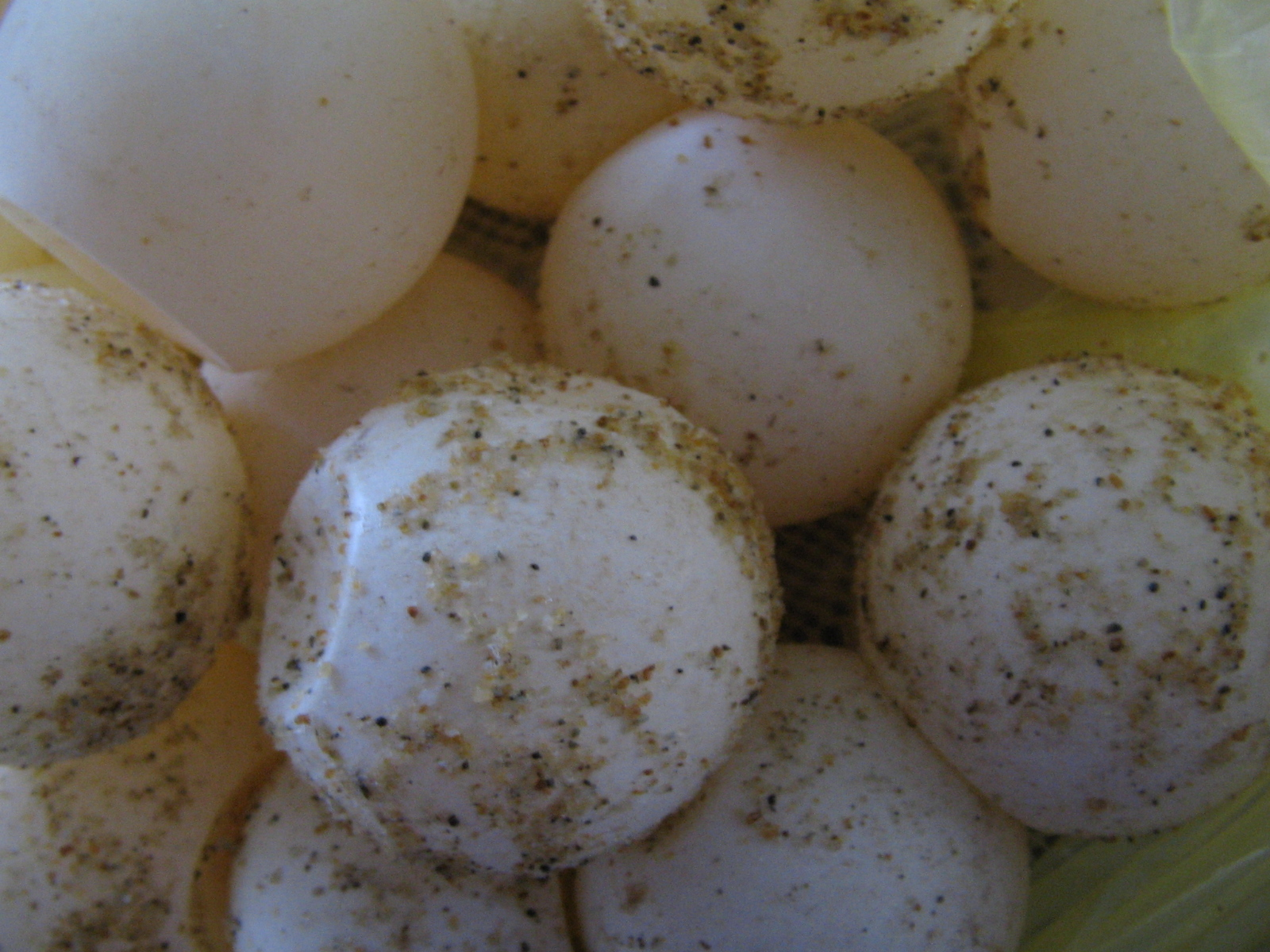
Sea turtle sex depends on sand temperature while the egg is incubating.

Larger hatchlings have a higher probability of survival than smaller individuals, which can be explained by the fact that larger offspring are faster and thus less exposed to predation. Predators can only functionally intake so much; larger individuals are not targeted as often. A study conducted on this topic shows that body size is positively correlated with speed, so larger baby sea turtles are exposed to predators for a shorter amount of time. The fact that there is size dependent predation on chelonians has led to the evolutionary development of large body sizes.

In 1987, Carr discovered that the young of green and loggerhead sea turtles spent a great deal of their pelagic lives in floating sargassum mats. Within these mats, they found ample shelter and food. In the absence of sargassum, young sea turtles feed in the vicinity of upwelling "fronts". In 2007, Reich determined that green sea turtle hatchlings spend the first three to five years of their lives in pelagic waters. In the open ocean, pre-juveniles of this particular species were found to feed on zooplankton and smaller nekton before they are recruited into inshore seagrass meadows as obligate herbivores.

Hatchlings

Green (Chelonia mydas)

Flatback (Natator compressus)

Hawksbill (Eretmochelys imbricata)

Loggerhead (Caretta caretta)

Olive ridley (Lepidochelys olivacea)

Kemp's ridley (Lepidochelys kempii)

Leatherback (Dermochelys coriacea)

== Physiology ==
=== Osmoregulation ===
Sea turtles maintain an internal environment that is hypotonic to the ocean. To maintain hypotonicity they must excrete excess salt ions. Like other marine reptiles, sea turtles rely on a specialized gland to rid the body of excess salt, because reptilian kidneys cannot produce urine with a higher ion concentration than sea water. All species of sea turtles have a lachrymal gland in the orbital cavity, capable of producing tears with a higher salt concentration than sea water.

Leatherback sea turtles face an increased osmotic challenge compared to other species of sea turtle, since their primary prey are jellyfish and other gelatinous plankton, whose fluids have the same concentration of salts as sea water. The much larger lachrymal gland found in leatherback sea turtles may have evolved to cope with the higher intake of salts from their prey. A constant output of concentrated salty tears may be required to balance the input of salts from regular feeding, even considering leatherback sea turtle tears can have a salt ion concentration almost twice that of other species of sea turtle.

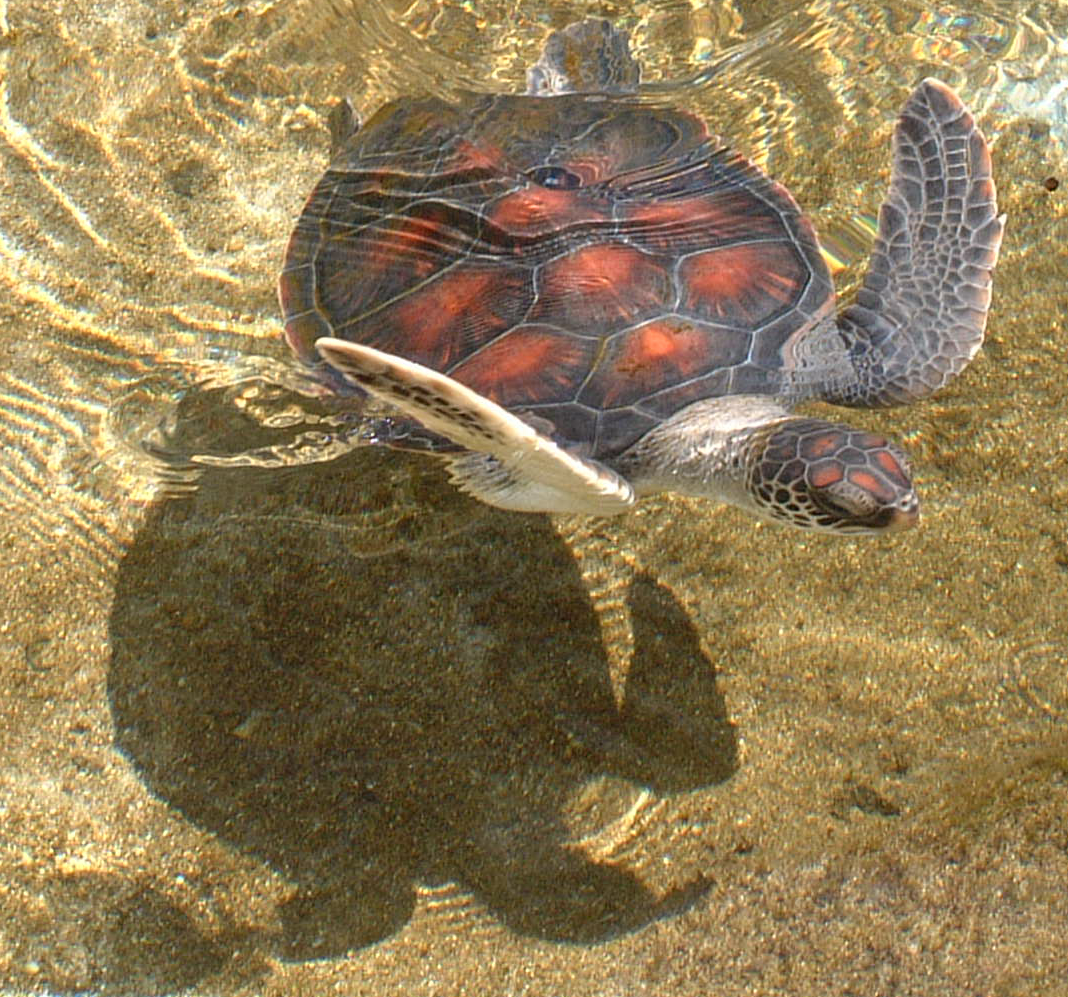
Immature Hawaiian green sea turtle in shallow waters

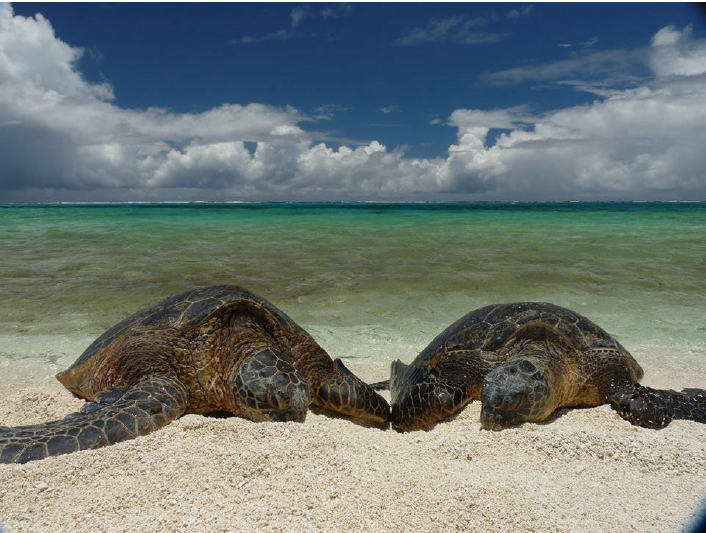
Sea turtles basking in the Papahānaumokuākea Marine National Monument in the Northwestern Hawaiian Islands.

Hatchlings depend on drinking sea water immediately upon entering the ocean to replenish water lost during the hatching process. Salt gland functioning begins quickly after hatching, so that the young sea turtles can establish ion and water balance soon after entering the ocean. Survival and physiological performance hinge on immediate and efficient hydration following emergence from the nest.

=== Thermoregulation ===
All sea turtles are poikilotherms. However, leatherback sea turtles (family Dermochelyidae) are able to maintain a body temperature 8 °C (14 °F) warmer than the ambient water by thermoregulation through the trait of gigantothermy.

Green sea turtles in the relatively cooler Pacific are known to haul themselves out of the water on remote islands to bask in the sun. This behavior has only been observed in a few locations, including the Galapagos, Hawaii, Europa Island, and parts of Australia.

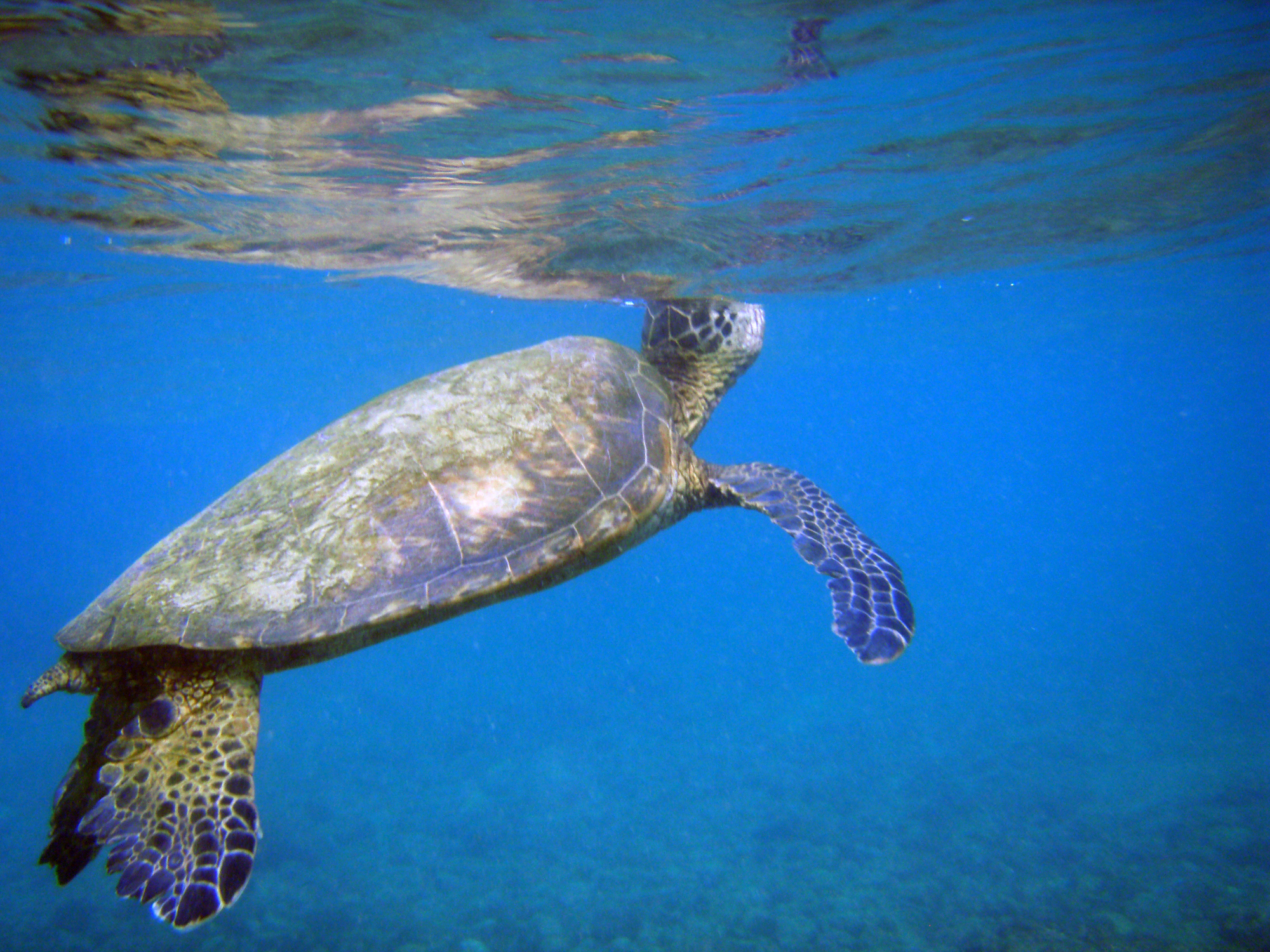
A green sea turtle breaks the surface to breathe.

=== Diving physiology ===
Sea turtles are air-breathing reptiles that have lungs, so they regularly surface to breathe. Sea turtles spend a majority of their time underwater, so they must be able to hold their breath for long periods. Dive duration largely depends on activity. A foraging sea turtle may typically spend 5–40 minutes underwater while a sleeping sea turtle can remain underwater for 4–7 hours. Remarkably, sea turtle respiration remains aerobic for the vast majority of voluntary dive time. When a sea turtle is forcibly submerged (e.g. entangled in a trawl net) its diving endurance is substantially reduced, so it is more susceptible to drowning.

When surfacing to breathe, a sea turtle can quickly refill its lungs with a single explosive exhalation and rapid inhalation. Their large lungs permit rapid exchange of oxygen and avoid trapping gases during deep dives.

Cold-stunning is a phenomenon that occurs when sea turtles enter cold ocean water (7–10 °C (45–50 °F)), which causes the turtles to float to the surface and therefore makes it impossible for them to swim.

=== Fluorescence ===
Gruber and Sparks (2015) have observed the first fluorescence in a marine tetrapod (four-limbed vertebrates). Sea turtles are the first biofluorescent reptile found in the wild.

According to Gruber and Sparks (2015), fluorescence is observed in an increasing number of marine creatures (cnidarians, ctenophores, annelids, arthropods, and chordates) and is now also considered to be widespread in cartilaginous and ray-finned fishes.

The two marine biologists accidentally made the observation in the Solomon Islands on a hawksbill sea turtle, one of the rarest and most endangered sea turtle species in the ocean, during a night dive aimed to film the biofluorescence emitted by small sharks and coral reefs. The role of biofluorescence in marine organisms is often attributed to a strategy for attracting prey or perhaps a way to communicate. It could also serve as a way of defense or camouflage for the sea turtle hiding during night amongst other fluorescent organisms like corals. Fluorescent corals and sea creatures are best observed during night dives with a blue LED light and with a camera equipped with an orange optical filter to capture only the fluorescence light.

=== Sensory modalities ===
==== Navigation ====
Below the surface, the sensory cues available for navigation change dramatically. Light availability decreases quickly with depth, and is refracted by the movement of water when present, celestial cues are often obscured, and ocean currents cause continuous drift. Most sea turtle species migrate over significant distances to nesting or foraging grounds, some even crossing entire ocean basins. Passive drifting within major current systems, such as those in the North Atlantic Gyre, can result in ejection well outside of the temperature tolerance range of a given species, causing heat stress, hypothermia, or death. In order to reliably navigate within strong gyre currents in the open ocean, migrating sea turtles possess both a bicoordinate magnetic map and magnetic compass sense, using a form of navigation termed Magnetoreception. Specific migratory routes have been shown to vary between individuals, making the possession of both a magnetic map and compass sense advantageous for sea turtles.

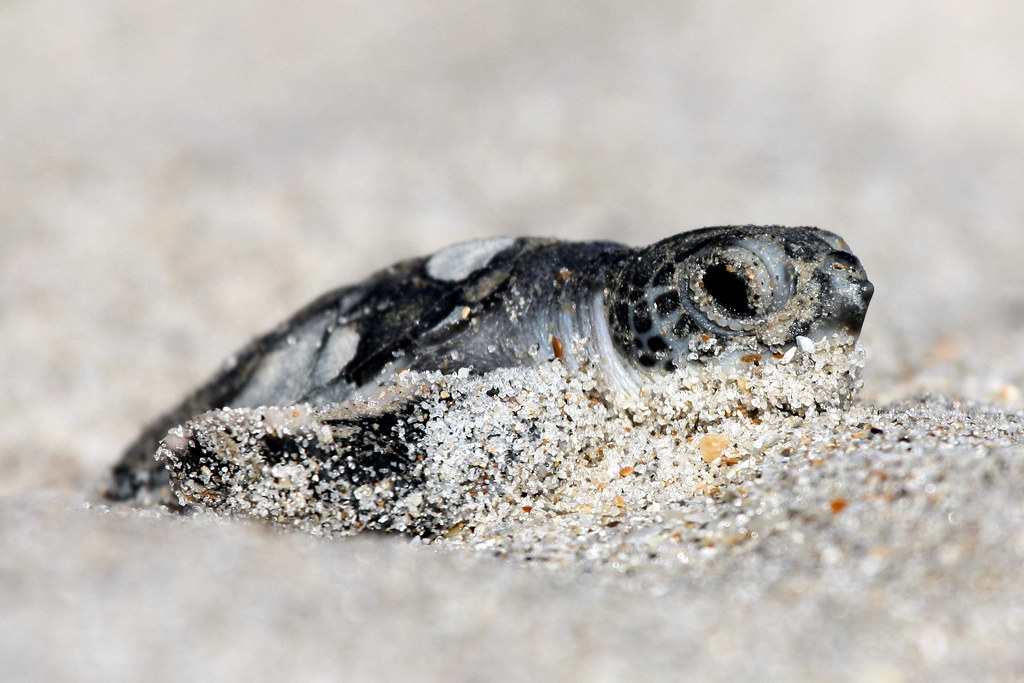
Hatchling green sea turtle in the sand photographed by USFWS Southeast

A bicoordinate magnetic map gives sea turtles the ability to determine their position relative to a goal with both latitudinal and longitudinal information, and requires the detection and interpretation of more than one magnetic parameter going in opposite directions to generate, such as Magnetic field intensity and Inclination angle. A magnetic compass sense allows sea turtles to determine and maintain a specific magnetic heading or orientation. These magnetic senses are thought to be inherited, as hatchling sea turtles swim in directions that would keep them on course when exposed to the magnetic field signatures of various locations along their species' migratory routes.

Natal homing behavior is well described in sea turtles, and genetic testing of turtle populations at different nesting sites has shown that magnetic field is a more reliable indicator of genetic similarity than physical distance between sites. Additionally, nesting sites have been recorded to "drift" along with isoline shifts in the magnetic field. Magnetoreception is thought to be the primary navigation tool used by nesting sea turtles in returning to natal beaches. There are three major theories explaining natal site learning: inherited magnetic information, socially facilitated migration, and geomagnetic imprinting. Some support has been found for geomagnetic imprinting, including successful experiments transplanting populations of sea turtles by relocating them prior to hatching, but the exact mechanism is still not known.

== Ecology ==
=== Diet ===
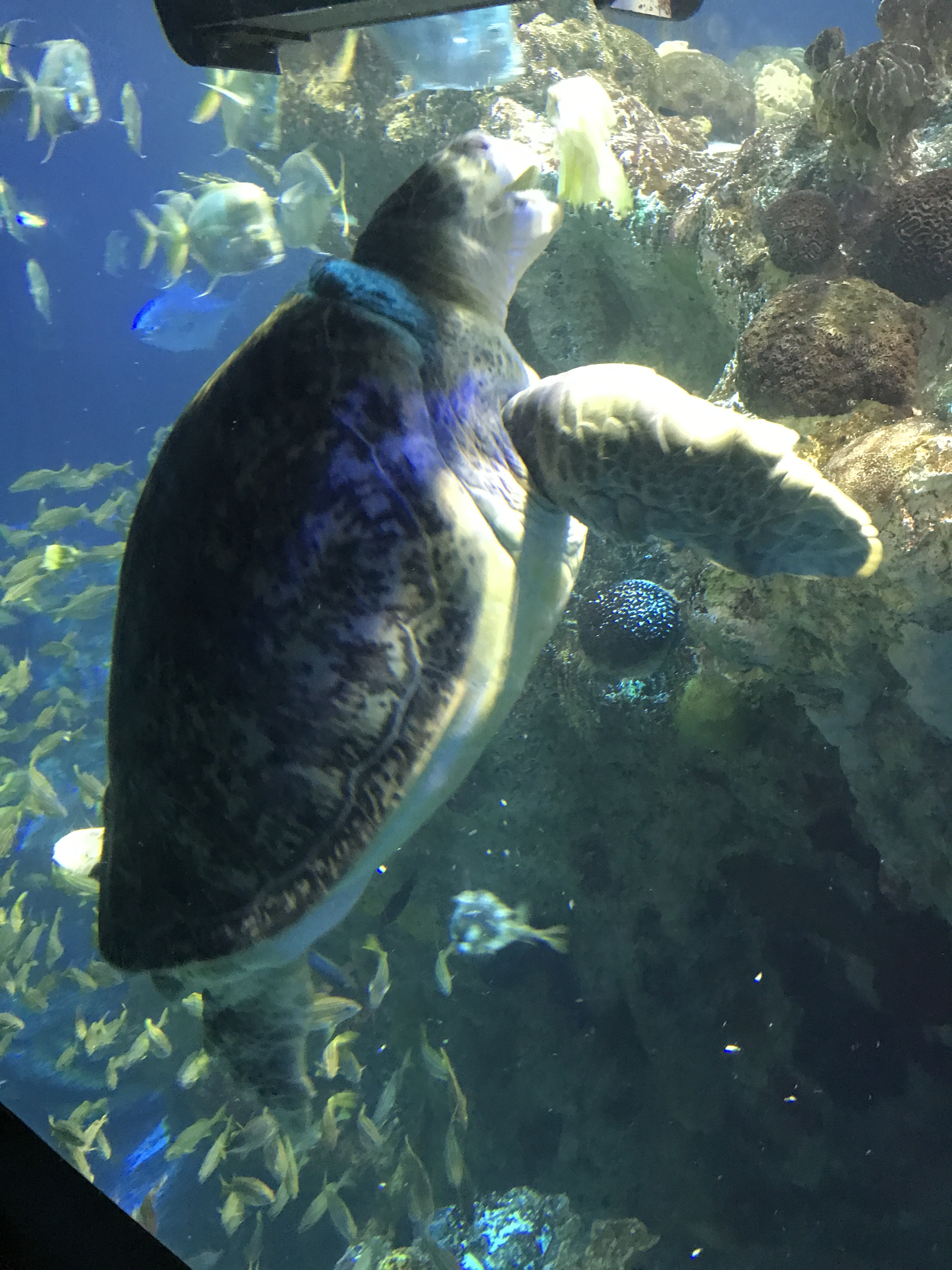
A sea-turtle eating lettuce.

The loggerhead, Kemp's ridley, olive ridley, and hawksbill sea turtles are omnivorous their entire life. Omnivorous turtles may eat a wide variety of plant and animal life including decapods, seagrasses, seaweed, sponges, mollusks, cnidarians, Echinoderms, worms and fish. However, some species specialize on certain prey.

The diet of green sea turtles changes with age. Juveniles are omnivorous, but as they mature they become exclusively herbivorous. This diet shift has an effect on the green sea turtle's morphology. Green sea turtles have a serrated jaw that is used to eat sea grass and algae.

Leatherback sea turtles feed almost exclusively on jellyfish and help control jellyfish populations.

Hawksbill sea turtles principally eat sponges, which constitute 70–95 % of their diets in the Caribbean.

Loggerhead turtles are regarded as flexible and predators of slow-moving animals. They eat a broad variety of things, including terrestrial insects like ants, planthoppers, and beetles, as well as sea animals and plants. This species' primary diet consists of gelatinous creatures (medusae and ctenophores) and crustaceans, particularly crabs. Sargassum, barnacles, gastropods, anemones, salps, and pelagic coelenterates have also been found in numerous studies to be loggerhead turtles' primary food sources.

=== Larynx mechanisms ===
There was little information regarding the sea turtle's larynx. Sea turtles, like other turtle species, lack an epiglottis to cover the larynx entrance. Key findings from an experiment reveal the following in regards to the larynx morphology: a close apposition between the linguolaryngeal cleft's smooth mucosal walls and the laryngeal folds, a dorsal part of the glottis, the glottal mucosa attached to the arytenoid cartilage, and the way the hyoid sling is arranged and the relationship between the compressor laryngis muscle and cricoid cartilage. The glottal opening and closing mechanisms have been examined. During the opening stage, two abductor artytenoideae muscles swing arytenoid cartilages and the glottis walls. As a result, the glottis profile is transformed from a slit to a triangle. In the closing stage, the tongue is drawn posteriorly due to the close apposition of the glottis walls and linguolaryngeal cleft walls and hyoglossal sling contractions.

=== Relationship with humans ===
Sea turtles are caught worldwide, although it is illegal to hunt most species in many countries. A great deal of intentional sea turtle harvests worldwide are for food. Many parts of the world have long considered sea turtles to be fine dining. In England during the 1700s, sea turtles were consumed as a delicacy to near extinction, often as turtle soup. Ancient Chinese texts dating to the 5th century BCE describe sea turtles as exotic delicacies. Many coastal communities around the world depend on sea turtles as a source of protein, often harvesting several sea turtles at once and keeping them alive on their backs until needed. Coastal peoples gather sea turtle eggs for consumption.

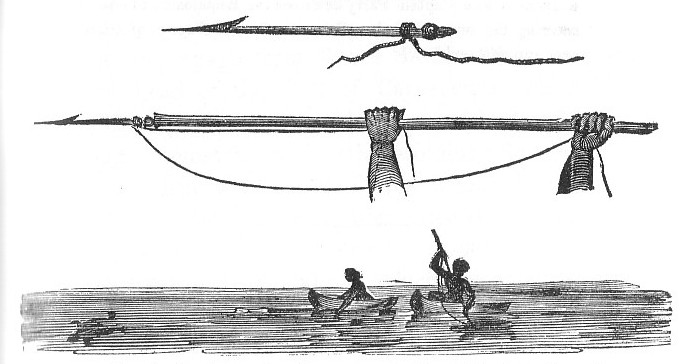
"Manner in which Natives of the East Coast strike turtle". Near Cooktown, Australia. From Phillip Parker King's Survey. 1818.

To a much lesser extent, some species are targeted for their shells. Tortoiseshell, a traditional decorative ornamental material used in Japan and China, comes from the carapace scutes of the hawksbill sea turtle. Ancient Greeks and ancient Romans processed sea turtle scutes (primarily from the hawksbill sea turtle) for various articles and ornaments used by their elites, such as combs and brushes. The skin of the flippers is prized for use as shoes and assorted leather goods. In various West African countries, sea turtles are harvested for traditional medicinal use.

The Moche people of ancient Peru worshipped the sea and its animals. They often depicted sea turtles in their art. J. R. R. Tolkien's poem "Fastitocalon" echoes a second-century Latin tale in the Physiologus of the Aspidochelone ("round-shielded turtle"); it is so large that sailors mistakenly land and light a fire on its back, and are drowned when it dives.

Beach towns, such as Tortuguero, Costa Rica, have transitioned from a tourism industry that made profits from selling sea turtle meat and shells to an ecotourism-based economy. Tortuguero is considered to be the founding location of sea turtle conservation. In the 1960s the cultural demand for sea turtle meat, shells, and eggs was quickly killing the once-abundant sea turtle populations that nested on the beach. The Caribbean Conservation Corporation began working with villagers to promote ecotourism as a permanent substitute to sea turtle hunting. Sea turtle nesting grounds became sustainable. Tourists love to come and visit the nesting grounds, although it causes a lot of stress to the sea turtles because all of the eggs can get damaged or harmed. Since the creation of a sea turtle ecotourism-based economy, Tortuguero annually houses thousands of tourists who visit the protected 35-kilometre (22 mi) beach that hosts sea turtle walks and nesting grounds. Walks to observe the nesting sea turtles require a certified guide and this controls and minimizes disturbance of the beaches. It also gives the locals a financial interest in conservation and the guides now defend the sea turtles from threats such as poaching; efforts in Costa Rica's Pacific Coast are facilitated by a nonprofit organization, Sea Turtles Forever. Thousands of people are involved in sea turtle walks, and substantial revenues accrue from the fees paid for the privilege.

In other parts of the world where sea turtle breeding sites are threatened by human activity, volunteers often patrol beaches as a part of conservation activities, which may include relocating sea turtle eggs to hatcheries, or assisting hatching sea turtles in reaching the ocean. Locations in which such efforts exist include the east coast of India, São Tomé and Príncipe, Sham Wan in Hong Kong, and the coast of Florida.

=== Importance to ecosystems ===
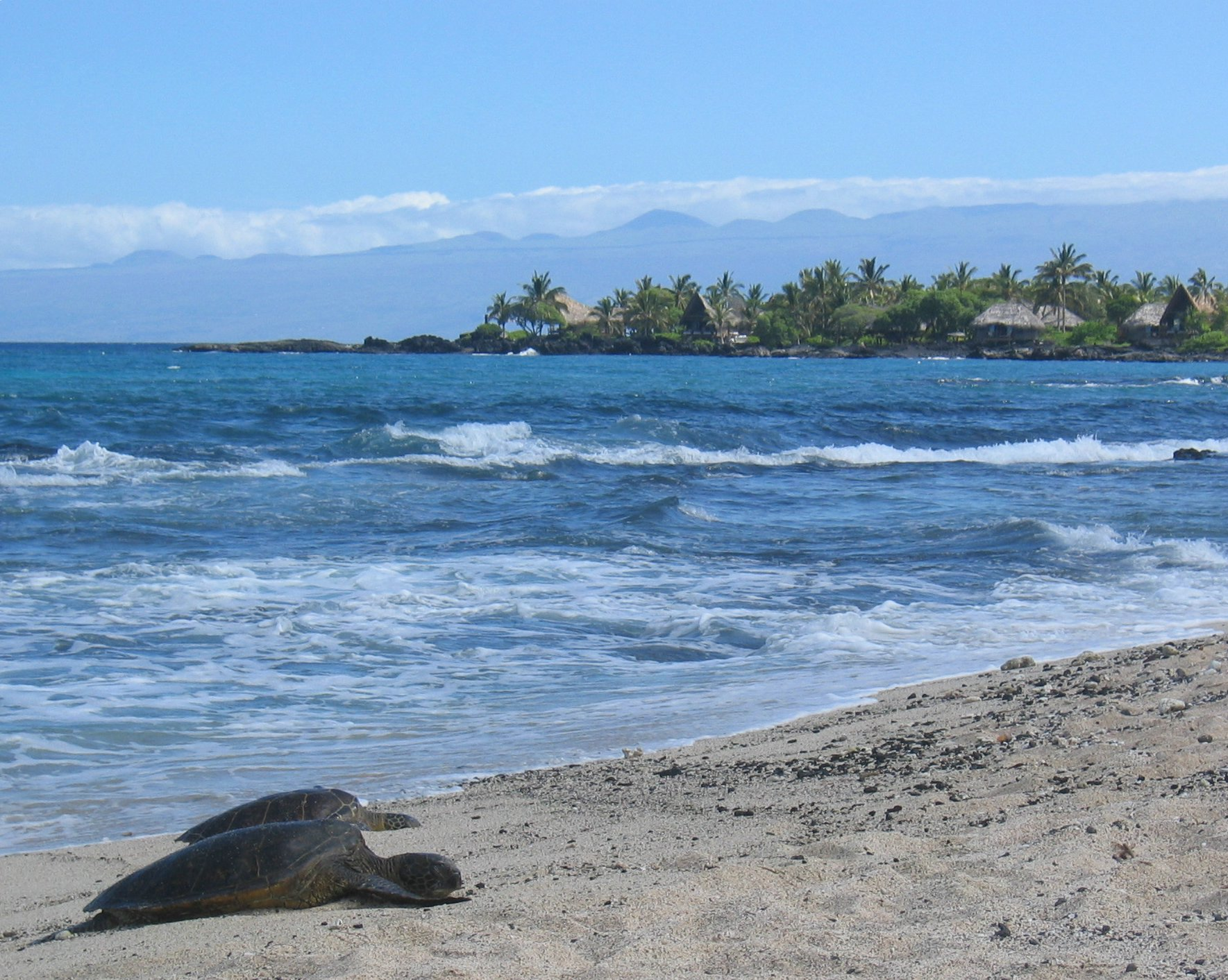
Sea turtles on a beach in Hawaii

Sea turtles play key roles in two habitat types: oceans and beaches/dunes.

In the oceans, sea turtles, especially green sea turtles, are among the very few creatures (manatees are another) that eat sea grass. Sea grass needs to be constantly cut short to help it grow across the sea floor. Sea turtle grazing helps maintain the health of the sea grass beds. Sea grass beds provide breeding and developmental grounds for numerous marine animals. Without them, many marine species humans harvest would be lost, as would the lower levels of the food chain. The reactions could result in many more marine species eventually becoming endangered or extinct.

Sea turtles use beaches and sand dunes as to lay their eggs. Such coastal environments are nutrient-poor and depend on vegetation to protect against erosion. Eggs, hatched or unhatched, and hatchlings that fail to make it into the ocean are nutrient sources for dune vegetation and therefore protecting these nesting habitats for sea turtles, forming a positive feedback loop.

Sea turtles also maintain a symbiotic relationship with yellow tang, in which the fish will eat algae growing on the shell of a sea turtle.

=== Conservation status and threats ===
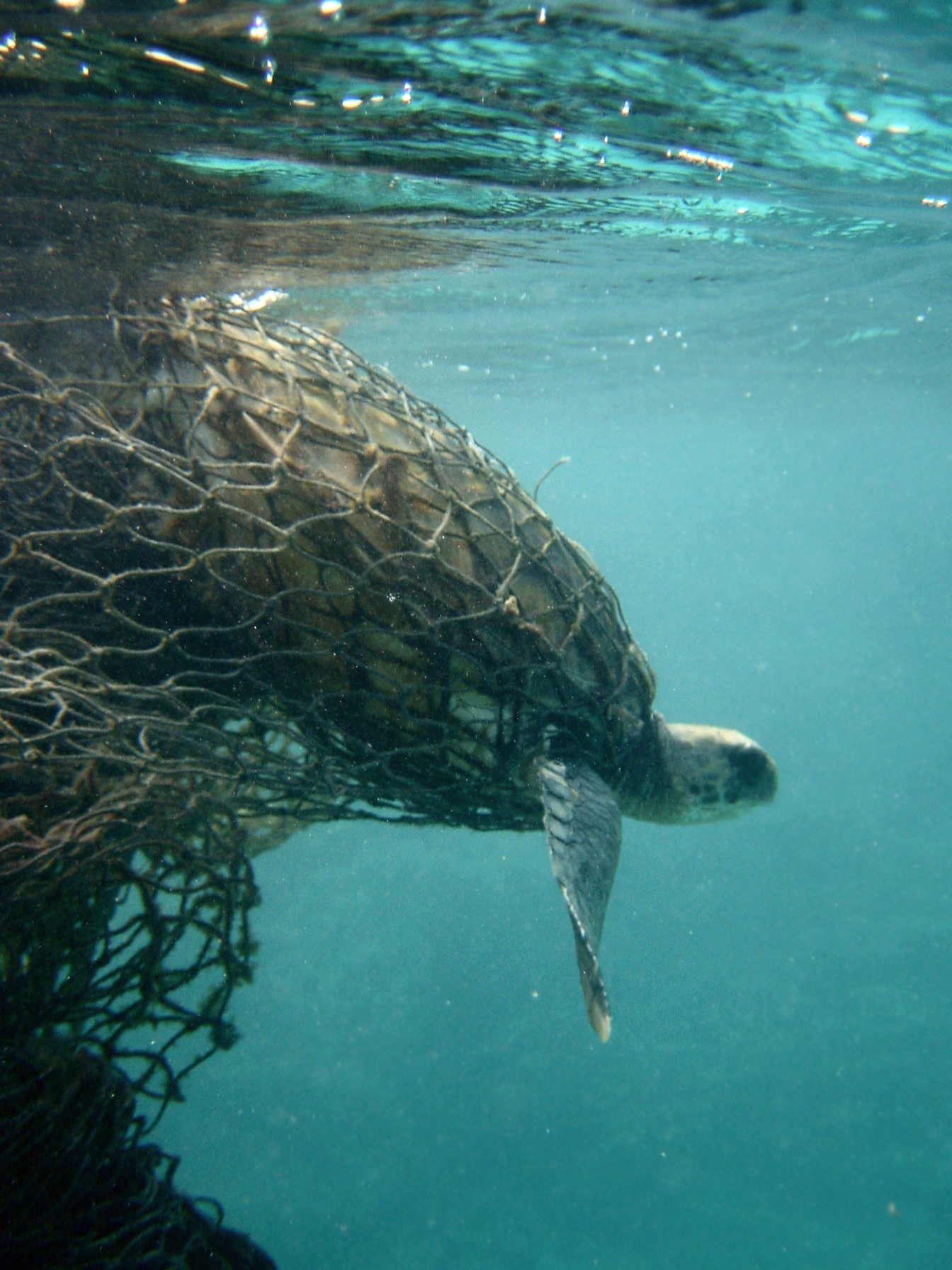
A sea turtle entangled in a fishing net

The IUCN Red List classifies two species of sea turtle as "critically endangered". An additional three species are classified as "vulnerable". The green turtle was considered "endangered", but a new ICUN assessment in 2025 put the classification status as "least concern". The flatback sea turtle is considered as "data deficient", meaning that its conservation status is unclear due to lack of data. All species of sea turtle are listed in CITES Appendix I, restricting international trade of sea turtles and sea turtle products. However, the usefulness of global assessments for sea turtles has been questioned, particularly due to the presence of distinct genetic stocks and spatially separated regional management units (RMUs). Each RMU is subject to a unique set of threats that generally cross jurisdictional boundaries, resulting in some sub-populations of the same species' showing recovery while others continue to decline. This has triggered the IUCN to conduct threat assessments at the sub-population level for some species recently. These new assessments have highlighted an unexpected mismatch between where conservation relevant science has been conducted on sea turtles, and where there is the greatest need for conservation. For example, as at August 2017, about 69% of studies using stable isotope analysis to understand the foraging distribution of sea turtles have been conducted in RMUs listed as "least concern" by the IUCN. Additionally, all populations of sea turtles that occur in United States waters are listed as threatened or endangered by the US Endangered Species Act (ESA). The US listing status of the loggerhead sea turtle is under review as of 2012.

	IUCN Red List	United States ESA^{*}
Green	Least concern (formerly Endangered)	Endangered: populations in Florida and Pacific coast of Mexico populations Threatened: all other populations
Loggerhead	Vulnerable	Endangered: NE Atlantic, Mediterranean, N Indian, N Pacific, S Pacific populations Threatened: NW Atlantic, S Atlantic, SE Indo-Pacific, SW Indian populations
Kemp's ridley	Critically endangered	Endangered: all populations
Olive ridley	Vulnerable	Endangered: Pacific Coast of Mexico population Threatened: all other populations
Hawksbill	Critically endangered	Endangered: all populations
Flatback	Data deficient	N/A
Leatherback	Vulnerable	Endangered: all populations

^{*}The ESA manages sea turtles by population and not by species.

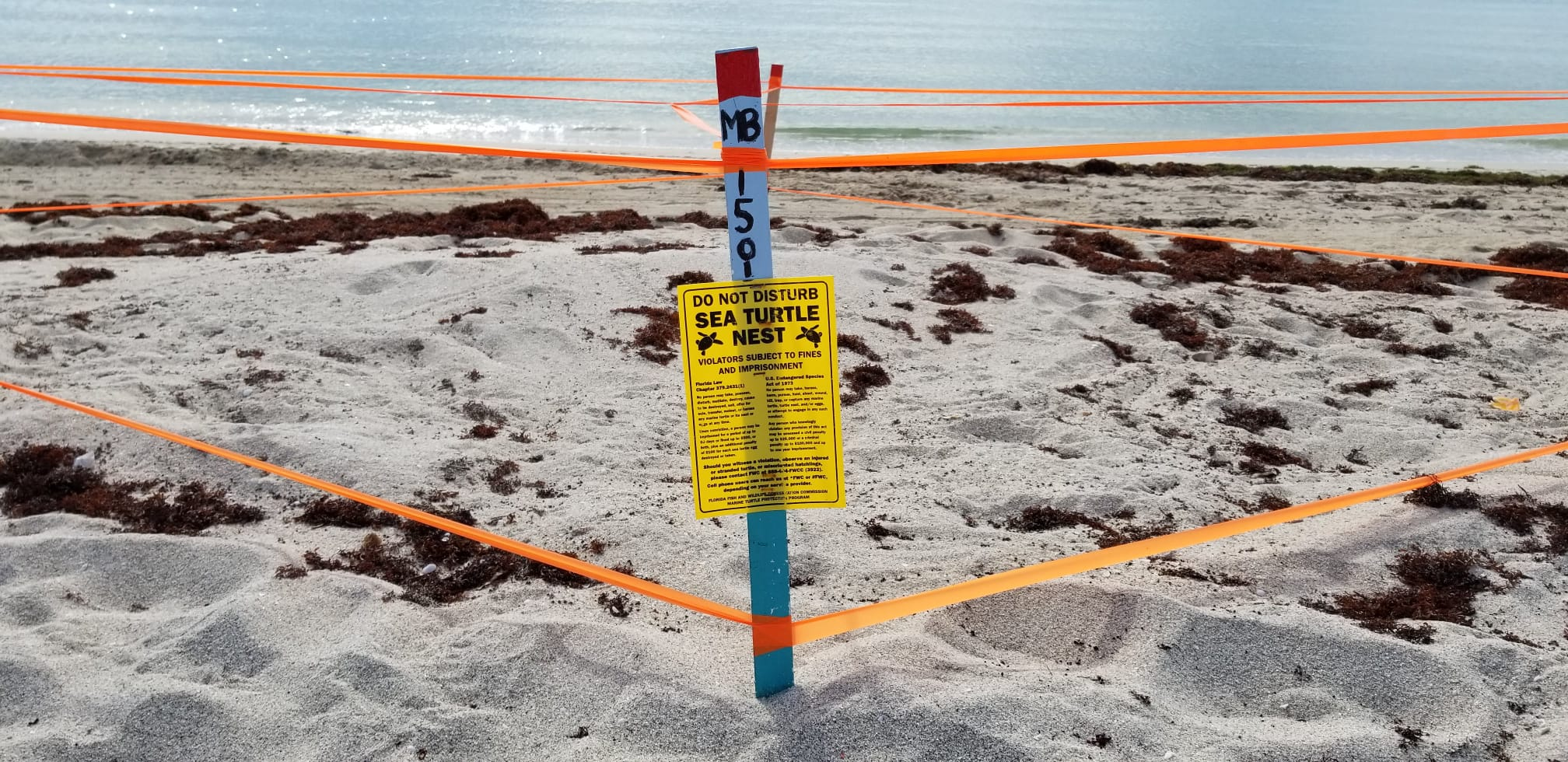
Protected nesting area for turtles in Miami, Florida

==== Management ====
In the Caribbean, researchers are having some success in assisting a comeback. In September 2007, Corpus Christi, Texas, wildlife officials found 128 Kemp's ridley sea turtle nests on Texas beaches, a record number, including 81 on North Padre Island (Padre Island National Seashore) and four on Mustang Island. Wildlife officials released 10,594 Kemp's ridley sea turtle hatchlings along the Texas coast in recent years.

The Philippines has had several initiatives dealing with the issue of sea turtle conservation. In 2007, the province of Batangas declared the catching and eating of sea turtles (locally referred to as Pawikans) illegal. However, the law seems to have had little effect as sea turtle eggs are still in demand in Batangan markets. In September 2007, several Chinese poachers were apprehended off the Turtle Islands in the country's southernmost province of Tawi-Tawi. The poachers had collected more than a hundred sea turtles, along with 10,000 sea turtle eggs.

Evaluating the progress of conservation programs is difficult, because many sea turtle populations have not been assessed adequately. Most information on sea turtle populations comes from counting nests on beaches, but this does not provide an accurate picture of the whole sea turtle population. A 2010 United States National Research Council report concluded that more detailed information on sea turtles' life cycles, such as birth rates and mortality, is needed.

Nest relocation may not be a useful conservation technique for sea turtles. In one study on the freshwater Arrau turtle (Podocnemis expansa) researchers examined the effects of nest relocation. They discovered that clutches of this freshwater turtle that were transplanted to a new location had higher mortality rates and more morphological abnormalities compared to non-transplanted clutches. However, in a study of loggerhead sea turtles (Caretta caretta), Dellert et al. found that relocating nests at risk of inundation increased the success of eggs and hatchlings and decreased the risk of inundation.

==== Predators and disease ====
Most sea turtle mortality happens early in life. Sea turtles usually lay around 100 eggs at a time, but on average only one of the eggs from the nest will survive to adulthood. Raccoons, foxes, and seabirds may raid nests or hatchlings may be eaten within minutes of hatching as they make their initial run for the ocean. Once in the water, they are susceptible to seabirds, large fish and even other sea turtles.

Adult sea turtles have few predators. Large aquatic carnivores such as sharks and crocodiles are their biggest threats; however, reports of terrestrial predators attacking nesting females are not uncommon. Jaguars have been reported to smash into sea turtle shells with their paws, and scoop out the flesh.

Fibropapillomatosis disease causes tumors in sea turtles.

While many of the things that endanger sea turtles are natural predators, increasingly many threats to the sea turtle species have arrived with the ever-growing presence of humans.

==== Bycatch ====
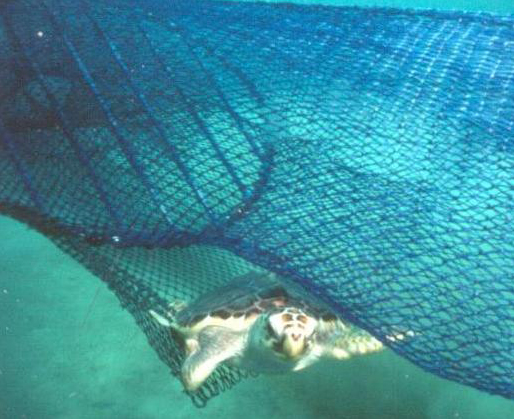
A loggerhead sea turtle exits from a fishing net through a turtle excluder device (TED)

One of the most significant and contemporary threats to sea turtles comes from bycatch due to imprecise fishing methods. Long-lining has been identified as a major cause of accidental sea turtle deaths. There is also a black-market demand for tortoiseshell for both decoration and supposed health benefits.

Sea turtles must surface to breathe. Caught in a fisherman's net, they are unable to surface and thus drown. In early 2007, almost a thousand sea turtles were killed inadvertently in the Bay of Bengal over the course of a few months after netting.

However, some relatively inexpensive changes to fishing techniques, such as slightly larger hooks and traps from which sea turtles can escape, can dramatically cut the mortality rate. Turtle excluder devices (TEDs) have reduced sea turtle bycatch in shrimp nets by 97 percent.

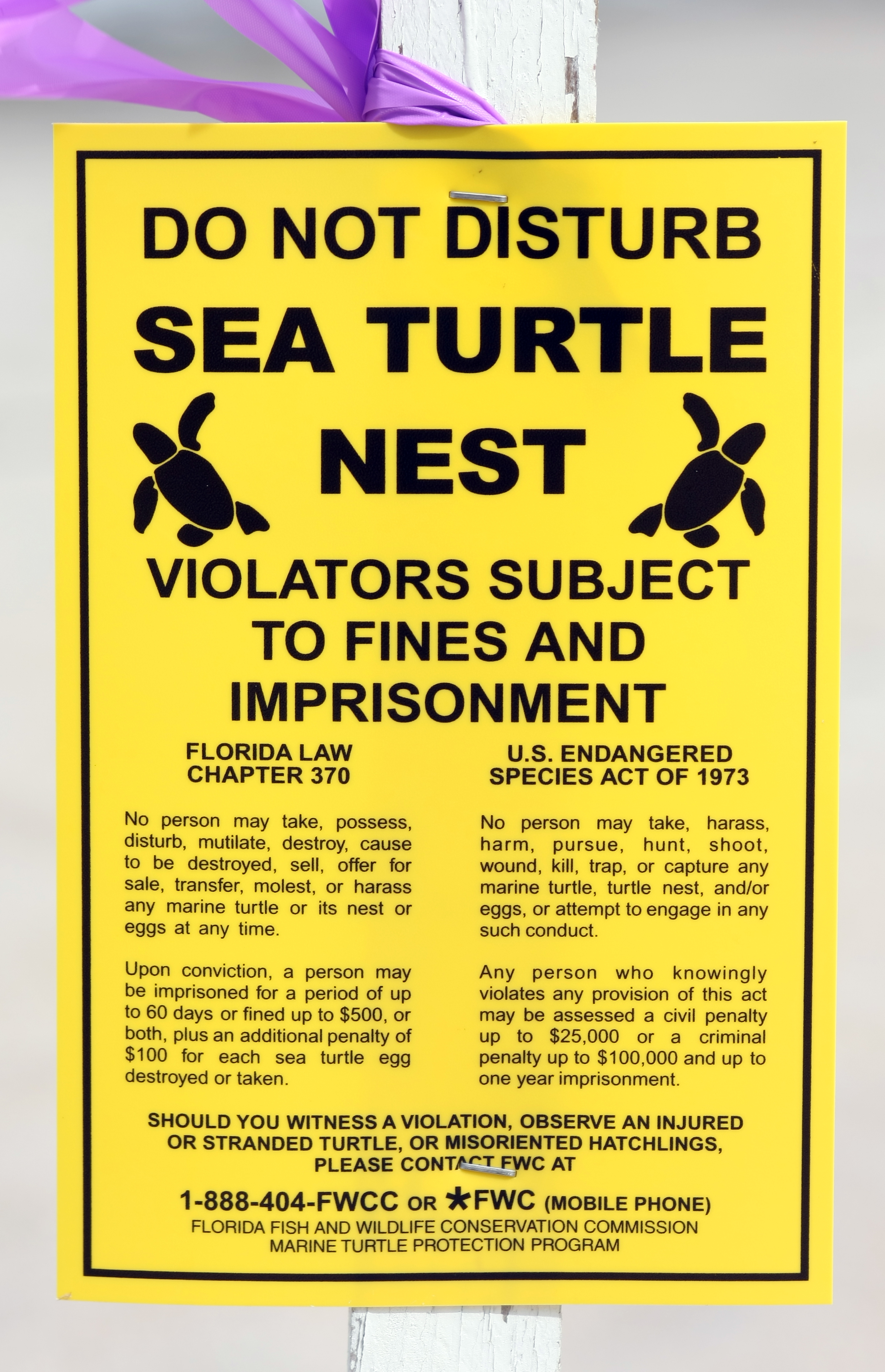
Legal notice posted by a sea turtle nest at Boca Raton, Florida

==== Beach development ====
Light pollution from beach development is a threat to baby sea turtles; the glow from city sources can cause them to head into traffic instead of the ocean. There has been some movement to protect these areas. On the east coast of Florida, parts of the beach known to harbor sea turtle nests are protected by fences. Conservationists have monitored hatchings, relocating lost baby sea turtles to the beach.

Hatchlings find their way to the ocean by instinctively crawling towards the brightest horizon, which has traditionally been the ocean because of the reflection of light from the moon and the stars on the water's surface, but get disoriented due to the artificial lights along the coastline. Lighting restrictions can prevent lights from shining on the beach and confusing hatchlings. Sea turtle-safe lighting uses red or amber LED light, invisible to sea turtles, in place of white light.

==== Poaching ====
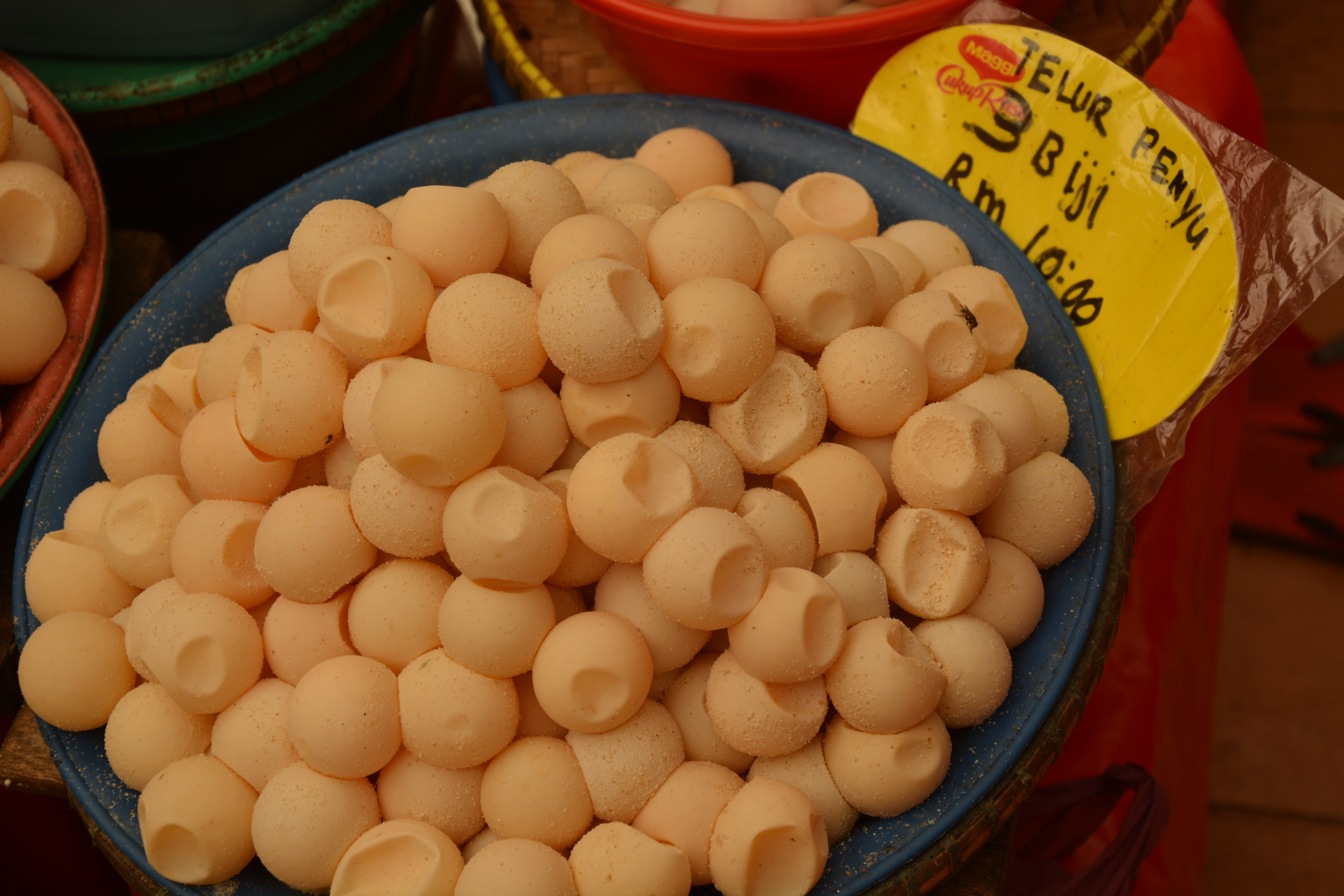
Sea turtle eggs sold in a market of Malaysia

Another major threat to sea turtles is the black-market trade in eggs and meat. This is a problem throughout the world, but especially a concern in China, the Philippines, India, Indonesia and the coastal nations of Latin America. Estimates reach as high as 35,000 sea turtles killed a year in Mexico and the same number in Nicaragua. Conservationists in Mexico and the United States have launched "Don't Eat Sea Turtle" campaigns in order to reduce this trade in sea turtle products. These campaigns have involved figures such as Dorismar, Los Tigres del Norte and Maná. Sea turtles are often consumed during the Catholic season of Lent, even though they are reptiles, not fish. Consequently, conservation organizations have written letters to the Pope asking that he declare sea turtles meat.

==== Marine debris ====
Another danger to sea turtles comes from marine debris, especially plastics, such as in the Great Pacific Garbage Patch, which may be mistaken for jellyfish, and abandoned fishing nets in which they can become entangled.

Sea turtles in all types are being endangered by the way humans use plastic. Recycling is known of and people recycle but not everyone does. The amount of plastic in the oceans and beaches is growing every day. The littering of plastic is 80% of the amount.

When turtles hatch from their eggs on the beach, they are already endangered with plastic. Turtles have to find the ocean by themselves and on their journey from land to sea, they encounter a lot of plastic. Some even get trapped in the plastic and die from lack of resources and from the sun being too hot.

Sea turtles eat plastic bags because they confuse them with their actual diet, jellyfish, algae and other components. The consumption of plastic is different for every breed of sea turtle, but when they ingest the plastic, it can clog their intestines and cause internal bleeding which will eventually kill them.

In 2015, an olive ridley sea turtle was found with a plastic drinking straw lodged inside its nose. The video of Nathan J. Robinson has helped raise considerable awareness about the threat posed by plastic pollution to sea turtles.

The research into turtle consumption of plastic is growing. A laboratory of Exeter and Plymouth Marine tested 102 turtles and found plastic in every one of their stomachs. The researchers found more than 800 pieces of plastic in those 102 turtles. That was 20 times more than what was found in the last research. Those researchers stated that the most common things found were cigarette buds, tire, plastic in many forms and fishing material.

The chemicals in the plastic that sea life eats damages their internal organs and can also clog their airway. The chemicals in the plastic that they eat is also a leading cause of the death of the turtles. If the turtles are close to laying eggs, the chemicals that they ingested from the plastic can seep into their eggs and affect their offspring. It is unlikely for the baby sea turtles to survive with those chemicals in their system.

There is a large quantity of plastic in the ocean, 80% of which comes from landfills; the ratio of plankton to plastic in the ocean is one to six. The Great Pacific Garbage Patch is a swirl of garbage in the Pacific Ocean that is 6 m (20 ft) deep and contains 3.5 million tons of garbage. This is also known as the "plastic island".

==== Climate change ====
Climate change may also cause a threat to sea turtles. Since sand temperature at nesting beaches defines the sex of a sea turtle while developing in the egg, there is concern that rising temperatures may produce too many females. However, more research is needed to understand how climate change might affect sea turtle gender distribution and what other possible threats it may pose.

Studies have shown that climate change in the world is making sea turtles gender change. The study that was in January 2018 Current Biology "Environmental Warning and Feminization of One of the Largest Sea Turtle Populations in the World", showed how baby sea turtles were being born female a lot more than being born male. Scientists took blood samples from many baby sea turtles near the Great Barrier Reef. Prior to this study, the ratio of male to female was pretty normal. There was a little more female than there was male but it was enough to keep reproduction and life cycle normal. The study showed that there was 99% more female sea turtles then male.

The temperature of the sand has a big impact on the sex of the sea turtle. This is not common with other animals but it is with sea turtles. Warmer or hot sand usually makes the sea turtle female and the cooler the sand usually makes male. Climate change has made the temperatures much hotter than they should be. The temperature of the sand gets hotter every time it is time for sea turtles to lay their eggs. With that, adaption to the sand should occur but it would take generations for them to adapt to that one temperature. It would be hard because the temperature of the sand is always changing.

The sand temperature is not the only thing that impacts sea turtles. The rise of the sea levels messes with their memory. They have an imprinted map in their memory that shows where they usually give birth and go after they do. With the rise in water levels, that map is getting messed up and is hard for them to get back to where they started. It is also taking away their beaches that they lay their eggs on. Climate change also has an impact on the number of storms and the severity of them. Storms can wipe out the sea turtles nesting ground and take out the eggs that already laid. The rising level of water is also a way for the nesting grounds to disappear. Sea turtles maps and their nesting grounds getting destroyed is harmful to them. That is because with their maps being messed up and not being able to lay eggs where they usually do makes it hard for them to find a new place to nest. They usually stick to a schedule and the messing up of a schedule messes them up.

The temperature of the ocean is also rising. This impacts their diet and what they can eat. Coral reefs are majorly impacted by the rising temperatures and a lot of sea turtles' diet is coral reefs or in the coral reef. Most animals that live in coral reefs need the reefs to survive. With the reefs dying, the sea life around it also does, impacting many animals.

==== Oil spills ====
Sea turtles are very vulnerable to oil pollution, both because of the oil's tendency to linger on the water's surface, and because oil can affect them at every stage of their life cycle. Oil can poison the sea turtles upon entering their digestive system.

Sea turtles have a cycle that they follow from birth. The cycle depends on the sex of the turtle, but they follow it all the way through life. They start by hatching on the beach, they reach the water then move out to find food. They then start their breeding migration and then mate with another turtle. For females, they make their way to the beach to start it all over again. With males, they go back to feeding after mating and doing that over again. Oil spills can affect this cycle majorly. If the female was to go and lay eggs and ingest oil, the chemicals from the oil can get passed on to the offspring and will be hard for them to survive. The diet of the sea turtles can also be impacted by oil. If the things that they eat has oil on it or has ingested oil, it can get into their system and start attacking the insides of the turtle.

==== Rehabilitation ====
Injured sea turtles are rescued and rehabilitated (and, if possible, released back to the ocean) by professional organizations, such as the Gumbo Limbo Nature Center in Boca Raton, Florida, the Karen Beasley Sea Turtle Rescue and Rehabilitation Center in Surf City, North Carolina, and Sea Turtles 911 in Hainan, China.

One rescued sea turtle, named Nickel for the coin that was found lodged in her throat, lives at the Shedd Aquarium in Chicago.

The goal of rehabilitation is to improve sea turtles' quality of life. Rehabilitation is often carried out using treatments intended to address any injuries or illnesses that a turtle may be suffering from. Another option is analgesia. Euthanasia frequently relieves the pain of sea turtles who are seriously ill or damaged.

Sea turtles can be returned to the wild if their rehabilitation is complete and they are in optimal health. The larger turtles are given a flipper tag and a passive integrated transponder (PIT) prior to being released. Despite having identifying tags, the turtles' living conditions often make it difficult to determine the results of rehabilitation.

=== Symbiosis with barnacles ===
Sea turtles are believed to have a commensal relationship with some barnacles, in which the barnacles benefit from growing on sea turtles without harming them. Barnacles are small, hard-shelled crustaceans found attached to multiple different substrates below or just above the ocean. The adult barnacle is a sessile organism; however, in its larval stage it is planktonic and can move about the water column. The larval stage chooses where to settle and ultimately the habitat for its full adult life, which is typically between 5 and 10 years. However, estimates of age for a common sea turtle barnacle species, Chelonibia testudinaria, suggest that this species lives for at least 21 months, with individuals older than this uncommon. Chelonibia barnacles have also been used to distinguish between the foraging areas of sea turtle hosts. By analyzing stable isotope ratios in barnacle shell material, scientist can identify differences in the water (temperature and salinity) that different hosts have been swimming through and thus differentiate between the home areas of host sea turtles.

A favorite settlement for barnacle larvae is the shell or skin around the neck of sea turtles. The larvae glue themselves to the chosen spot, a thin layer of flesh is wrapped around them and a shell is secreted. Many species of barnacles can settle on any substrate; however, some species of barnacles have an obligatory commensal relationship with specific animals, which makes finding a suitable location harder. Around 29 species of "turtle barnacles" have been recorded. However, it is not solely on sea turtles that barnacles can be found; other organisms also serve as a barnacle's settlements. These organisms include mollusks, whales, decapod crustaceans, manatees and several other groups related to these species.

Sea turtle shells are an ideal habitat for adult barnacles for three reasons. Sea turtles tend to live long lives, greater than 70 years, so barnacles do not have to worry about host death. However, mortality in sea turtle barnacles is often driven by their host shedding the scutes on which the barnacle is attached, rather than the death of the sea turtle itself. Secondly, barnacles are suspension feeders. Sea turtles spend most of their lives swimming and following ocean currents and as water runs along the back of the sea turtle's shell it passes over the barnacles, providing an almost constant water flow and influx of food particles. Lastly, the long distances and inter-ocean travel these sea turtles swim throughout their lifetime offers the perfect mechanism for dispersal of barnacle larvae. Allowing the barnacle species to distribute themselves throughout global waters is a high fitness advantage of this commensalism.

This relationship, however, is not truly commensal. While the barnacles are not directly parasitic to their hosts, they have negative effects to the sea turtles on which they choose to reside. The barnacles add extra weight and drag to the sea turtle, increasing the energy it needs for swimming and affecting its ability to capture prey, with the effect increasing with the quantity of barnacles affixed to its back.

== See also ==
- Cultural depictions of turtles
- Kélonia—sea turtle observatory in Réunion
- Memorandum of Understanding concerning Conservation Measures for Marine Turtles of the Atlantic Coast of Africa
- Memorandum of Understanding on the Conservation and Management of Marine Turtles and their Habitats of the Indian Ocean and South-East Asia
- Sandwatch
- Sea Turtle Association of Japan, Kuroshima Research Station
- Sea Turtle Conservancy
- Sea turtle migration
- Sea Turtles 911
- Shrimp-Turtle Case
- Threats to sea turtles
- Use of sea turtles in West African traditional medicine
