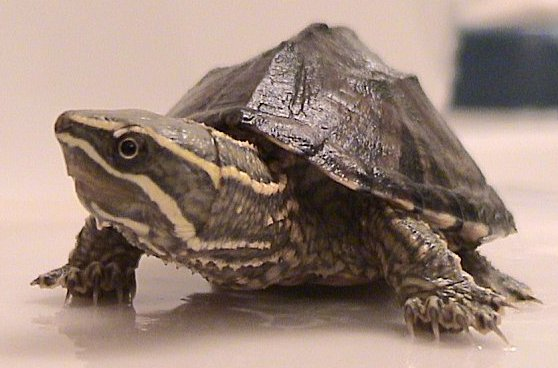
- Common musk turtle (Sternotherus odoratus), a species of the family Kinosternidae

Scientific classification
- Kingdom: Animalia
- Phylum: Chordata
- Class: Reptilia
- Order: Testudines
- Suborder: Cryptodira
- Clade: Americhelydia; Crawford et al., 2014

Subclades
- Chelydroidea; Chelydridae; Kinosternoidea; Dermatemydidae; Kinosternidae; Panchelonioidea; †Toxochelys; †Protostegidae?; †Ctenochelyidae; Chelonioidea

= Americhelydia =

Americhelydia Temporal range: Late Jurassic or Early Cretaceous to Holocene 149.5–0 Ma or 120–0 Ma

Clade of turtles

Americhelydia is a clade of turtles that consists of sea turtles, snapping turtles, the Central American river turtle and mud turtles, supported by several lines of molecular work. Prior to these studies some morphological and developmental work have considered sea turtles to be basal members of Cryptodira and kinosternids related to the trionychians in the clade Trionychoidea. Americhelydia and Testudinoidea, both clades within Durocryptodira (hardshell turtles), split apart during the early Cretaceous.
