= Sea turtles in West African traditional medicine =

Traditional medicine refers to the ethnomedical knowledge of societies based on local theory and belief. In West Africa, sea turtles are killed for use in traditional medicine.

West Africa

Many parts of a turtle's body are believed to have healing properties. For example, fat from leatherback turtles is used to treat numerous maladies, such as malaria, seizures and fever. A turtle's blood may be used to treat anemic patients, and their bones to heal those suffering from rickets. The skeletons of sea turtles are believed to aid in the growth of children in villages along the coast of Togo; thus the pulverized bones of sea turtles are sometimes added to a child's bath water. In Cape Verde, sea turtles are used for similar purposes. Islanders protect themselves from evil spirits by boiling a turtle's shell, then bathing in the water. The liver and gallbladder are preserved and used to treat numerous ailments, including anemia and hepatitis. Among Cape Verdean villagers, it is also believed that drinking a sea turtle's blood increases one's lifespan.

== Use of turtle body parts ==
When a turtle is killed, the animal's entire body is used for various belief use practices. Each section of the animal is utilized for a particular purpose and treats specific areas of one's body. Uses also vary between communities.

Skull and skeleton: treats aches and pains, increases strength, growth (Cape Verde)

Meat and eggs: treats malaria, indigestion (Cape Verde, Benin)

Genitalia: increased sexual performance, strength (Cape Verde)

Carapace and plastron: salvation from evil and witchcraft (Cape Verde)

Fat and oil: treats fainting, liver problems, arthritis, and pain relief (Cape Verde, Togo, Benin). Turtle oil is also used to induce vomiting (Togo, Benin).

Liver and gallbladder: treats anemia and hepatitis (Cape Verde)

Blood: increases lifespan, treats anemia and asthma (Cape Verde), rheumatism (Ghana)

== Harvest of turtles ==
The legal framework for sea turtle protection in West African governments is either underdeveloped or absent entirely, although many nations are beginning to address this. Thus, the harvesting of sea turtles is relatively rampant and unchecked, as laws considering turtle consumption are either absent or poorly enforced. Most fishing in West Africa is done from small watercraft rather than commercial vessels, making it increasingly difficult to enforce sea turtle conservation laws. However, all West African coastal nations are relatively recent signatories of international initiatives, such as the Convention on International Trade in Endangered Species of Wild Fauna and Flora (CITES) and the Convention on Biological Diversity (CBD), both of which seek to conserve sea turtle populations. Also, local initiatives are increasing in strength and number. One of the most prevalent of these is TAOLA, a sea turtle conservation network founded in Cape Verde in 2009.

As egg-laying females must deposit their eggs on the beach and bury them in the sand, poachers often allow turtles to lay their eggs on the beach, then kill the turtles and harvest their eggs. These animals and their eggs are then sold on black markets in coastal West African communities for subsistence and use in traditional customs.

== Effect on turtle populations ==
Along with bycatch from commercial fishing, small-scale harvesting for use in traditional medicine has decimated West African turtle populations. As the West African coast is home to some of the largest sea turtle populations in the world, it is one of the most ecologically important sites for sea turtle development.

On Boa Vista Island in Cape Verde, poachers have harvested up to ninety percent of loggerhead turtle eggs in certain areas; this has taken a toll on the reproductive success of the species.

== Remediation ==
A main proponent of sea turtle protection is the World Wildlife Fund (WWF), which works in conjunction with local governance to establish marine protected areas (MPAs). These are monitored to minimize the incursion of poachers and local harvesters for illegal killing and use of sea turtle eggs, meat, and other body parts. The WWF also trains local conservationists to patrol turtle nesting sites.

In order to make the most out of conservation efforts, it is important to consider the livelihoods of those affected by these efforts, rather than solely banning unsustainable use of turtle carcasses. Providing sustainable alternative means of sustenance is paramount in minimizing turtle poaching activity.

In Ada Foah, a Ghanaian coastal fishing town and key sea turtle nesting site, the use of social taboos has helped to protect sea turtle species, such that they are far less likely to be eaten or killed for other purposes. These are self-enforcing among communities which adhere to them, as many believe killing a sea turtle will result in hardship, pain, or even death for the offender. However, these taboos are localized to certain areas, such that citizens of neighboring communities and cities may not believe in them. In areas that do not believe in such taboos, the Ghana Wildlife Division (GWD) has increased turtle protection law enforcement in an effort to decrease sea turtle kill rates.
