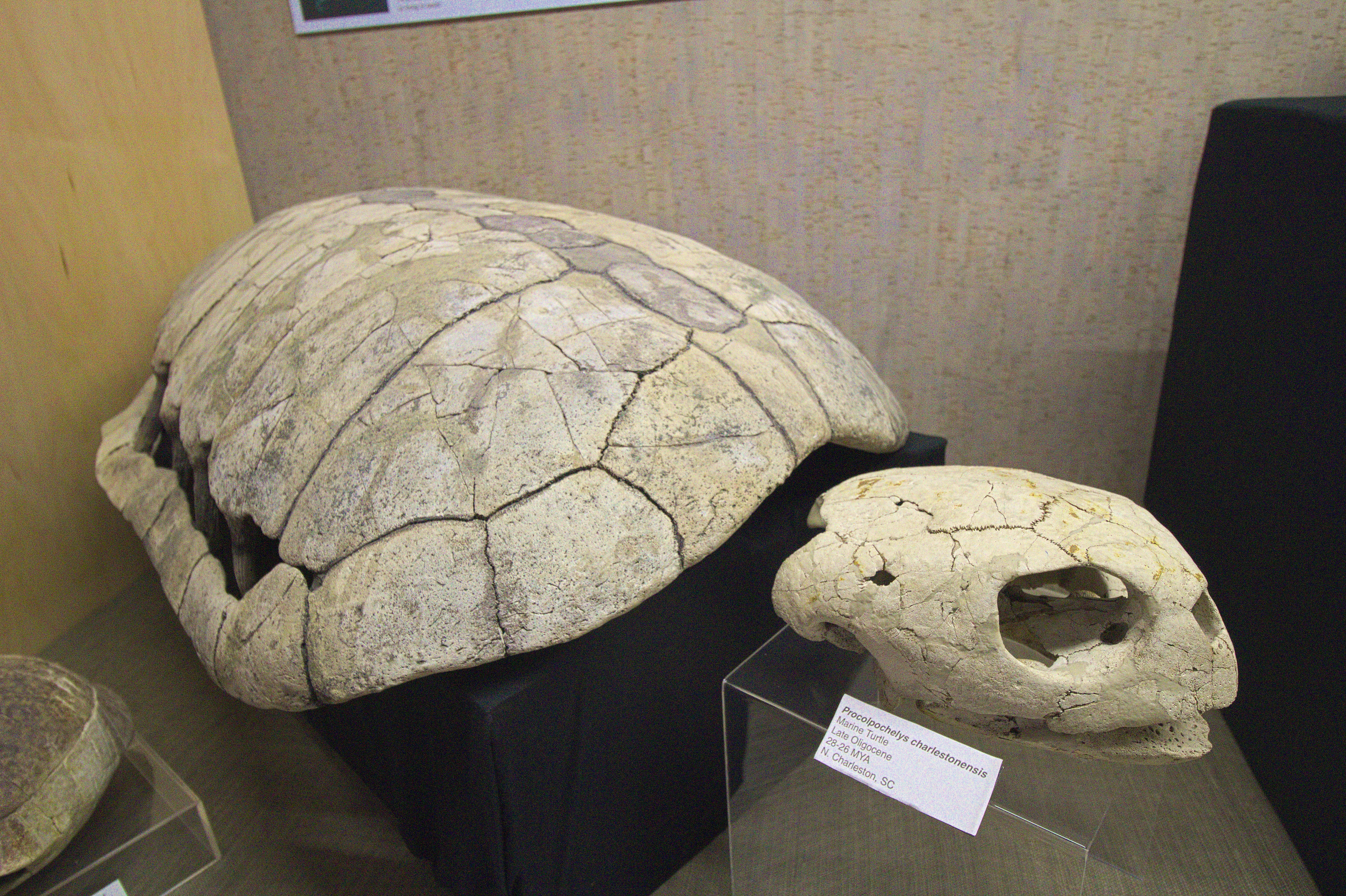
- Procolpochelys charlestonensis skull and shell at Mace Brown Museum of Natural History

Scientific classification
- Domain: Eukaryota
- Kingdom: Animalia
- Phylum: Chordata
- Class: Reptilia
- Order: Testudines
- Suborder: Cryptodira
- Clade: Pancheloniidae
- Genus: †Procolpochelys; Hay 1908

= Procolpochelys =

Procolpochelys Temporal range: 33.9–3.6 Ma

Extinct genus of turtles

Procolpochelys is an extinct genus of sea turtle from the Miocene of what is now Maryland, Virginia, and New Jersey. Its fossils have been found in the Calvert Formation. It was first named by Hay in 1908.
