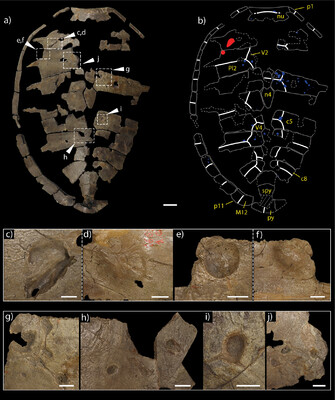
- Holotype of E. brabantica

Scientific classification
- Kingdom: Animalia
- Phylum: Chordata
- Class: Reptilia
- Order: Testudines
- Suborder: Cryptodira
- Family: Cheloniidae
- Genus: †Eochelone; Dollo, 1903

Type species
- †Eochelone brabantica

Species
- †Eochelone voltregana

= Eochelone =

Eochelone Temporal range: Eocene

Extinct genus of turtles

Eochelone is an extinct genus of sea turtle from the late Eocene. It was first named by Dollo in 1903. Its type species is E. brabantica.
