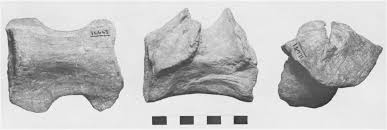
- Holotype vertebra ANSP 9225 seen from three different angles

Scientific classification
- Kingdom: Animalia
- Phylum: Chordata
- Class: Reptilia
- Order: Testudines
- Suborder: Cryptodira
- Family: †Protostegidae
- Genus: †Pneumatoarthrus; Cope, 1870
- Species: †P. peloreus

Binomial name
- †Pneumatoarthrus peloreus Cope, 1870

= Pneumatoarthrus =

Pneumatoarthrus Temporal range: Late Cretaceous, 70–68 Ma

Extinct genus of turtles

Pneumatoarthrus is an extinct genus of sea turtle known from the Late Cretaceous (early Maastrichtian) Mount Laurel Formation of Monmouth County, New Jersey. Many experts consider Pneumatoarthrus a senior synonym of Archelon. If this classification is correct, it would have reached 4-5 meters in length with a fin span of up to 5 meters, and weighed over 2.3 tons. Only a single species, P. peloreus, is known.

== Taxonomy ==
The holotype of Pneumatoarthrus, ANSP 9225, was originally identified as a sacrum belonging to Hadrosaurus by Joseph Leidy in an 1865 monograph on Cretaceous reptiles from the US. Edward Drinker Cope later identified it belonging to a dinosaur more closely related to Anchisaurus, Efraasia, and Clepsysaurus than to Dryptosaurus and Ornithopsis, and in his 1872 description of the sea turtle Protostega he decided that Pneumatoarthrus was likely a sea turtle as well, which he reiterated in his 1875 monograph on Cretaceous vertebrate fossils from the Western Interior. Later authors overlooked Cope's 1875 monograph and considered it either a theropod or a hadrosaur (Huene 1932 considered Pneumatoarthrus the sacral vertebrae of Dryptosaurus). Baird (1979) confirmed the protostegid identification of Pneumatoarthrus by Cope (1872, 1875) based on examination of ANSP 9225.
