= Microstega =

Microstega may refer to:

- Microstega, a genus of moths, now considered a junior synonym of Paratalanta
- Pseudopagyda homoculorum, a species of moth originally described as Microstega homoculorum
- Kansastega, a genus of protostegid sea turtle originally named Microstega
