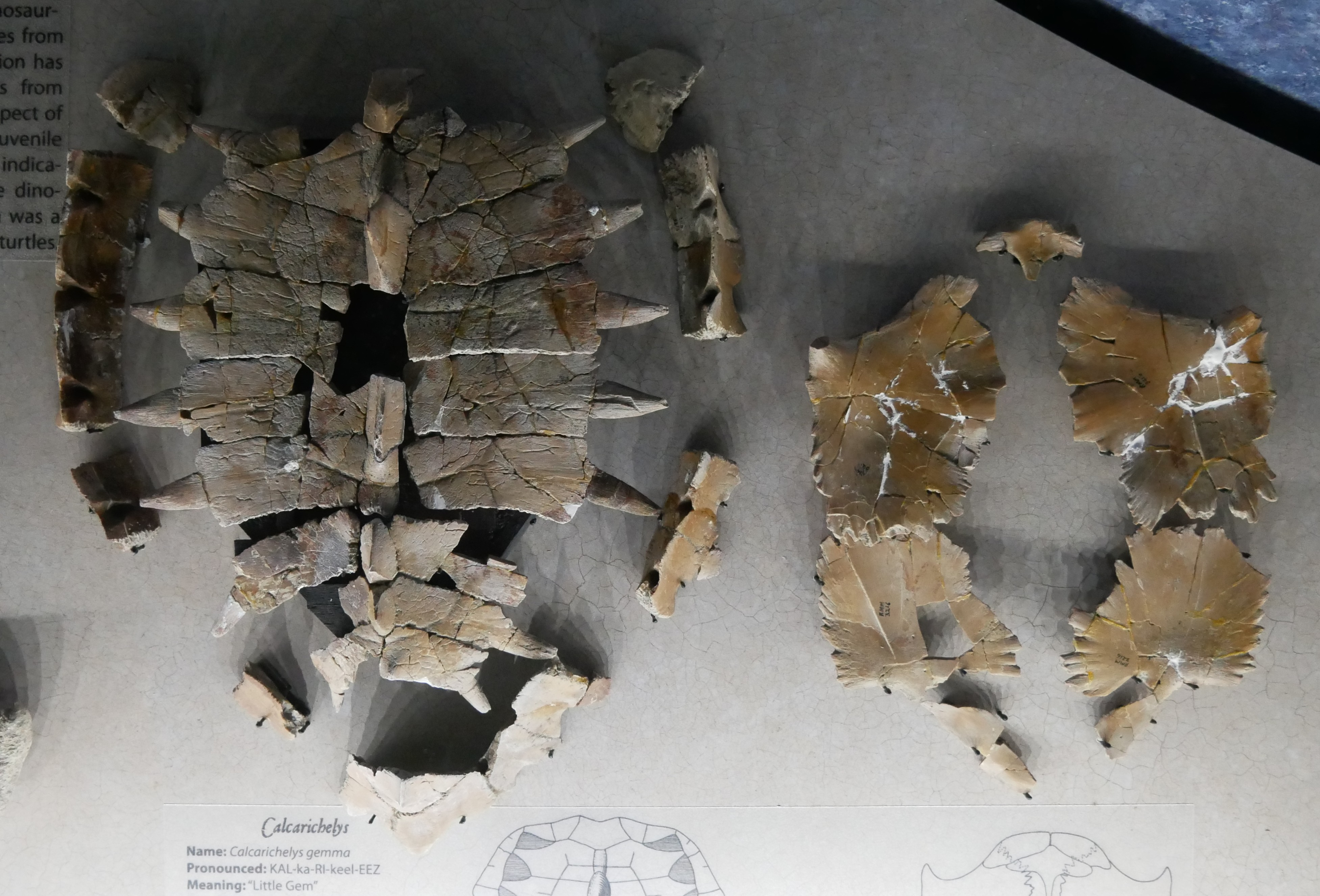
- Carapace and plastron, McWane Science Center

Scientific classification
- Kingdom: Animalia
- Phylum: Chordata
- Class: Reptilia
- Order: Testudines
- Suborder: Cryptodira
- Family: †Protostegidae
- Genus: †Calcarichelys; Zangerl, 1953

Type species
- Calcarichelys gemma Zangerl, 1953

= Calcarichelys =

Calcarichelys Temporal range: Campanian–Maastrichtian

Extinct genus of turtle

Calcarichelys ('spur turtle' or 'thorn turtle') is an extinct genus of protostegid turtle from the Late Cretaceous of the Selma Formation in Alabama, and possibly from Angola. It contains only one species, C. gemma. The species epithet "gemma" refers to the nickname "The Gem" given to the holotype by collector C. M. Barber due to its preservation quality.

== Discovery ==
The holotype specimen of Calcarichelys is known from Mooreville Chalk, Alabama. More complete specimens are later described from same formation. Another specimen that possibly belongs to Calcarichelys or related species is known from the Maastrichtian of Bentiaba, Angola.

== Description ==
Calcarichelys is a small protostegid, with a carapace length of 25.3 cm (10.0 in). It is probably closely related to Chelosphargis, as they share some characteristics. Unlike Chelosphargis, Calcarichelys is characterized by thornlike neural plates.
