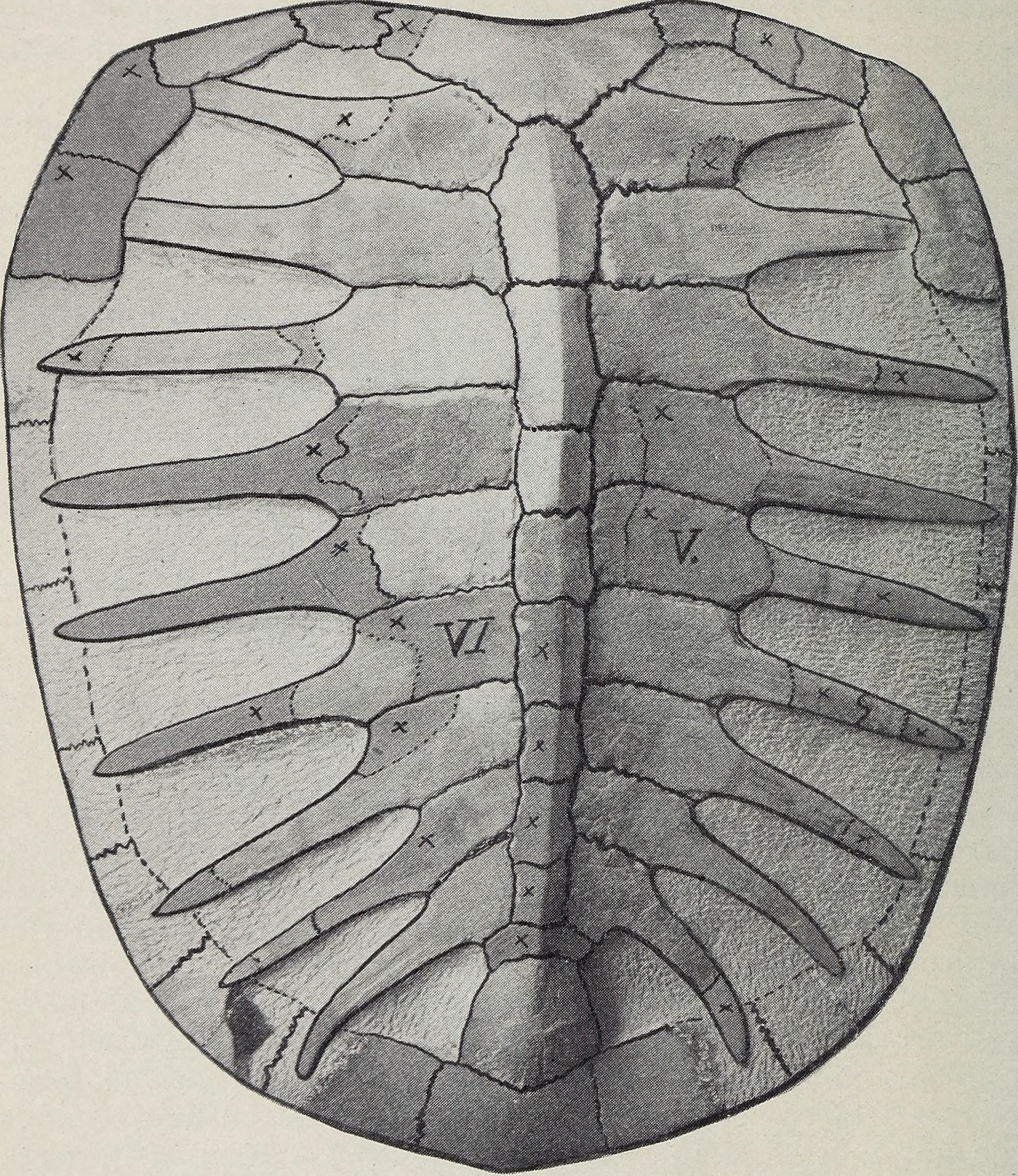
- Holotype shell of Kansastega copei

Scientific classification
- Kingdom: Animalia
- Phylum: Chordata
- Class: Reptilia
- Order: Testudines
- Suborder: Cryptodira
- Family: †Protostegidae
- Subfamily: †Protosteginae
- Tribe: †Protostegini
- Subtribe: †Kansastegina; McDavid & Hooks, 2023
- Genus: †Kansastega; McDavid & Hooks, 2023

Type species
- †Kansastega copei (Wieland, 1909)

Synonyms
- Genus synonymy: Microstega Hooks, 1998 (preoccupied by Microstega Meyrick, 1890); Species synonymy: Protostega copei Wieland, 1909; Archelon copei (Wieland, 1909); Microstega copei (Wieland, 1909)

= Kansastega =

Kansastega Temporal range: Santonian

Extinct genus of turtles

Kansastega is an extinct genus of protostegid sea turtles that lived during the Late Cretaceous. It contains one valid species, K. copei, which has been found in the Niobrara Formation of Kansas. It was originally named as a species of Protostega, then was moved to its own genus Microstega. However, that genus name was preoccupied by the moth Microstega. As a result, Kansastega was proposed as a replacement name.
