= Iserosaurus =

Iserosaurus Temporal range: Late Cretaceous, 90 Ma

Scientific classification
- Domain: Eukaryota
- Kingdom: Animalia
- Phylum: Chordata
- Class: Reptilia
- Order: Testudines
- Suborder: Cryptodira
- Family: †Protostegidae
- Genus: †Iserosaurus

Type species
- †Iserosaurus littoralis Fritsch, 1905

Extinct genus of turtles

Iserosaurus is an extinct genus of sea turtle from the Late Cretaceous of Czech Republic.

== Taxonomy ==
Iserosaurus was originally described as a new taxon of mosasauroid by Fritsch (1905) on the basis of a disarticulated skeleton from Turonian-age chalk deposits in Bohemia, Czech Republic. However, Persson (1963) tentatively listed it as a dubious plesiosaur in his overview of plesiosaur classification. Karl (2002) recognized Iserosaurus as being a protostegid turtle and assigned it to cf. Archelon. Kear et al. (2013) agreed with Karl (2002) that Iserosaurus is a marine turtle but noted differences from Archelon, so assigned the genus to Protostegidae indet.
