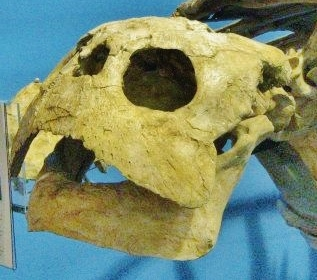
- Skull of specimen.

Scientific classification
- Kingdom: Animalia
- Phylum: Chordata
- Class: Reptilia
- Order: Testudines
- Suborder: Cryptodira
- Family: †Protostegidae
- Genus: †Alienochelys de Lapparent de Broin, 2014

Type species
- †Alienochelys selloumi de Lapparent de Broin, 2014

= Alienochelys =

Alienochelys Temporal range: Late Cretaceous, 70–66 Ma

Extinct genus of turtles

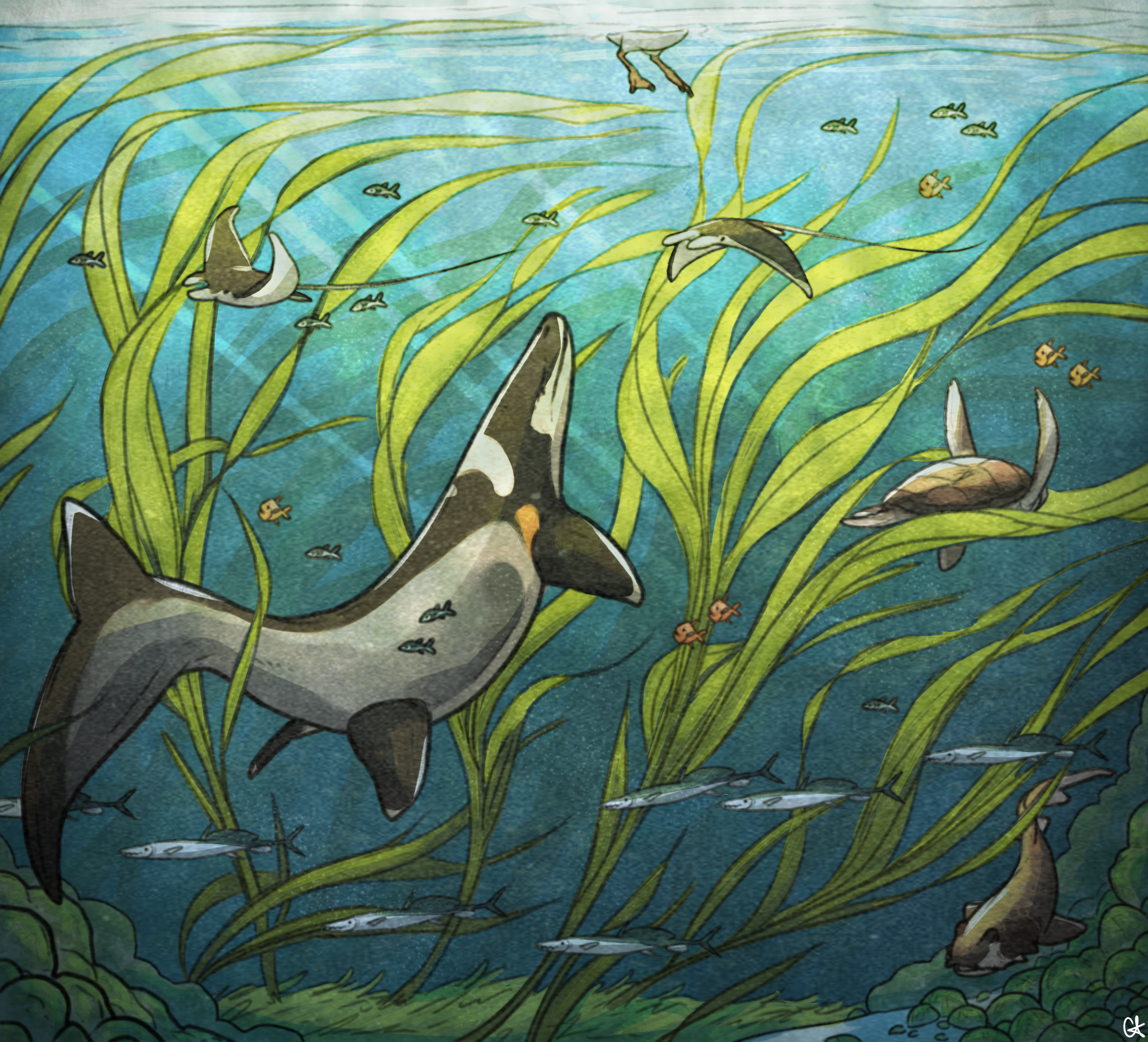
Life restoration of Alienochelys (middle right) and other animals of the Ouled Abdoun Basin

Alienochelys ("strange turtle") is an extinct genus of marine turtle known from Maastrichian-aged Cretaceous phosphates in Morocco. With a skull measuring 41.5 centimetres (1.36 ft) long, it would have been a very large turtle. It was first described as a member of the family Dermochelyidae, meaning that it is a relative of the modern leatherback turtle, though a 2018 study identifies it as a sister taxon of Ocepechelon belonging to the family Protostegidae, indicating that it may have been closer to the extinct Archelon. Unlike other sea turtles, Alienochelys' the jaws being adapted for a powerful crushing pattern well adapted for a durophagous lifestyle, as well as its unusual cranial characteristics.
