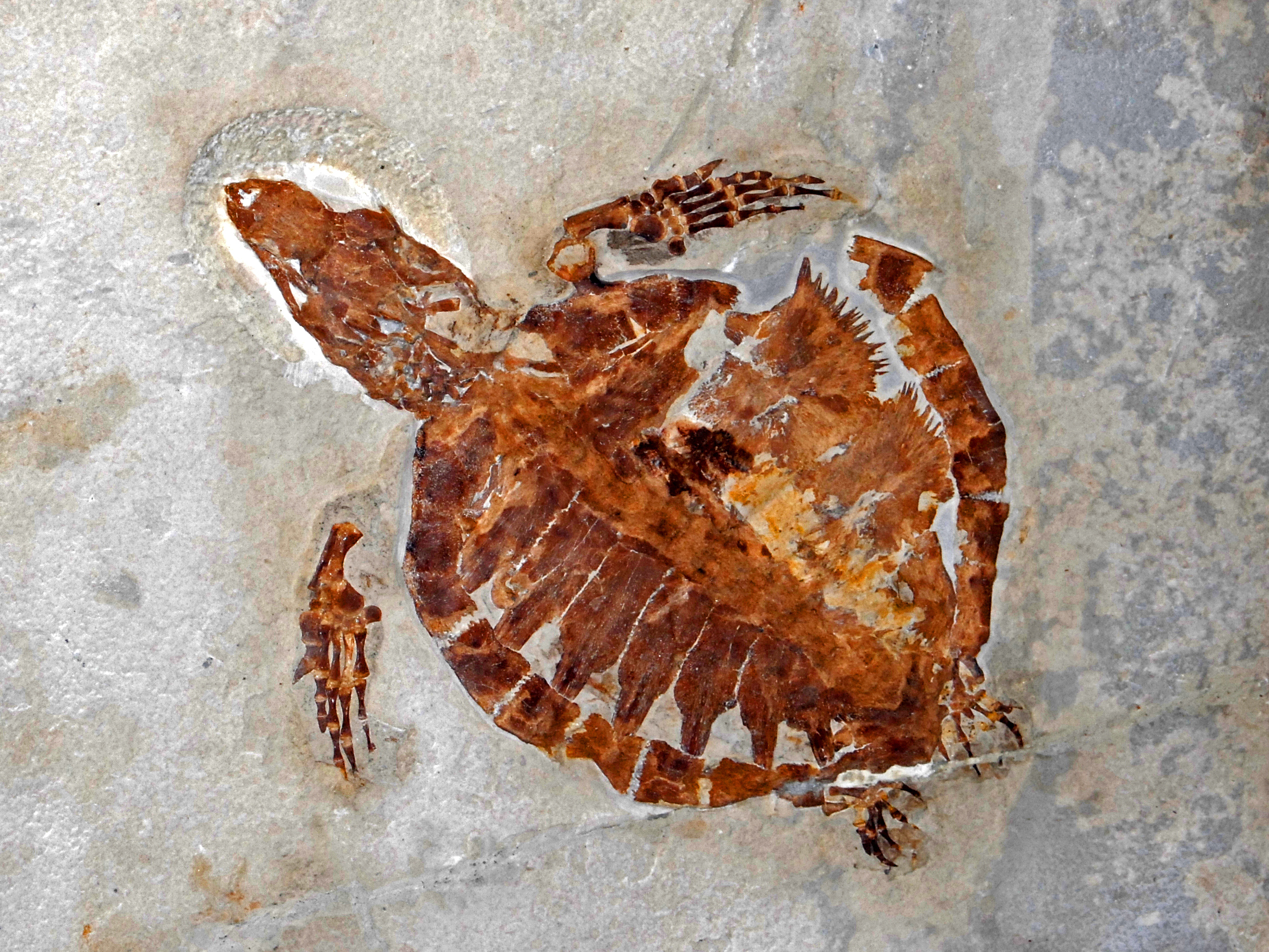
- Fossil of R. nammourensis

Scientific classification
- Kingdom: Animalia
- Phylum: Chordata
- Class: Reptilia
- Order: Testudines
- Suborder: Cryptodira
- Family: †Protostegidae
- Genus: †Rhinochelys; Seeley, 1869

Species
- See text

= Rhinochelys =

Rhinochelys Temporal range: Albian–Cenomanian

Extinct genus of turtles

Rhinochelys is an extinct genus of sea turtles belonging to the family Protostegidae.

== Fossil records ==
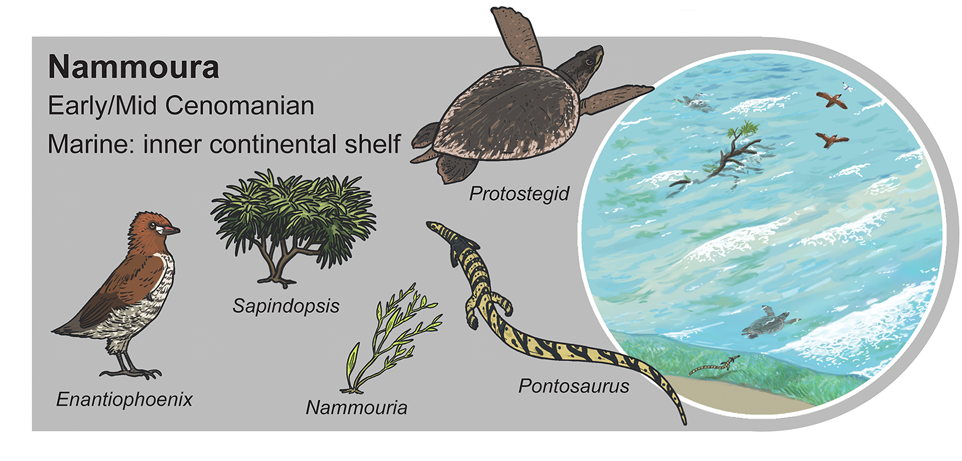
Flora, fauna and depositional environment of the Nammoura locality, including R. nammourensis

Fossils of Rhinochelys have been found in Late Albian to middle Cenomanian-age marine deposits of southern England, Lebanon, and France.

== Species ==
Three species of Rhinochelys are recognized:

- Rhinochelys pulchriceps (Owen, 1851)
- Rhinochelys amaberti Moret, 1935
- Rhinochelys nammourensis Tong, Hirayama, Makhoul & Escuillie, 2006

Rhinochelys cantabrigiensis and R. elegans, both named by Richard Lydekker in 1889, are recovered by Scavezzoni and Fischer (2018) as closer to Desmatochelys than to Rhinochelys and possibly are not congeneric with Rhinochelys.

== Bibliography ==
- Hirayama, R., 1997: Distribution and diversity of Cretaceous chelonioids. 225–243. in Callaway, J. M. & Nicholls, E. L., (eds.), 1997: Ancient marine reptiles. Academic Press, San Diego, London, Boston, New York, Sydney, Tokyo, Toronto, 1997, pp. xlvi - 501
- Moody, R. T. J., 1997: The paleogeography of marine and coastal turtles of the North Atlantic and Trans-Saharan regions. 259–278 in Callaway, J. M. & Nicholls, E. L., (eds.) 1997: Ancient Marine Reptiles. Academic Press, San Diego, London, Boston, New York, Sydney, Tokyo, Toronto, 1997, xlvi-501
