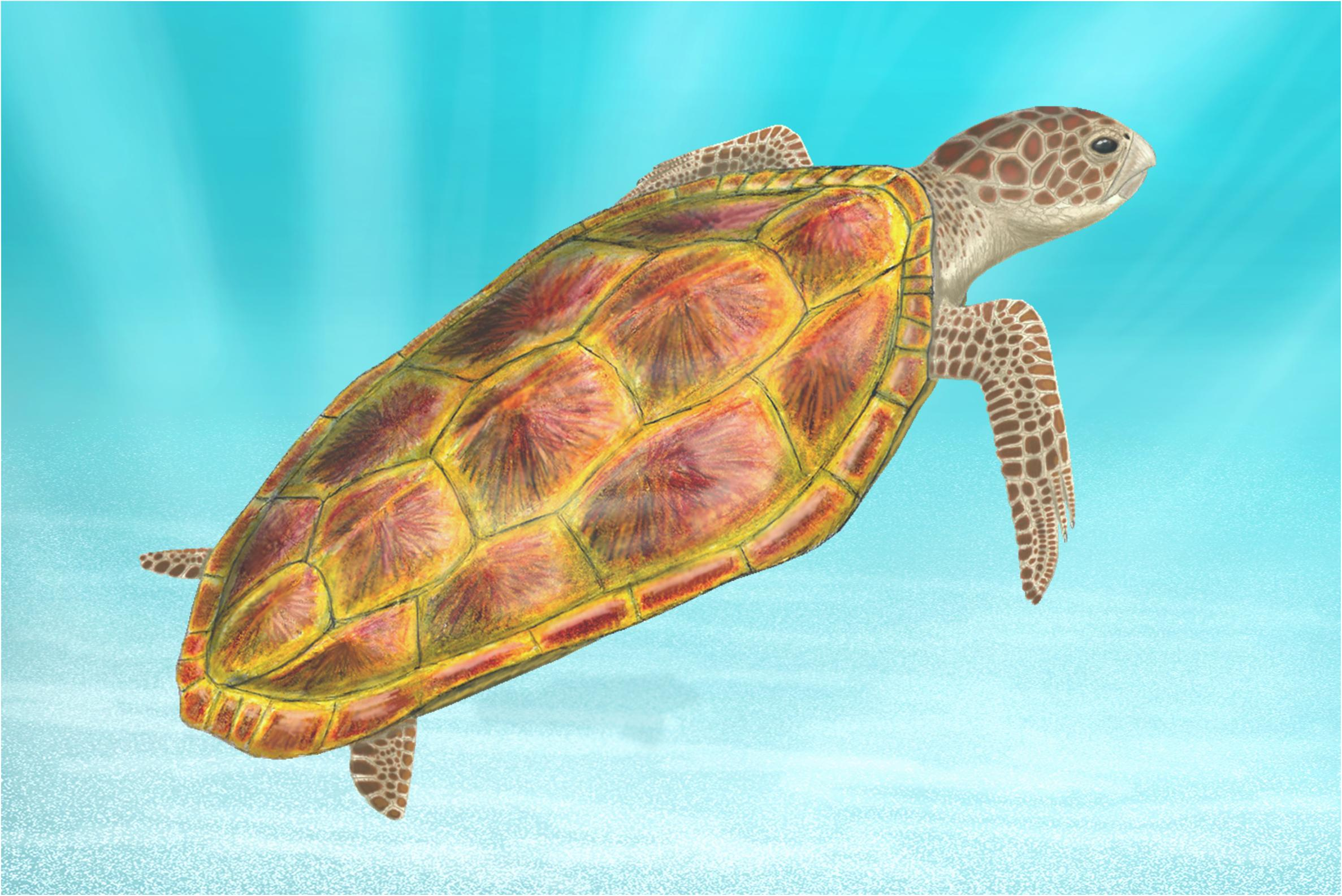

Scientific classification
- Kingdom: Animalia
- Phylum: Chordata
- Class: Reptilia
- Order: Testudines
- Suborder: Cryptodira
- Family: †Protostegidae
- Genus: †Santanachelys; Hirayama, 1998
- Species: †S. gaffneyi

Binomial name
- †Santanachelys gaffneyi Hirayama, 1998

= Santanachelys =

Santanachelys Temporal range: Aptian-Albian, 112 Ma

Extinct genus of turtles

Santanachelys gaffneyi is an extinct species of sea turtle. It is the only species in the genus Santanachelys, which itself is a member of the extinct family Protostegidae. The species was first described from a 20-centimeter long fossil specimen unearthed in 1998 from the Santana Formation of eastern Brazil. From the rock layer from which it was excavated, it was determined that the specimen was from the Early Cretaceous period (112 million years old). It is therefore one of the oldest known sea turtles. but a new fossil named Desmatochelys padillai in 2015 is estimated to be as old as 120 million years.

While the specimen showed many characteristics of modern sea turtles, it differed from the typical sea turtle body plan in several ways. One glaring difference is that Santanachelys had distinguishable digits at the tip of its forearms. Instead of the fully fused, hydrodynamic paddles that modern sea turtles possess, the early sea turtle's digits were distinct and movable similar to those of non-marine turtles. Like later sea turtles though, Santanachelys had large salt glands situated near its eyes, which aided in the excretion of excess salt. This was an adaptation to the highly saline marine environment.

Evolutionarily, the morphology of Santanachelys is typical of what is expected of an early sea turtle. The front appendages not being fully evolved into flippers is a sign of this. The presence of large foramen in the turtle's skull where salt glands were is an interesting evolutionary point. It is pointed out that this suggests that the evolutionary return to oceanic waters of the sea turtle line evolved before the finalization and streamlining of its paddles.

Taxonomically, Santanachelys has been placed in the family Protostegidae along with many other extinct sea turtles. It is the earliest member of the family to date, and the earliest known member of the sea turtle superfamily, Chelonioidea. Cladistically, it is the sister taxon to the rest of the later protostegids, including Protostega and Notochelone. As a member of its family, its closest living relative belongs to the family Dermochelyidae, the leatherback turtle.

Its genus, Santanachelys was named for the Santana Formation, the locality where the fossil was found and chelys, Greek for "turtle". The species name, S. gaffneyi was named in honor of Eugene S. Gaffney, a paleontologist who specialized in turtle phylogeny.

== Fossils ==
As of 2023, two fossils of the species had been identified. The holotype specimen was described in 1998, and was deposited in the Teikyo Heisei University fossil collections in Japan. Beginning in 2012, the Brazilian government has unsuccessfully attempted to repatriate the fossil, but as of 2023 it remains at Waseda University.

After being part of the University of Zurich Department of Palaeontology for over 30 years and labeled simply as "Testudines indet.", the second fossil was described in 2023. The fossil had been altered and illegally sold by fossil dealers, in contravention of Brazilian law. Using CT scans, it was revealed that the bottom half of the specimen was a chimera created from parts of a Araripemys turtle fossil in combination with indeterminate fragments of shell. In 2023, the fossil was described and repatriated, being deposited at Federal Rural University of Pernambuco, in Brazil.
