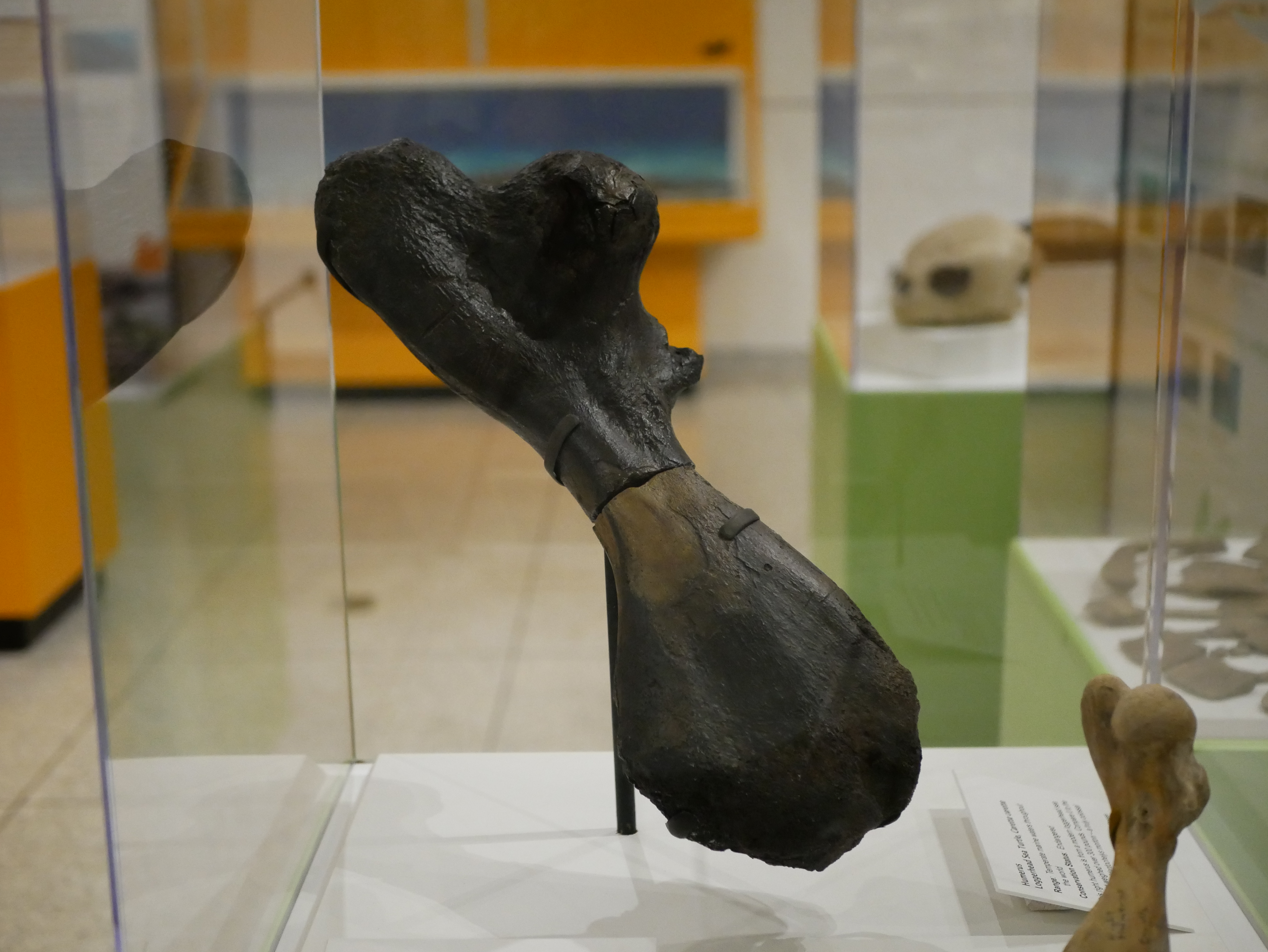
- Fossil humerus

Scientific classification
- Kingdom: Animalia
- Phylum: Chordata
- Class: Reptilia
- Order: Testudines
- Suborder: Cryptodira
- Family: †Protostegidae
- Genus: †Atlantochelys; Agassiz, 1849
- Species: †A. mortoni

Binomial name
- †Atlantochelys mortoni Agassiz, 1849

= Atlantochelys =

Atlantochelys Temporal range: Late Cretaceous, 83 Ma

Extinct genus of turtles

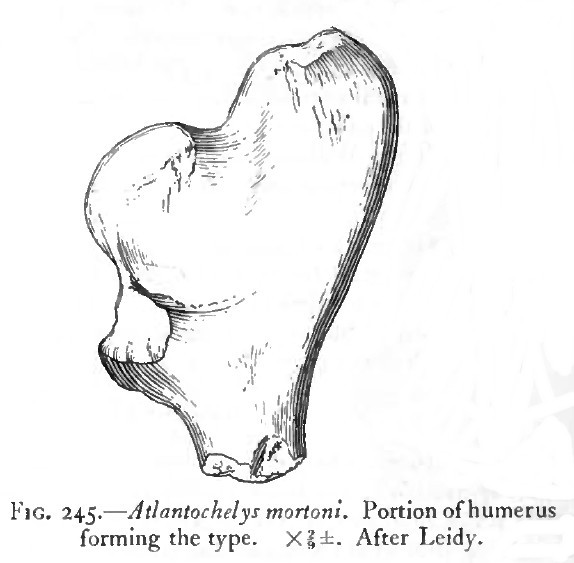
Illustration of the holotype.

Atlantochelys is an extinct genus of sea turtle from the Upper Cretaceous of New Jersey. For 163 years, only a partial humerus was known, but the second part of the same bone was found in 2012. The full size has been extrapolated as being 3 m (9.8 ft).
