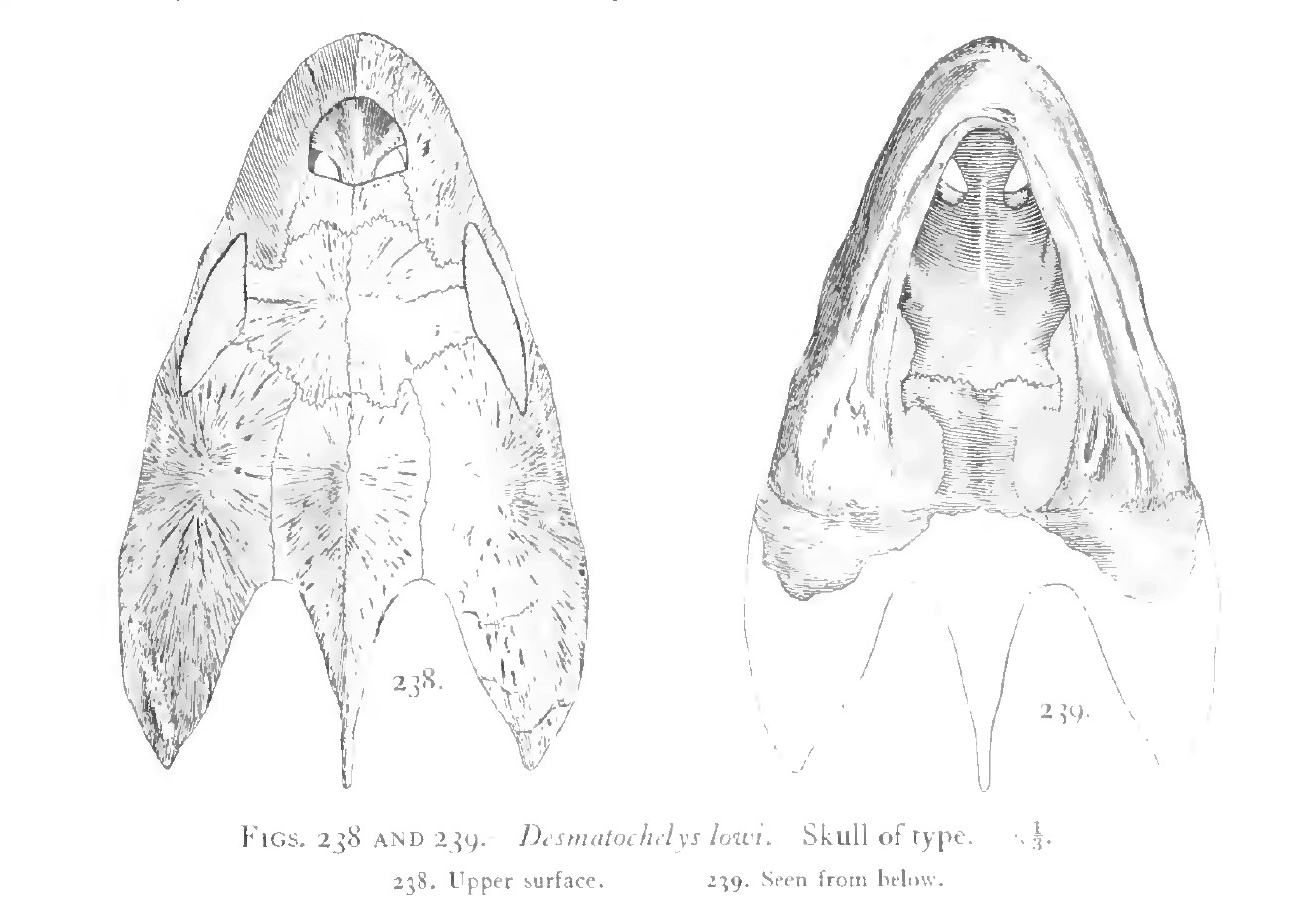
- Holotype skull of Desmatochelys lowi from two angles

Scientific classification
- Kingdom: Animalia
- Phylum: Chordata
- Class: Reptilia
- Order: Testudines
- Suborder: Cryptodira
- Family: †Protostegidae
- Genus: †Desmatochelys; Williston, 1894

Type species
- †Desmatochelys lowi Williston, 1894

Other species
- †D. padillai Cadena and Parham, 2015

= Desmatochelys =

Desmatochelys Temporal range: Cretaceous, 120–83.5 Ma

Extinct genus of turtles

Desmatochelys (from Greek δεσμός desmos 'link' + χέλῡς khelus 'tortoise') is an extinct genus of sea turtles belonging to the family Protostegidae. This genus contains two known species, D. lowii and D. padillai. D. lowii was first discovered in 1895, followed by D. padillai in 2015. Having been estimated at over 120 million years old, D. padillai is currently the oldest known species of sea turtle.

Desmatochelys lived during the Cretaceous, and had a wide geographic range, primarily along the Western Interior Seaway.

== Taxonomy ==
The genus contains two species:

- Desmatochelys lowi
- Desmatochelys padillai

Initially, Desmatochelys formed its own family, Desmatochelydae. Later it was reassigned into the family Protostegidae. There is some debate among the paleontological community over the placement of Protostegidae (and therefore Desmatochelys) within turtle phylogeny. According to Elizabeth L. Nicholls, the genus should also be expanded to include closely related members that currently belong to Notochelone and Rhinochelys. As of 2019, Desmatochelys contains the two previously stated species, is within the family Protostegidae, and is placed along the stem of Chelonioidea - in other words, it is considered a basal turtle genus.

== Discovery ==
=== D. lowii ===
The first specimen of Desmatochelys was described by Samuel Wendell Williston in the Kansas University Quarterly in 1894. In his article he describes its discovery by a railroad worker near Fairbury, Nebraska. Williston was granted access to the specimen by his colleague M. A. Low, giving rise to the name 'lowii'. This specimen was from the Late Cretaceous Benton Formation and included a nearly complete skull and lower jaw as well as pieces of the limbs, carapace, and plastron. Since first being discovered, at least five new specimens of D. lowii have been described, found in South Dakota, Kansas, Arizona, Canada, and Mexico. Specimen assigned to D. cf. lowii is also described from Yezo Group, Hokkaido, Japan.

=== D. padillai ===
The fossils of the now known as Desmatochelys padillai were discovered in the 1940s in Colombia. The first systematic study was done by Donald Thomas Jeremy Smith at Kingston Polytechnic, Surrey, England. In a part of his doctoral dissertation in 1989, he suggested the specimen should be classified under the genus Desmatochelys. Elizabeth L. Nicholls confirmed this classification in 1992. Due to its incomplete features and lack of information on the geological setting, the species remained undescribed at the museum of University of California, Berkeley. James Parham, who is one of the taxonomic authorities of the species, had seen the original fossils at Berkeley while still a PhD candidate in 1996. He recalled, "If I had known how old the specimens at Berkeley were in 1996, I would have included them in my dissertation, for sure." Better specimens were discovered in 2007 by hobby palaeontologists, Mary Luz Parra and her brothers Juan and Freddy Parra. The specimens were recovered from Villa de Leyva in Colombia. The location is within Paja Formation, which is already dated to belong to Lower Cretaceous, i.e., more than 120 million years old. The fossils were preserved in the collections of the Centro de Investigaciones Paleontológicas in Villa Leyva and the University of California Museum of Paleontology. Formal description was done by Edwin Cadena at the Senckenerg Research Institute, and James Parham at the California State University. It was discovered in Colombia with the Lower Cretaceous Paja Formation. This placed its age around 120 million years, making it the oldest known sea turtle, a title which was previously held by Santanachelys gaffneyi. The specific name was given in honour of Carlos Bernardo Padilla, a renowned supporter of the palaeontology of the region.

== Description ==
Desmatochelys was a large sea turtle, with some specimens reaching up to 2 meters long. Members of the genus are characterized by the extended skull roof, large nasal bones, and a paddle-like humerus, as well as a distinct body shell or carapace and reduced plastron like other protostegids.

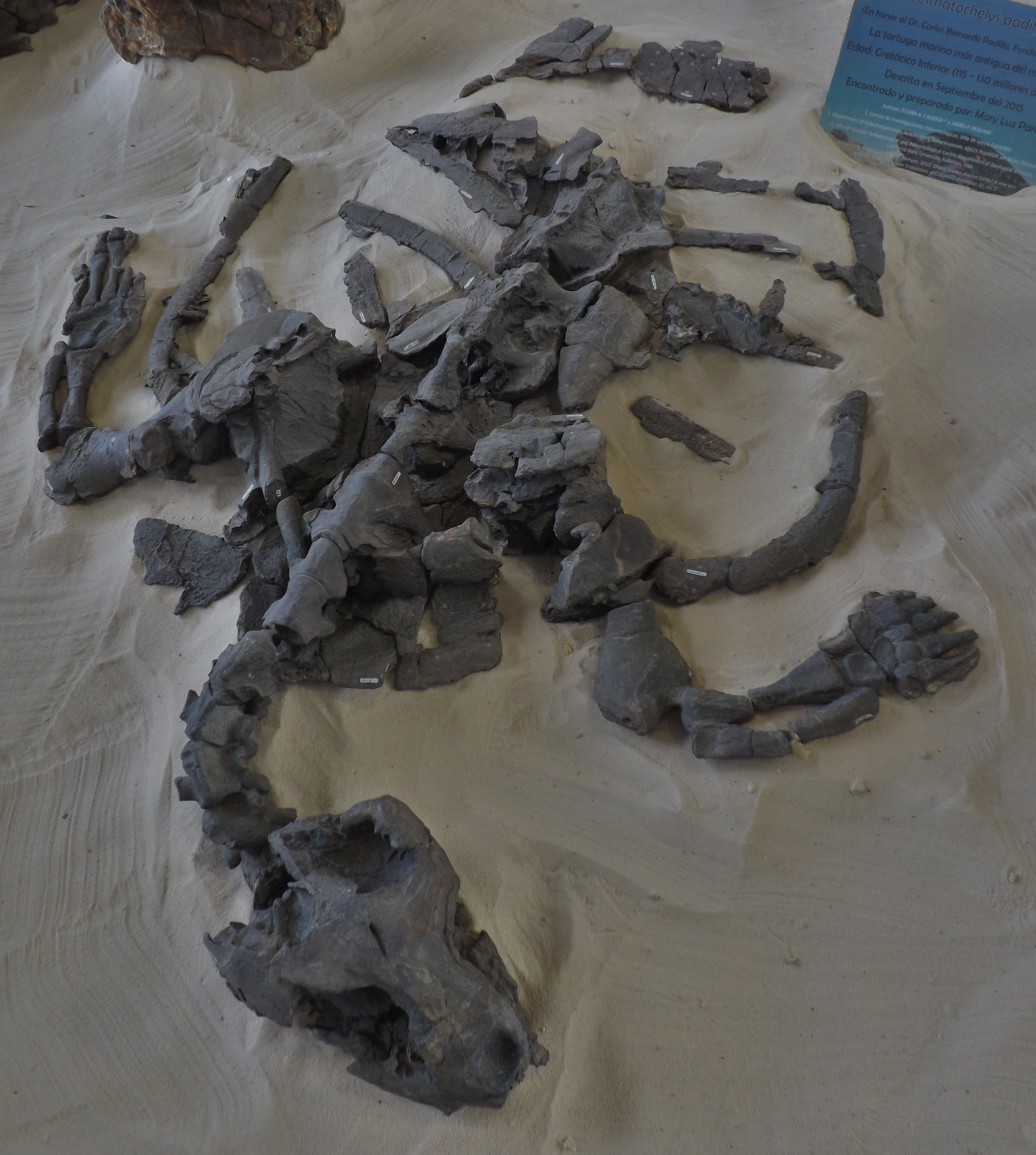
A large fossil skeleton of Desmatochelys padillai is presented on a bed of sand

Specimens of Desmatochelys have been found in Nebraska, South Dakota, Kansas, Arizona, Canada, Colombia, and Mexico. They are known to have existed along the Western Interior Seaway during the Late Cretaceous, and their range may have extended to the Pacific coast. Desmatochelys, like modern sea turtles, had a wide geographic distribution within the oceans.

As for its stratigraphic distribution, it is generally accepted that Desmatochelys was restricted to the Cretaceous, with occurrences ranging from the Barremian to the Campanian.

Nothing is known of this turtle's reproductive strategy, with the exception of their egg development. Desmatochelys is hypothesized to have laid rigid eggs instead of the soft-shelled eggs typical of extant marine turtles, as a closely related protostegid has been shown to do.

The fossils discovered in 2007 represent an almost complete skeleton. There are four skulls, two are complete and the others are nearly complete. The holotype consists of lower jaw, partial right hyoid, cervical vertebrae (3–8), right and left forelimbs (missing most phalanges), nearly complete carapace, left scapula and coracoid, partial hyoplastron and hypoplastron. The two partial shells are badly preserved but are distinct from those of other marine turtles.
