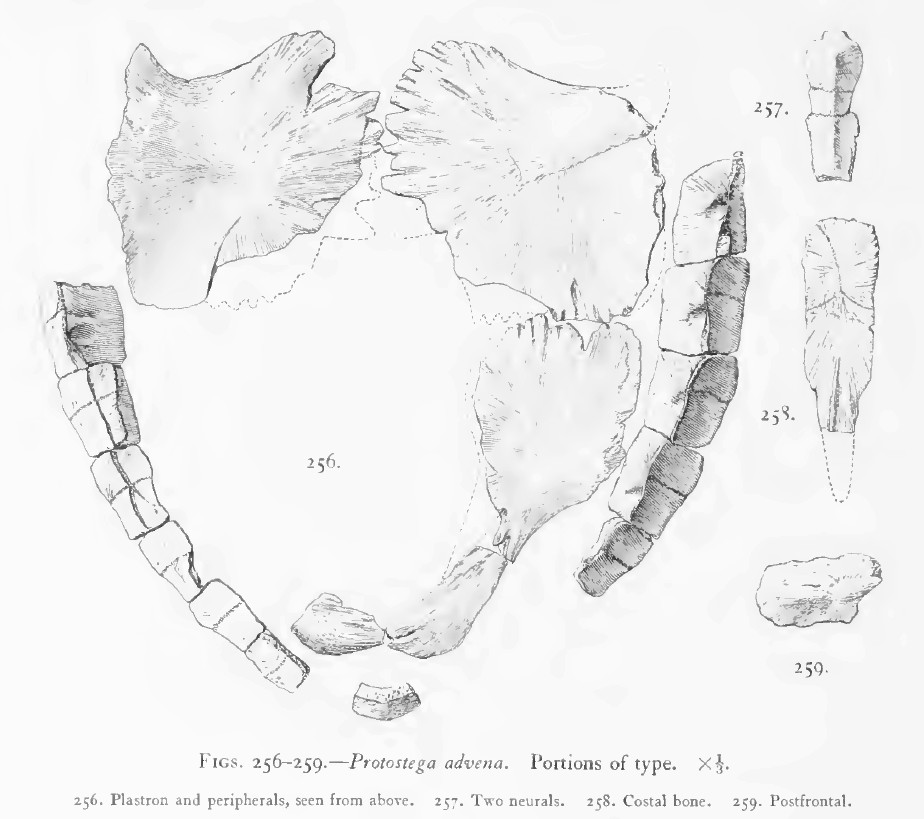

Scientific classification
- Domain: Eukaryota
- Kingdom: Animalia
- Phylum: Chordata
- Class: Reptilia
- Order: Testudines
- Suborder: Cryptodira
- Family: †Protostegidae
- Genus: †Chelosphargis; Zangerl, 1953

Type species
- †Protostega advena (Hay, 1908)

Species
- †Chelosphargis advena (Hay, 1908)

Synonyms
- Protostega advena Hay, 1908

= Chelosphargis =

Chelosphargis Temporal range: Late Cretaceous, 83 Ma

Extinct genus of turtles

Chelosphargis is an extinct genus of sea turtle from Upper Cretaceous of Alabama. Only one species has been described, Chelosphargis advena.
