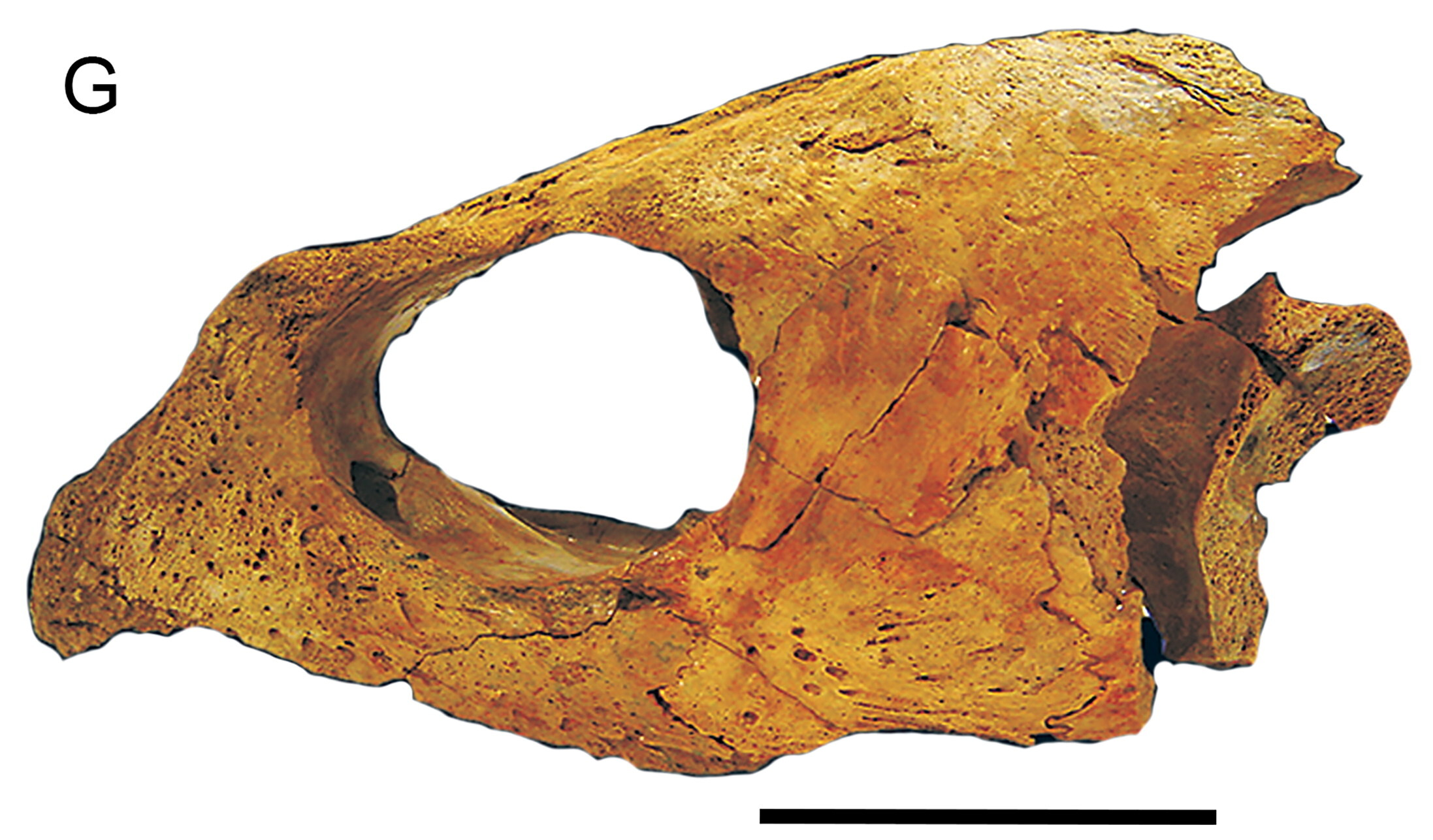
- Skull

Scientific classification
- Kingdom: Animalia
- Phylum: Chordata
- Class: Reptilia
- Order: Testudines
- Suborder: Cryptodira
- Family: †Protostegidae
- Genus: †Bouliachelys; Kear and Lee, 2006

Species
- B. suteri

= Bouliachelys =

Bouliachelys Temporal range: Cretaceous 105.3–99.7 Ma

Extinct genus of turtles

Bouliachelys is an extinct genus of sea turtle from Cretaceous Australia. It was originally described as a member of Protostegidae. In 2013 study it was considered to be a member of Dermochelyoidae, although later studies consider it as a protostegid again.
