= Courier Forschungsinstitut Senckenberg =

- Discipline: Paleontology
- Language: German, English

Publication details
- History: 1973–2008
- Publisher: Senckenberg Nature Research Society
- Frequency: Biweekly

Standard abbreviations
- ISO 4: Cour. Forschungsinst. Senckenberg

Indexing
- ISSN: 0341-4116

Links
- Journal homepage; Back issues

Courier Forschungsinstitut Senckenberg (Senckenberg Research Institute Courier) was a multilingual (German and English) scientific journal focusing on geology and paleontology. The Senckenberg Nature Research Society published 260 volumes from 1973 to 2008.
