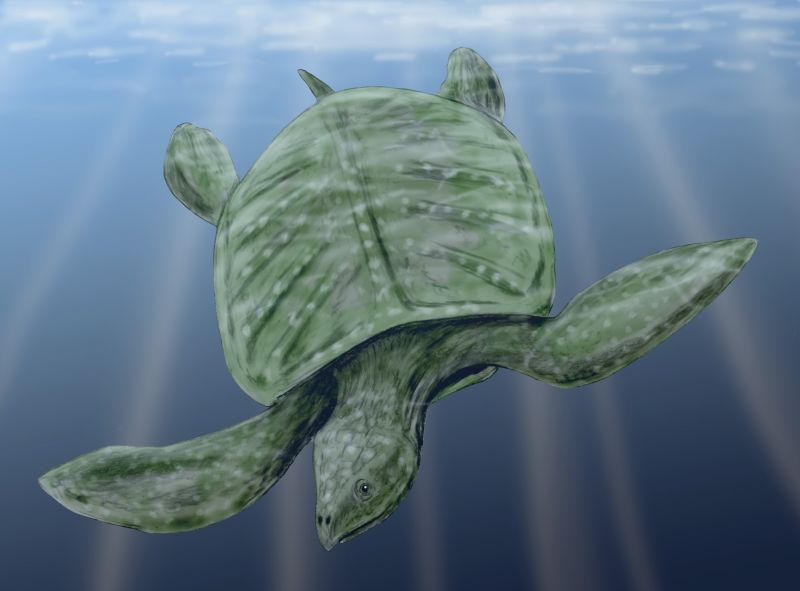
- Life restoration of Archelon ischyros

Scientific classification
- Kingdom: Animalia
- Phylum: Chordata
- Class: Reptilia
- Order: Testudines
- Suborder: Cryptodira
- Clade: Panchelonioidea (?)
- Family: †Protostegidae; Cope, 1873

Type species
- †Protostega gigas Cope, 1872

Genera
- †Alienochelys; †Archelon; †Atlantochelys; †Bouliachelys; †Calcarichelys; †Chelosphargis; †Cratochelone; †Desmatochelys; †Iserosaurus; †Kansastega; †Notochelone; †Ocepechelon; †Pneumatoarthrus; †Protostega; †Rhinochelys; †Santanachelys; †Teguliscapha; †Terlinguachelys

= Protostegidae =

Protostegids Temporal range: Cretaceous, Valanginian–Maastrichtian

Extinct family of turtles

Protostegidae is a family of extinct marine turtles that lived during the Cretaceous period. The family includes some of the largest sea turtles that ever existed. The largest Archelon had a head one metre (39 in) long. Like most sea turtles, they had flattened bodies and flippers for front appendages; protostegids had minimal shells like leatherback turtles of modern times.

== Anatomy ==
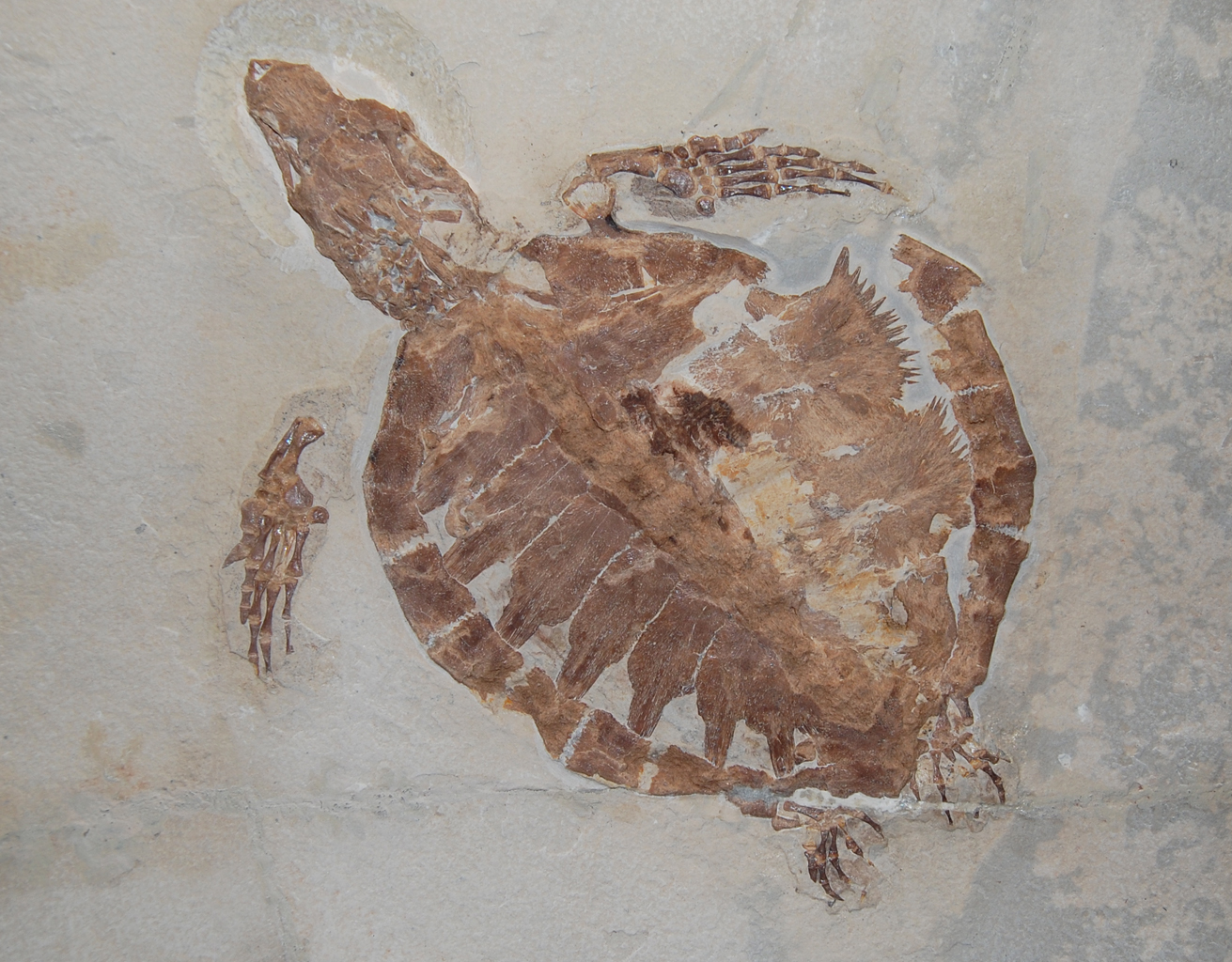
Fossil of Rhinochelys nammourensis from Lebanon

As some of the first marine turtles, the protostegids set the general body plan for future species of sea turtles. They had a generally depressed turtle body plan, complete with four limbs, a short tail, and a large head at the end of a relatively short neck. Like other sea turtles, they possessed oar-like front appendages especially evolved for swimming in the open ocean. Similar to the still-extant, possibly closely related Dermochelyidae, protostegids possessed extremely reduced carapaces. Some specimens had skeletal protrusions from their ribs almost wrapping around their bodies in place of a complete shell. Like modern sea turtles, protostegids had sharp beaks. One of the defining characteristics of the members of the family was their almost-disproportionately large heads. Specifically, some specimens of Archelon have been found with heads one metre (39 in) long. In addition, the members of the family had somewhat reduced plastrons, as well.

== Ecology ==
=== Trophic ecology ===
While all members of the family are extinct, palaeoecological studies on the members of the family have provided some insight into the ecological roles of the Protostegidae. Analysis of fossil organs of some protostegids has revealed entire stomachs containing fossilized shells of inoceramids clams, and the first evidence of gastroliths was reported in 2024. The turtles, in turn, are postulated to have been preyed upon by the major predators of the time. Fossil protostegids have been found with tooth impressions from the large lamnid sharks of the time. Two specimens of Protostega gigas have been discovered to have tooth marks from large sharks. In addition, teeth of the extinct shark Cretoxyrhina mantelli have been found embedded in at least one Protostega skeleton.

== Evolutionary history ==
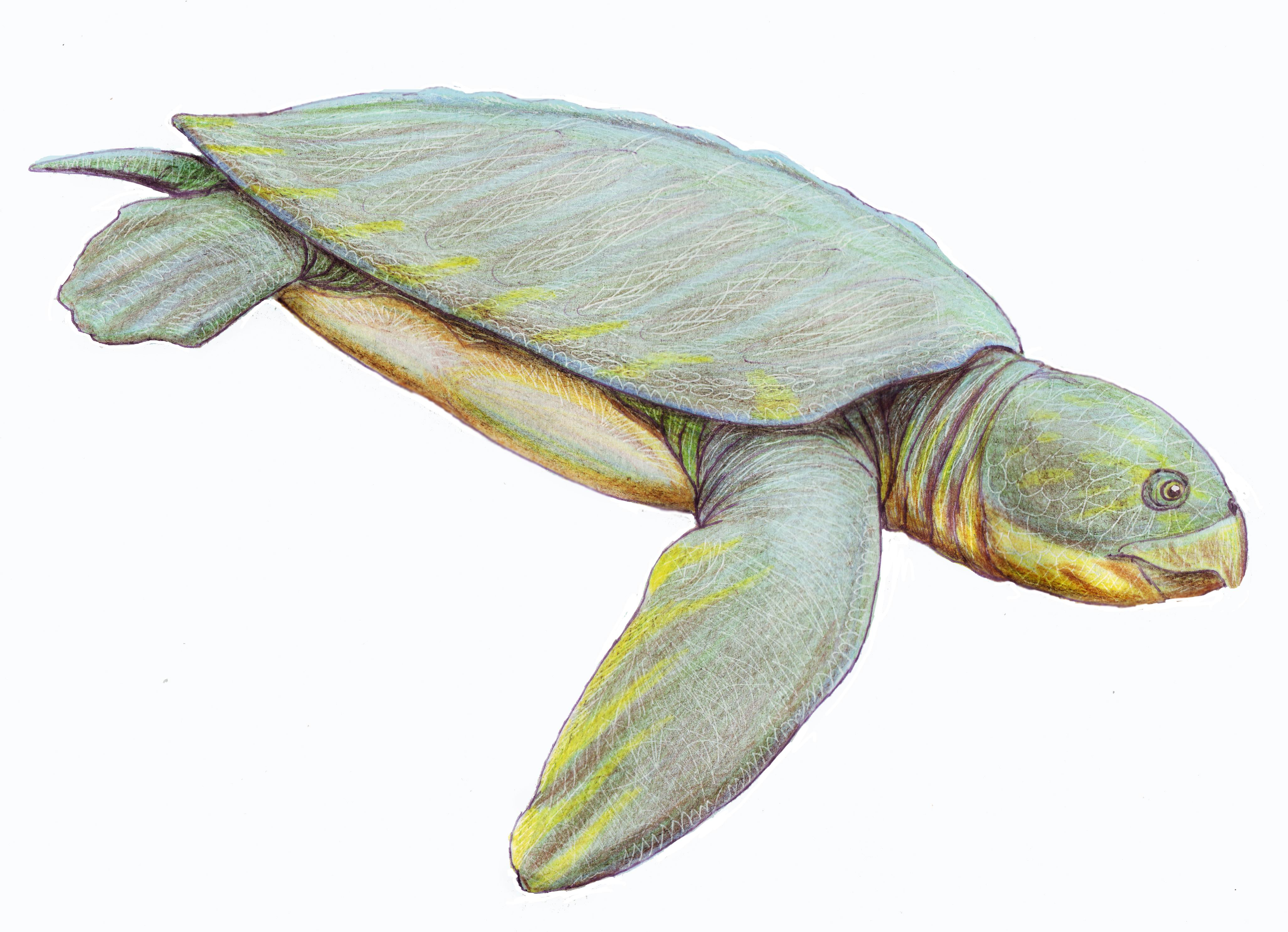
Life restoration of Protostega gigas

The family's oldest members include an Early Cretaceous (Valanginian) taxon described on the basis of limb bones and shell remains from the Rosablanca Formation of Colombia, Desmatochelys padillai, known from the specimens recovered from the Early Cretaceous Paja Formation of Colombia and Santanachelys gaffneyi, known from a specimen excavated from Brazil in 1998. The latter species first appeared during the Early Cretaceous. As an early sea turtle, Santanachelys had several unspecialized characteristics, such as distinguishable digits in its flipper-like arms. Later relatives' flippers were completely fused together for more efficient swimming. As with most large fauna of the era, the Protostegidae died out during the events of the Cretaceous–Paleogene extinction event that led to the extinction of the dinosaurs.

The exact phylogenetic position of protostegids among turtles is uncertain. Some phylogenetic studies determine the leatherback turtles in the family Dermochelyidae to be their closest living relatives, with both these families being monophyletic. Conversely, the phylogenetic analyses conducted by Joyce (2007) and Anquetin (2012), which included one protostegid species (Santanachelys gaffneyi), recovered the family as only distantly related to leatherback turtles. Joyce (2007) recovered Protostegidae as basal eucryptodiran turtles lying outside the crown group of Cryptodira (the least inclusive clade containing all living cryptodirans) and closely related to Solnhofia parsonsi; Santanachelys had a similar phylogenetic position in the analysis conducted by Anquetin (2012), who stressed that future studies should include more protostegids to confirm this phylogenetic placement. If confirmed, these results would prove that protostegids weren't close relatives of leatherback turtles (or in fact any living cryptodirans), but instead "represent an independent lineage of marine turtles that originated in the Late Jurassic". The analyses conducted by Sterli (2010) and Sterli & de la Fuente (2011) recovered Santanachelys (and, presumably, the entirety of Protostegidae) as even more distantly related to living cryptodirans; it was found to be basal turtle lying outside the crown group of turtles (the least inclusive clade containing cryptodirans and pleurodirans).

A phylogenetic analysis conducted by Cadena and Parham (2015) recovered Protostegidae within the crown group of Cryptodira; specifically the family was recovered as belonging to Chelonioidea and more closely related to the leatherback sea turtle than cheloniids are.

== Taxonomic history ==
In 1888, the Belgian zoologist George Albert Boulenger published his classification of the Testudinata within the 9th edition of the Encyclopædia Britannica. The genus Protostega was placed within the family Sphargidae under the suborder Athecae, and the family Protostegidae was named by Edward Drinker Cope in 1873. A year or so later, the entire suborder was downgraded by Karl Alfred von Zittel into a family within the Cryptodira.

In 1994, Hirayama proposed a three-family subdivision of the sea turtle superfamily based on cladistic analysis; Protostegidae was given full, formal family status in the system, containing most of the extinct genera, including Archelon, and a previously undescribed protostegid. The unidentified specimen was fully described in 1998, as the species Santanachelys gaffneyi. The genus Santanachelys was appended to the family after the new species was described. This specimen was later to be analyzed to be the family's oldest member.
