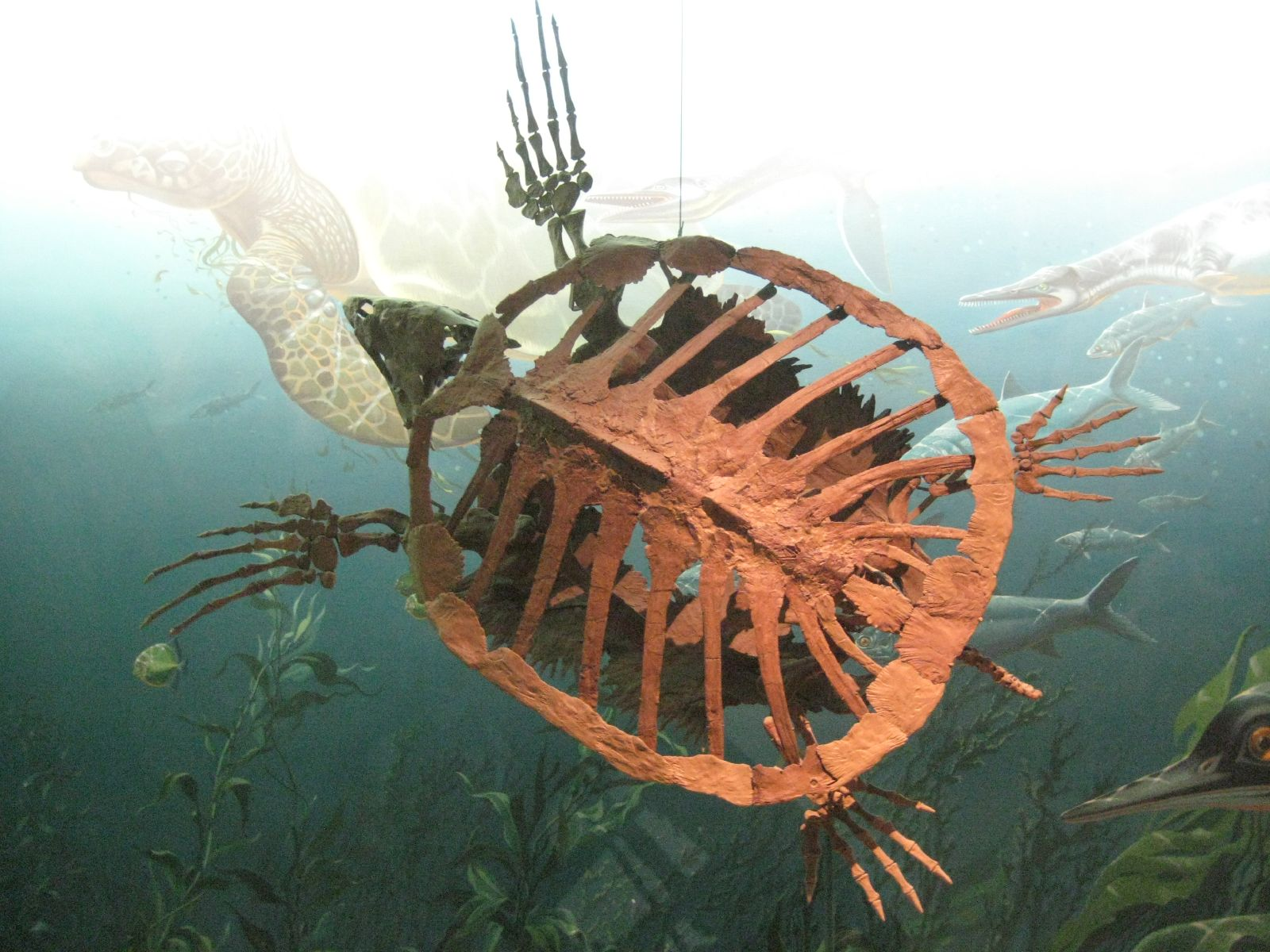
- Mounted skeleton

Scientific classification
- Kingdom: Animalia
- Phylum: Chordata
- Class: Reptilia
- Order: Testudines
- Suborder: Cryptodira
- Family: †Protostegidae
- Genus: †Protostega; Cope, 1872

Type species
- †Protostega gigas Cope, 1872

= Protostega =

Protostega Temporal range: Late Cretaceous, 89.8–80 Ma

Genus of reptiles

Protostega ('first roof') is an extinct genus of sea turtle containing a single species, Protostega gigas. The species lasted from the Coniacian to the Campanian stages of the Late Cretaceous. Its fossil remains have been found in the Smoky Hill Chalk formation of western Kansas (Hesperornis zone, dated to 83.5 million years ago), time-equivalent beds of the Mooreville Chalk Formation of Alabama and Campanian beds of the Rybushka Formation (Saratov Oblast, Russia). It is also known from the middle Campanian Pembina member of the Pierre shale in Canada, Fossil specimens of this species were first collected in 1871, and named by Edward Drinker Cope in 1872. With a total length of 3.9 metres (13 ft), it is the second-largest sea turtle that ever lived, second only to the giant Archelon, and one of the three largest turtles of all time alongside Archelon and Gigantatypus.

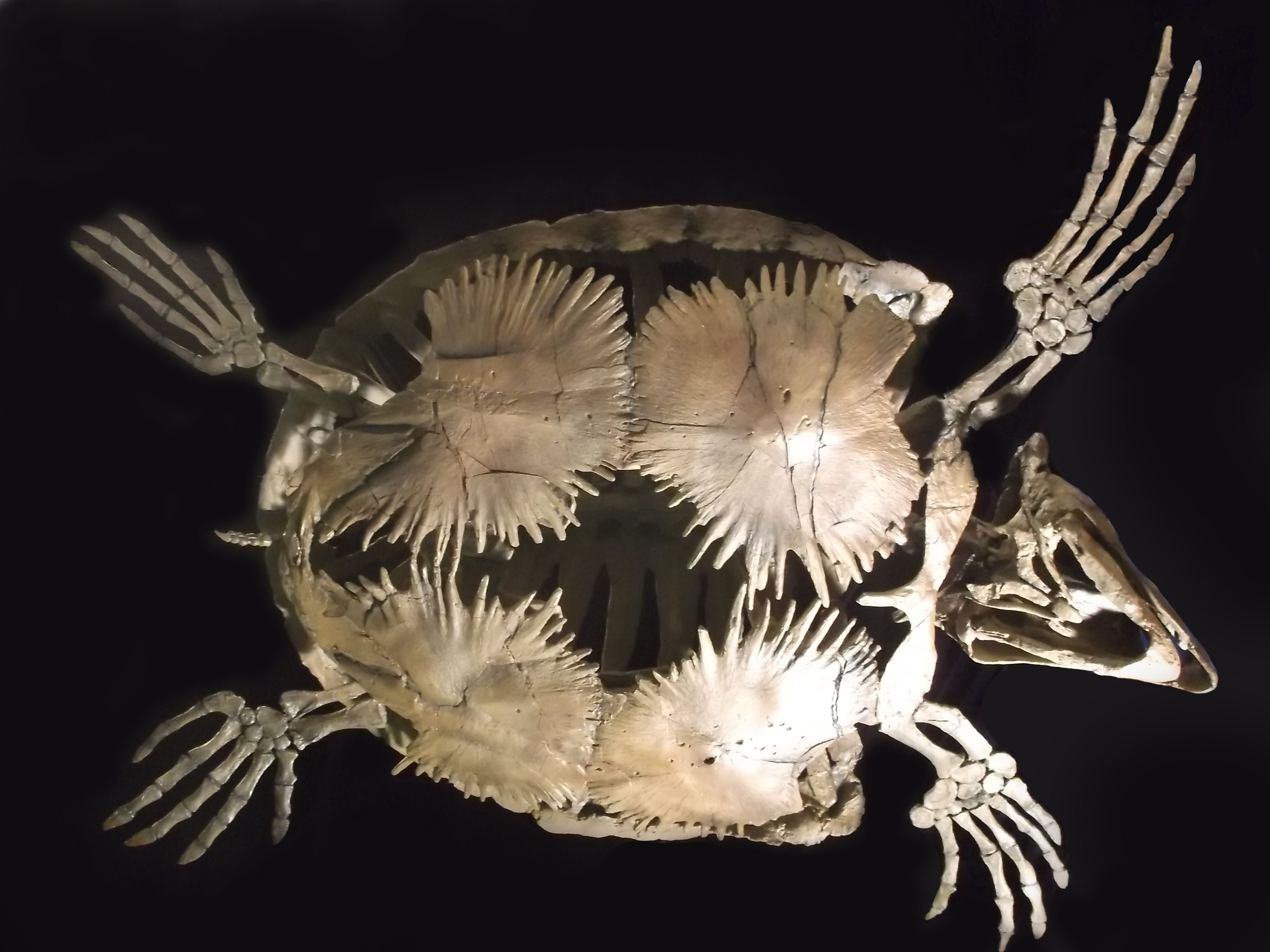
Protostega skeletal reconstruction in the Rocky Mountain Dinosaur Resource Center, Woodland Park, Colorado

== Discovery and history ==
The first known Protostega specimen (YPM 1408) was collected on July 4 by the 1871 Yale College Scientific Expedition, close to Fort Wallace and about 5 months before Cope arrived in Kansas. However, the fossil that they found was never described or named. It was not named until 1872, when E. D. Cope found and collected the first identified specimen of Protostega gigas in the Kansas chalk in 1871 based off of a variety of bones found in yellow Cretaceous chalk from a bluff near Butte Creek.

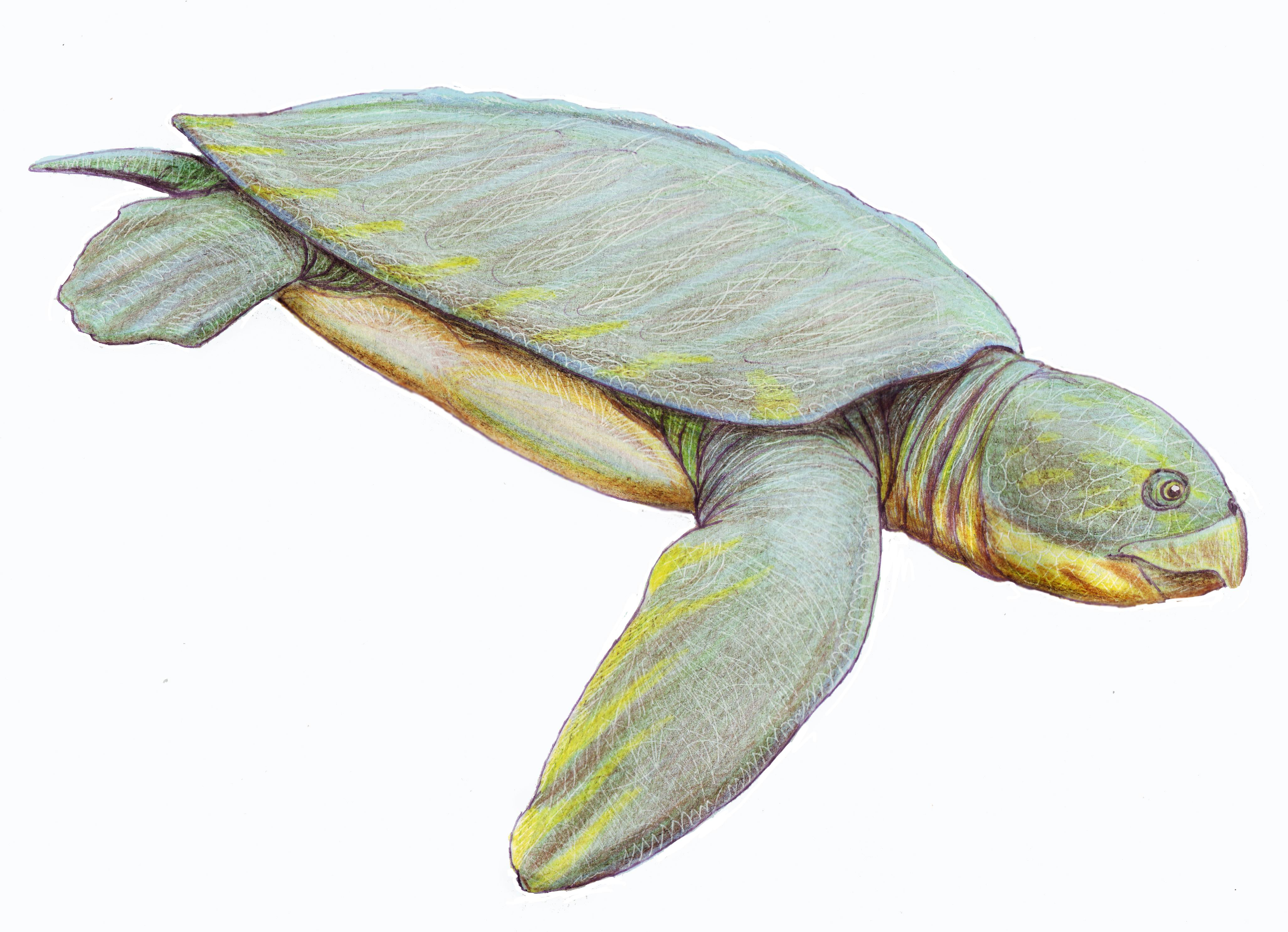
Life restoration

== Description ==
Protostega is known to have reached up to 3–3.9 m (9.8–12.8 ft) in length. A specimen from the upper Taylor Marl is even larger, at 2 m (6.6 ft) in carapace length and 4.2 m (14 ft) in total length. Despite lacking its head and three limbs, it is well-preserved.

The shell of Protostega gigas had a reduced degree of ossification compared to most turtles, which may have helped with weight reduction. The carapace is greatly reduced, forming a disk which extends less than halfway towards the distal ends of the ribs. Other modifications include an extremely long coracoid process that reached all the way to the pelvis and a humerus that resembled that of Dermochelys, which may have aided in movement of the forelimb.

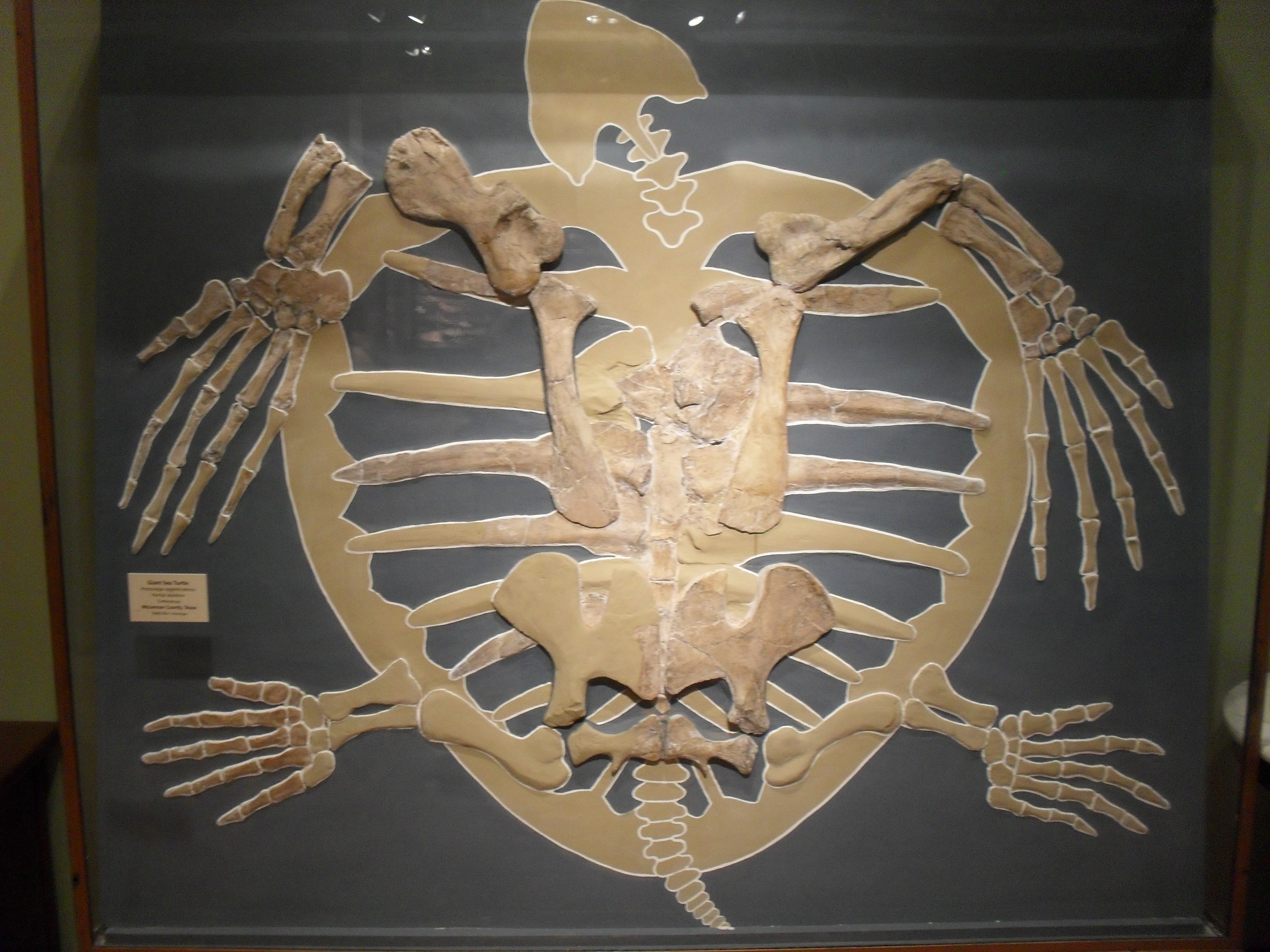
Body structure of fossilized Protostega

Protostega gigas had a large jugal that reached to the quadrate, as well as a thickened pterygoid that reached to the mandibular articulating surface of the quadrate. The posterior portion of the vomer is reduced where the palatines meet medially. The premaxillary beak was much shorter than that of Archelon, lacking a pronounced hook; a large crushing surface is present in the jaws. In front of the orbital region the skull is elongated with a broadly-roofed temporal region. The quadratojugal was triangular with a concave posterior edge, with the entire bone being convex from distal view. The squamosal is concave on the surface at the upper end of the quadrate. In Cope's fossil the mandible was preserved almost perfectly, and he noted that the jaw was very similar to the Cheloniidae and the dentary was broad with a concave surface, and deeply pitted.

== Classification ==
The type specimen described by Cope from Kansas was poorly preserved, making classification difficult. Cope noted similarities with the genus Dermochelys and the family Cheloniidae, but noted differences from those groups; namely, a reduced or lacking amount of dermal ossification on the back, the articulation of the pterygoid and quadrates, the presence of a presplenial bone in the jaw, a lack of an articular process on the back side of the nuchal, simple formation of the radial process on the humerus, and a peculiar bent formation of the xiphiplastra. He concluded that Protostega gigas was an intermediate form between Dermochelys and Cheloniidae.

As of 2021, the genus is classified in the clade Protostegidae, along with other Late Cretaceous sea turtles. The clade is thought to be closely related to or nested within the modern chelonioidea, and may be related to the Early Cretaceous sea turtle clade Thalassochelydia.

== Paleobiology ==
Fossils of Protostega have been found in the central part of North America, in a region that was once the Western Interior Seaway. This epicontinental seaway covered the central part of North America during the Late Cretaceous and connected to the Boreal and Tethyan oceans.

Examining the bone tissue microstructure (osteohistology) of Protostega has revealed growth patterns similar to modern leatherback sea turtles with rapid growth to large body size. Leatherbacks are not strictly ectotherms like other modern non-avian reptiles, instead having high resting metabolic rates and the ability to hold a body temperature higher than their surroundings. As Protostega had similar bone growth patterns to leatherbacks, it is hypothesized that the genus had a similarly high metabolic rate. This rapid attainment of adult body size may also indicate a rapid attainment of reproductive maturity, which would have been a great advantage in their survival. However, comparing Protostega to its more basal relative Desmatochelys shows that not all protostegids had the same growth patterns. This indicates that rapid growth to large size evolved late within the lineage, perhaps in response to the evolution of large mosasaurs like Tylosaurus. Given uncertainties in the phylogenetic placement of protostegids relative to living sea turtles, it is unclear if the evolution of rapid growth rates and possible elevated metabolism in Protostega and modern leatherbacks evolved convergently or if it instead reflects a shared ancestral condition.

Cope concluded that Protostega was most likely omnivorous and consumed a diet of hard shelled crustacean creatures, due to the long symphysis of its lower jaw. Protostega also likely fed on seaweed and jellyfish or scavenged on floating carcasses as well, like modern turtles.

== See also ==
- List of Turtles
- Western Interior Seaway
- Late Cretaceous
