= 2019 in reptile paleontology =

This list of fossil reptiles described in 2019 is a list of new taxa of fossil reptiles that were described during the year 2019, as well as other significant discoveries and events related to reptile paleontology that occurred in 2019.

== Lizards and snakes ==
=== Research ===
- A study aiming to test which ecological and developmental traits have influenced skull evolution in the squamate reptiles, based on data from extant and extinct taxa, is published by Watanabe et al. (2019).
- A new assemblage of lizard tracks, representing the largest such assemblage yet reported from the Cretaceous, is described from the Lower Cretaceous Jinju Formation (South Korea) by Kim et al. (2019), who name a new ichnotaxon Neosauroides innovatus.
- New specimen of Yabeinosaurus robustus, preserving traces of integument and abdominal contents, is described by Xing et al. (2019).
- Jaw elements of skinks with an anatomy identical to Heremites vittatus are described from the late Miocene locality Solnechnodolsk (Russia) by Čerňanský & Syromyatnikova (2019), representing first Neogene record of the clade Mabuyidae reported so far.
- A juvenile specimen of Eolacerta robusta is described from the Eocene Messel pit (Germany) by Čerňanský & Smith (2019).
- Description of late Miocene lacertid fossils from the Solnechnodolsk locality (Russia), belonging to a relative of extant Balkan green lizard, is published by Čerňanský & Syromyatnikova (2019).
- A study on the diet, habitat and timing and cause of extinction of Gallotia goliath is published by Crowley et al. (2019).
- An almost complete and articulated fossil skull of the La Palma giant lizard is described from the Pleistocene of the La Palma island (Canary Islands) by Cruzado-Caballero et al. (2019), who also study the phylogenetic relationships of extant and fossil members of the genus Gallotia.
- The first fossil of a fringe-toed lizard reported so far is described from the Miocene Dove Spring Formation (California, United States) by Scarpetta (2019).
- A study on the taxonomy and evolutionary history of glyptosaurine anguids is published by Sullivan (2019).
- Fossils of Peltosaurus granulosus are described from the middle Oligocene Monroe Creek and upper Sharps formations of Sharps Corner, South Dakota by Scarpetta (2019), representing the youngest known record of glyptosaurine lizards reported so far.
- Fossil anguine material is described from the lower Miocene locality Ulm – Westtangente (Germany) for the first time by Klembara, Hain & Čerňanský (2019).
- Bochaton et al. (2019) present equations producing estimations of size and weight of monitor lizards on the basis of measurements of their bones, and use them to determine body size and weight of Late Pleistocene monitor lizards known from remains from the Doi Pha Kan rock shelter (Thailand).
- A study evaluating the fossil record of mosasaurs in terms of fossil completeness as a measure of fossil quality is published by Driscoll et al. (2019).
- A study on the morphology of the marginal teeth of Mosasaurus lemonnieri, and on their implications for the distinguishability of this species on the basis of fossil teeth, is published online by Madzia (2019).
- A skull of a member of the genus Mosasaurus is reported from the upper Maastrichtian López de Bertodano Formation (Seymour Island, Antarctica) by Ruiz et al. (2019).
- A study on the anatomy of the inner ear of Platecarpus is published by Yi & Norell (2019).
- An isolated tooth of a tylosaurine mosasaur is described from the Turonian of the Apennine Carbonate Platform by Romano et al. (2019), representing the first tylosaurine from Italy and the southernmost occurrence of a tylosaurine in the northern margin of the Mediterranean Tethys.
- A study on the phylogenetic relationships of tylosaurine mosasaurs is published by Jiménez-Huidobro & Caldwell (2019).
- A review of the taxonomic history of Clidastes liodontus and "Clidastes moorevillensis" is published by Lively (2019).
- A juvenile mosasaur specimen affected by infectious arthritis and spondyloarthropathy is described from the upper Maastrichtian of Antarctica by Talevi et al. (2019), representing the first report of a skeletal pathology of a mosasaur from the Southern Hemisphere.
- A study on the spatial and temporal distribution and evolutionary history of dolichosaurs is published by Campbell Mekarski, Pierce & Caldwell (2019).
- A study on the evolution, homology and reduction of the pelvic elements and hindlimbs of snakes is published online by Palci et al. (2019).
- A study on the evolution of vertebral intercentrum system of snakes, as indicated by data from specimens of Najash rionegrina and Dinilysia patagonica, is published by Garberoglio et al. (2019).
- New specimen of Najash rionegrina, consisting of a partial skull and closely associated vertebrae, is described by Garberoglio et al. (2019).
- Description of new fossil material (including eight skulls) of Najash rionegrina, and a study on the implications of these fossils for the knowledge of the evolution of the snake body plan, is published by Garberoglio et al. (2019).
- A study on the vertebral microanatomy of extinct aquatic snakes belonging to the families Nigerophiidae, Palaeophiidae and Russelophiidae is published by Houssaye et al. (2019).
- A study on the phylogenetic relationship and evolutionary history of caenophidian snakes, as indicated by data from extant taxa and fossil record, is published by Zaher et al. (2019).
- Revision of dipsadid snake fossils from Guadeloupe Islands is published by Bochaton et al. (2019).
- Snake fauna from the Miocene of the Baikadam and Malyi Kalkaman 1 and 2 localities in northeastern Kazakhstan, representing the best-documented Miocene snake assemblage in Central Asia, is described by Ivanov et al. (2019).
- Description of fossil snake vertebrae from the late Pleistocene fissure deposits of the Minatogawa Man site (Okinawa Island, Japan) is published by Ikeda et al. (2019).
- Description of Pleistocene snake fossils from the Shanyangzhai Cave (Hebei, China) is published online by Chen et al. (2019).
- Description of fossil material of lizards from the Oligocene and Miocene of the Valley of the Lakes (central Mongolia) is published by Čerňanský & Augé (2019).

=== New taxa ===
| Name | Novelty | Status | Authors | Age | Type locality | Country | Notes | Images |
|---|---|---|---|---|---|---|---|---|
| Chalcides augei | Sp. nov | Valid | Čerňanský et al. | Early middle Miocene | | Russia | A skink, a species of Chalcides. Announced in 2019; the final version of the article naming it was published in 2020. | |
| Egernia gillespieae | Sp. nov | Valid | Thorn et al. | Middle Miocene | Riversleigh site | Australia | A skink, a species of Egernia. | |
| Eomadtsoia | Gen. et sp. nov | Valid | Gómez, Garberoglio & Rougier | Late Cretaceous (Maastrichtian) | La Colonia Formation | Argentina | A madtsoiid snake. Genus includes new species E. ragei. | |
| Globidens simplex | Sp. nov | Valid | Leblanc, Mohr & Caldwell | Late Cretaceous (Maastrichtian) | Possibly Oulad Abdoun Basin | Morocco | A mosasaur. | |
| Gurvelus | Gen. et sp. nov | Valid | Alifanov | Early Cretaceous (late Aptian–early Albian) | Hühteeg Horizon | Mongolia | A lizard belonging to the family Ardeosauridae. The type species is G. khangaicus. | |
| Hoeckosaurus | Gen. et sp. nov | Valid | Čerňanský | Early Oligocene | | Mongolia | Possibly a member of Dibamidae. Genus includes new species H. mongoliensis. | |
| Hongshanxi | Gen. et sp. nov | Valid | Dong et al. | Late Jurassic (Oxfordian) | Tiaojishan Formation | China | A lizard of uncertain phylogenetic placement. The type species is H. xiei. | |
| Indrasaurus | Gen. et sp. nov | Valid | O'Connor et al. | Early Cretaceous | Jiufotang Formation | China | A basal member of Scleroglossa. The type species is I. wangi. | |
| Khereidia | Gen. et sp. nov | Valid | Alifanov | Early Cretaceous (late Aptian–early Albian) | Hühteeg Horizon | Mongolia | A lizard belonging to the family Globauridae. The type species is K. aptiana. | |
| Lapparentophis ragei | Sp. nov | Valid | Vullo | Cretaceous (Albian–Cenomanian) | Kem Kem Beds | Morocco | An early snake. | |
| Naimanosaurus | Gen. et sp. nov | Valid | Alifanov | Early Cretaceous (late Aptian–early Albian) | Hühteeg Horizon | Mongolia | A lizard belonging to the family Paramacellodidae. The type species is N. dinosauroaequalis. | |
| Ophisaurus manchenioi | Sp. nov | Valid | Blain & Bailon | Early Pleistocene | | Spain | An anguid lizard, a species of Ophisaurus. | |
| Palaeopython helveticus | Sp. nov | Valid | Georgalis & Scheyer | Eocene | | Switzerland | A boid snake. | |
| Palaeoxanta | Gen. et sp. nov | Valid | Alifanov | Early Cretaceous (late Aptian–early Albian) | Hühteeg Horizon | Mongolia | A lizard belonging to the family Eoxantidae. The type species is P. conicodentata. | |
| Paradorsetisaurus | Gen. et sp. nov | Valid | Alifanov | Early Cretaceous | | Mongolia | A lizard belonging to the family Dorsetisauridae. Genus includes new species P. postumus. | |
| Paraxenophis | Gen. et sp. nov | Valid | Georgalis et al. | Latest Miocene or earliest Pliocene | | Greece | A colubrid snake. The type species is P. spanios. | |
| Periergophis | Gen. et sp. nov | Valid | Georgalis et al. | Latest Miocene or earliest Pliocene | | Greece | A colubrid snake. The type species is P. micros. | |
| Portunatasaurus | Gen. et sp. nov | Valid | Campbell Mekarski et al. | Late Cretaceous (Cenomanian–Turonian) | | Croatia | An aigialosaur mosasauroid. Genus includes new species P. krambergeri. | |
| Sardophis | Gen. et sp. nov | Valid | Georgalis & Delfino in Georgalis et al. | Early Pleistocene | | Italy | A snake, a member of Colubroidea of uncertain phylogenetic placement. The type species is S. elaphoides. | |
| Xenostius | Gen. et sp. nov | Valid | Alifanov | Early Cretaceous | | Mongolia | A lizard belonging to the family Xenosauridae. Genus includes new species X. futilus. | |

== Ichthyosauromorphs ==
=== Research ===
- Two new specimens of Eretmorhipis carrolldongi, revealing superficial convergence with the modern platypus, are described from the Lower Triassic Jialingjiang Formation (China) by Cheng et al. (2019).
- A study on the phylogenetic relationships of ichthyosaurs will be published by Moon (2019).
- A study on the evolution of ichthyosaur body forms and on its impact on the energy demands of ichthyosaur swimming is published by Gutarra et al. (2019).
- A study on the flexibility and function of ichthyosaur tails, as indicated by comparisons with shark tails, is published by Crofts, Shehata & Flammang (2019).
- A study on the effects of methodology, missing data and exceptional preservation of fossil specimens in lagerstätten on known morphological diversity of fossil animals, as indicated by fossil record of ichthyosaurs, is published by Flannery Sutherland et al. (2019).
- A study on a putative Cretaceous mosasaur "Globidens" timorensis from Timor is published by Mulder & Jagt (2019), who consider this taxon to be of Triassic age, and reinterpret it as an ichthyosaur with affinities to the genera Tholodus and Xinminosaurus.
- A study on the prevalence and distribution of pathologies in the skeletons of ichthyosaurs from the Lower Jurassic Posidonienschiefer Formation (Germany) by Pardo-Pérez, Kear & Maxwell (2019).
- Second specimen of Wahlisaurus massarae is reported from a quarry in Somerset (United Kingdom), from the base of the Blue Lias Formation (Triassic–Jurassic boundary) by Lomax, Evans & Carpenter (2019), extending known geographic and stratigraphic range of the species.
- Partial skeleton of a large ichthyosaur from the Lower Jurassic (Sinemurian) of Warwickshire, England is described by Lomax, Porro & Larkin (2019), who assign this specimen to the species Protoichthyosaurus prostaxalis.
- A study on the anatomy of the skull roof of Protoichthyosaurus prostaxalis, incorporating data from a previously unrecognized specimen, is published online by Lomax, Massare & Evans (2019).
- A neonate specimen of Ichthyosaurus communis is described by Lomax et al. (2019).
- A study on the variation of the hindfin morphology in the specimens of Ichthyosaurus and on its taxonomic utility is published by Massare & Lomax (2019).
- A study on the bone microstructure of the skeleton of a specimen of Stenopterygius quadriscissus from the Lower Jurassic Posidonia Shale (Germany) is published by Anderson et al. (2019).
- A study on the ontogenetic variation in the anatomy of the braincases of members of the genus Stenopterygius is published by Miedema & Maxwell (2019).
- Description of new ophthalmosaurid fossils from the Upper Jurassic of the Slottsmøya Member Lagerstätte (Spitsbergen, Norway) and a study on the phylogenetic relationships of ophthalmosaurid specimens from the Slottsmøya Member Lagerstätte is published by Delsett et al. (2019).
- A revision of the type series of all three species of Undorosaurus is published by Zverkov & Efimov (2019).
- A study on the taxonomy and phylogeny of ichthyosaurs belonging to the genus Arthropterygius is published by Zverkov & Prilepskaya (2019).
- New fossil remains of Platypterygius sachicarum (a new skull and associated postcranial remains of upper Barremian age) are described from Villa de Leyva, Colombia by Maxwell et al. (2019), representing the first documented postcranial remains of this species.

=== New taxa ===
| Name | Novelty | Status | Authors | Age | Type locality | Country | Notes | Images |
|---|---|---|---|---|---|---|---|---|
| Arthropterygius thalassonotus | Sp. nov | Valid | Campos, Fernández & Herrera | Late Jurassic | Vaca Muerta Formation | Argentina | | |
| Chaohusaurus brevifemoralis | Sp. nov | Valid | Huang et al. | Early Triassic | | China | | |

== Sauropterygians ==
=== Research ===
- A study on the bone histology of sauropterygians, and on its implications for the knowledge of the evolution of diving adaptations of members of this group, is published by Fleischle et al. (2019).
- A study on the microstructure of ribs and vertebrae of Middle Triassic sauropterygians is published by Klein, Canoville & Houssaye (2019).
- A study on the taphonomy of sauropterygian specimens from the Middle Triassic fossil deposit of Winterswijk (the Netherlands) is published by Heijne, Klein & Sander (2019).
- The first subadult specimen of Psephochelys polyosteoderma, representing the most complete specimen of this taxon reported so far and providing new information on the anatomy of this taxon, is described from south-western China by Wang, Ma & Li (2019).
- The first adult specimen of Sinocyamodus xinpuensis reported so far is described by Wang, Li & Wu (2019).
- Two pachypleurosaur specimens are described from the Lashio Basin (Myanmar) by San et al. (2019), representing the first Triassic vertebrate fossils from Myanmar reported so far.
- A large marine sauropterygian belonging or related to Nothosauroidea is described from the Triassic (probably Olenekian) Sulphur Mountain Formation (British Columbia, Canada) by Scheyer, Neuman & Brinkman (2019), representing one of the oldest records of Sauropterygia and the northernmost occurrence of such animals in the Triassic.
- A study on life history of Nothosaurus, as indicated by growth curves determined from humeral histology, and on its implications for inferring reproduction mode of this animal, is published by Griebeler & Klein (2019).
- Description of microbodies extracted from a bone of Nothosaurus from the Middle Triassic of Poland, reported as morphologically consistent with bone cells of present-day vertebrates, is published online by Surmik et al. (2019).
- An articulated juvenile specimen of Yunguisaurus liae, providing new information on the anatomy of this species, is described from the Ladinian Falang Formation (China) by Wang et al. (2019).
- A study on hydrodynamics of neck length and thickness in plesiosaurs is published by Troelsen et al. (2019).
- Pathological fusions of neck vertebrae are reported in four plesiosaur specimens from different geological horizons by Sassoon (2019).
- Four teeth of a freshwater plesiosaur are described from the Middle Jurassic Xinhe Formation (Gansu, China) by Gao et al. (2019).
- The first plesiosaur remains from Peru are described from the Lower Cretaceous La Herradura Formation by Meza-Vélez & O'Gorman (2019).
- A review of the fossil record of Late Cretaceous Antarctic plesiosaurs is published by O'Gorman et al. (2019).
- Fossils of a large-bodied pliosaurid-like plesiosaur are described from the Middle Jurassic (Bajocian) Passwang Formation (Switzerland) by Sachs, Klug & Kear (2019).
- A study on the morphology of the teeth and skull of Megacephalosaurus eulerti, and on their implications for assessing the phylogenetic relationships of this species, is published by Madzia, Sachs & Lindgren (2019).
- An isolated pliosaurid tooth crown is described from the Hauterivian of Austria by Lukeneder & Zverkov (2019), representing the first pliosaur from this country and the second occurrence of conical-toothed pliosaurid in the Hauterivian worldwide.
- A new specimen of Stenorhynchosaurus munozi is described from the upper Barremian of the Arcillolitas Abigarradas Member of the Paja Formation (Colombia) by Páramo-Fonseca, Benavides-Cabra & Gutiérrez (2019).
- Description of fossils of plesiosaurs from the Late Jurassic of European Russia belonging or related to the genus Colymbosaurus, and a study evaluating the palaeobiogeographic implications of these fossils, is published online by Arkhangelsky et al. (2019).
- A study on the mobility of the neck of Cryptoclidus eurymerus is published by Wintrich et al. (2019).
- New plesiosaur fossils are described from the Barremian levels of the Arcillas de Morella Formation (Spain) by Quesada et al. (2019), including the first leptocleidid fossil reported from the Iberian Peninsula.
- A study on the skull morphology of two specimens of Dolichorhynchops bonneri from the Pierre Shale of South Dakota, as well as on the phylogenetic relationships of this species, is published by Morgan & O'Keefe (2019).
- A study on bone histology and ontogeny of the gravid specimen of Polycotylus latipinnus displayed at the Los Angeles County Museum of Natural History, and on its implications for interpreting a histological growth series in Dolichorhynchops bonneri, is published by O'Keefe et al. (2019).
- Skull and neck bones of an elasmosaurid plesiosaur are described from the Cenomanian Hegushi Formation (Japan) by Utsunomiya (2019), representing the oldest confirmed elasmosaurid in Japan and in East Asia.
- A postcranial skeleton of an elasmosaurid belonging or related to the genus Aristonectes is described from the uppermost Maastrichtian levels of the López de Bertodano Formation (Seymour Island, Antarctica) by O'Gorman et al. (2019), who report that this specimen is one of the largest known elasmosaurid specimens worldwide.
- Description of new fossil material of Kawanectes lafquenianum from the upper Campanian–Maastrichtian levels of the La Colonia Formation (Argentina), extending known stratigraphical range of this taxon and providing new information on diagnostic character states for K. lafquenianum, is published online by O'Gorman (2019).
- Digital endocasts of two specimens of Libonectes morgani and a polycotylid from the Turonian of Goulmima (Morocco) are reconstructed by Allemand et al. (2019).

=== New taxa ===
| Name | Novelty | Status | Authors | Age | Type locality | Country | Notes | Images |
|---|---|---|---|---|---|---|---|---|
| Cyamodus orientalis | Sp. nov | Valid | Wang et al. | Late Triassic (Carnian) | Falang Formation | China | | |
| Glyphoderma robusta | Sp. nov | Valid | Hu, Jiang & Li | Middle Triassic (Ladinian) | Falang Formation | China | | |
| Leivanectes | Gen. et sp. nov | Valid | Páramo-Fonseca et al. | Early Cretaceous (Aptian) | Paja Formation | Colombia | A member of the family Elasmosauridae. Genus includes new species L. bernardoi. | |
| Lindwurmia | Gen. et sp. nov | Valid | Vincent & Storrs | Early Jurassic (Hettangian) | | Germany | An early member of Plesiosauria. Genus includes new species L. thiuda. | |
| Microcleidus melusinae | Sp. nov | Valid | Vincent et al. | Early Jurassic (Toarcian) | | Luxembourg | A microcleidid plesiosaur. | |
| Nothosaurus cristatus | Sp. nov | Valid | Hinz, Matzke & Pfretzschner | Middle Triassic (Ladinian) | Erfurt Formation | Germany | | |
| Panzhousaurus | Gen. et sp. nov | Valid | Jiang et al. | Middle Triassic (Anisian) | | China | An early member of Eosauropterygia. Genus includes new species P. rotundirostris. | |

== Turtles ==
=== Research ===
- A study on the phylogenetic relationships of living and fossil turtles is published by Evers & Benson (2019).
- A study on the evolution and ontogenetic development of the akinetic skull of turtles, based on data from extant and fossil taxa, is published by Werneburg & Maier (2019).
- A study on the histology of shell bones of extant and fossil turtles, evaluating its utility for determination of habitat of fossil turtles, is published online by Jannello, Cerda & de la Fuente (2019).
- A study on the shell composition in proterochersids and other Triassic pantestudinates is published by Szczygielski & Sulej (2019).
- Fragmentary fossil material of a basal turtle belonging to the clade Mesochelydia is described from the Lower Cretaceous Teete locality (Yakutia, Russia) by Skutschas et al. (2019).
- Description of new fossil material of Condorchelys antiqua, and a study on the phylogenetic relationships of early turtles, is published by Sterli, de la Fuente & Rougier (2019).
- A study on the endocranial anatomy of Naomichelys speciosa is published by Paulina-Carabajal, Sterli & Werneburg (2019).
- Description of new fossil material of Peligrochelys walshae from the Paleocene (Danian) Salamanca Formation (Argentina), and a study on the phylogenetic relationships of this species, is published by Sterli & de la Fuente (2019).
- The only complete shell of Eocenochelus identified so far is described from the Eocene (Lutetian) Sobrarbe Formation (Spain) by Pérez-García et al. (2019).
- Description of new fossil material of Neusticemys neuquina from the Upper Jurassic of the Neuquén Basin (Argentina) and a study on the phylogenetic relationships of this species is published online by Ruiz, de la Fuente & Fernández (2019).
- Description of new fossil material of Plesiochelys bigleri from the Kimmeridgian Banné Marls (Switzerland), providing new information on the anatomy of this species, is published by Raselli & Anquetin (2019).
- A shell of Plesiochelys bigleri which might have been trodden on by a large sauropod dinosaur, representing the first evidence that these turtles occasionally visited tidal flat environments, is reported from the Late Jurassic of Porrentruy (Swiss Jura Mountains) by Püntener et al. (2019).
- Redescription of the holotype specimen of Nanhsiungchelys wuchingensis is published by Tong & Li (2019).
- A review of the araripemydid fossil record from Africa is published by Pérez-García (2019), who considers Laganemys tenerensis to be a junior synonym of Taquetochelys decorata.
- A revision of the fossil record of the non-baenid members of the clade Paracryptodira is published by Joyce & Anquetin (2019).
- Description of fossils of Ordosemys leios from the Lower Cretaceous Mengyin Formation (China), and a study on their implications for inferring the ecology of this species and the age of the Luohandong Formation of the Ordos Basin, is published by Li et al. (2019).
- Fossil specimens belonging to the species Ordosemys liaoxiensis, otherwise known from the older Yixian Formation of the Jehol Biota, are described from the Lower Cretaceous Hengtongshan Formation (Jilin, China) by Zhou, Wu & Rabi (2019).
- A study on shifts of range of the European pond turtle in Eastern Europe throughout the Holocene, based on data from subfossil remains from archaeological sites, is published by Nekrasova et al. (2019).
- A late Pleistocene nuchal bone is described from the Muaco site (western Venezuela) by Cadena & Carrillo-Briceño (2019), who interpret this specimen as the first undisputable fossil of a member of the genus Rhinoclemmys found east of the Andes.
- A study on the mass of North American Pleistocene tortoises, on the relationship between the mass of tortoises and their ability to maintain a viable body temperature at low ambient temperatures, and on the implications of this relationships for the knowledge of Pleistocene temperatures in the areas from which tortoise fossils are known, is published by Esker, Forman & Butler (2019).
- A study on the phylogenetic relationships and biogeographic origin of tortoises belonging to the genus Cylindraspis, based on data from near-complete mitochondrial genomes, is published by Kehlmaier et al. (2019).
- Three incomplete shells of Protestudo bessarabica are described from the late Miocene of the Belka locality by Syromyatnikova et al. (2019), representing the first record of this species from Ukraine reported so far.
- A study on the skeletal anatomy and phylogenetic relationships of Rhinochelys pulchriceps is published by Evers, Barrett & Benson (2019).
- Digital endocasts of the brain cavity and endosseous labyrinth of Rhinochelys pulchriceps are presented by Evers et al. (2019), who use these endocasts to study neuroanatomy and carotid circulation of this species.
- A gravid specimen of Desmatochelys padillai, representing the first indisputable gravid marine fossil turtle reported so far, is described from the Lower Cretaceous of Colombia by Cadena et al. (2019), who interpret this specimen as indicating that D. padillai produced rigid eggs similar to those associated with some extant and fossil freshwater and terrestrial turtles, and unlike flexible eggs produced by extant marine turtles.
- A specimen of Desmatochelys belonging or related to the species D. lowii is described from the lower Campanian Austin Formation (Coahuila, Mexico) by López-Conde et al. (2019), representing the first record of the family Protostegidae in the Late Cretaceous of Mexico reported so far.
- An isolated carapacial ossicle of a member of the genus Psephophorus is described from the lowermost Pliocene Purisima Formation (California, United States) by Fallon & Boessenecker (2019), representing the first occurrence of a sea turtle from this formation.
- An incomplete skeleton of a juvenile sea turtle belonging to the genus Eochelone is described from the Eocene (Bartonian) of the Gorny Luch locality (Krasnodar Krai, Russia) by Zvonok et al. (2019).
- Description of the anatomy of the braincase of a specimen of Syllomus aegyptiacus from the Miocene Calvert Formation (Virginia, United States) is published by Matzke & Maisch (2019).
- Description of turtle fossils from five Paleogene localities in the Crimea is published by Zvonok & Danilov (2019).
- A study on turtle remains from five Holocene localities in Thai central plain, and on their implications for the knowledge of changes of turtle biodiversity in this area over the Holocene, is published by Claude et al. (2019).

=== New taxa ===
| Name | Novelty | Status | Authors | Age | Type locality | Country | Notes | Images |
|---|---|---|---|---|---|---|---|---|
| Asmodochelys | Gen. et sp. nov | Valid | Gentry, Ebersole & Kiernan | Late Cretaceous (Campanian) | Demopolis Chalk | United States (Alabama; Mississippi) | A member of the family Ctenochelyidae. The type species is A. parhami. | |
| Axestemys infernalis | Sp. nov | Valid | Joyce, Brinkman & Lyson | Late Cretaceous (Maastrichtian) | Hell Creek Formation; Lance Formation | United States (Montana; North Dakota; South Dakota; Wyoming) | A member of the family Trionychidae. | |
| Banhxeochelys | Gen. et sp. nov | Valid | Garbin, Böhme & Joyce | Eocene (late Bartonian–late Priabonian) | | Vietnam | A pan-geoemydid. The type species is B. trani. | |
| Duboisemys | Gen. et comb. nov | Valid | Karl, Safi & Philippen | Middle Pleistocene | Trinil Beds | Indonesia | A member of the family Geoemydidae. The type species is "Hardella" isoclina Dubois (1908). | |
| Francemys | Gen. et sp. nov | Valid | Pérez-García | Early Cretaceous (Aptian) | Elrhaz Formation | Niger | A member of Pelomedusoides. The type species is F. gadoufaouaensis. | |
| Ilatardia | Gen. et sp. nov | Valid | Pérez-García | Late Cretaceous (Maastrichtian) | | Niger | A member of the family Bothremydidae. Genus includes new species I. cetiotesta. | |
| Kalasinemys | Gen. et sp. nov | Valid | Tong et al. | Late Jurassic | Phu Kradung Formation | Thailand | A member of the family Xinjiangchelyidae. Genus includes new species K. prasarttongosothi. | |
| Protoshachemys | Gen. et sp. nov | Valid | Tong et al. | Early Cretaceous (Barremian) | Sao Khua Formation | Thailand | A member of the family Adocidae. Genus includes new species P. rubra. | |
| Saxochelys | Gen. et sp. nov | Valid | Lyson, Sayler & Joyce | Late Cretaceous (Maastrichtian) | Hell Creek Formation | United States (North Dakota) | A member of the family Baenidae. Genus includes new species S. gilberti. | |
| Tasbacka germanica | Sp. nov | Valid | Karl, Gröning & Brauckmann | Late Cretaceous (Campanian) | | Germany | | |
| "Trinitichelys" maini | Sp. nov | Valid | Adrian et al. | Late Cretaceous (Cenomanian) | Woodbine Formation | United States (Texas) | A member of the family Baenidae. | |
| Wutuchelys | Gen. et sp. nov | Valid | Tong et al. | Early Eocene | Wutu Formation | China | A stem-testudinoid. Genus includes new species W. eocenica. | |

== Archosauriformes ==
=== General research ===
- A study on the impact of the Triassic–Jurassic extinction event on archosauromorph reptiles is published by Allen et al. (2019).
- A diverse assemblage of archosauriform teeth is described from the Upper Triassic Tiki Formation (India) by Ray, Bhat & Datta (2019).
- A study on archosauriform teeth assemblage from the Middle Triassic Manda Beds (Tanzania), aiming to determine the taxonomic composition of that collection and its implications for the knowledge of the diversity and evolution of archosauriforms from the Manda Beds, is published by Hoffman et al. (2019).

=== Other archosauriforms ===
==== Research ====
- Virtual endocast of Proterosuchus fergusi is reconstructed by Brown et al. (2019), who evaluate the implications of the endocranial anatomy of this species for the knowledge of its life habits.
- Redescription of the anatomy of the holotype specimen of Garjainia prima is published by Ezcurra et al. (2019), who consider Vjushkovia triplicostata to be a junior synonym of G. prima.
- A study on the skull anatomy and taxonomic validity of Vjushkovia triplicostata is published by Butler et al. (2019).
- A study on the anatomy and phylogenetic relationships of Guchengosuchus shiguaiensis is published by Butler et al. (2019).
- A study on the anatomy and phylogenetic relationships of Chalishevia cothurnata is published by Butler et al. (2019).
- A study on the anatomy, ecomorphology and bone microstructure of members of Proterochampsia, and on their implications for inferring the lifestyles of these reptiles, is published by Arcucci, Previtera & Mancuso (2019).
- Two new rhadinosuchine proterochampsid specimens are described from the Chañares Formation (Argentina) by Ezcurra et al. (2019).
- A study on the morphology and affinities of isolated phytosaur teeth from the Upper Triassic Tiki Formation (India) is published online by Datta, Kumar & Ray (2019).

==== New taxa ====
| Name | Novelty | Status | Authors | Age | Type locality | Country | Notes | Images |
|---|---|---|---|---|---|---|---|---|
| Antarctanax | Gen. et sp. nov | Valid | Peecook, Smith & Sidor | Triassic | Fremouw Formation | Antarctica | An archosauriform archosauromorph reptile. The type species is A. shackletoni. | |
| Mystriosuchus steinbergeri | Sp. nov | Valid | Butler et al. | Late Triassic (Norian) | Dachstein Limestone | Austria | A phytosaur. | |
| Volcanosuchus | Gen. et sp. nov | Valid | Datta, Ray & Bandyopadhyay | Late Triassic | Tiki Formation | India | A phytosaur. Genus includes new species V. statisticae. | |

== Other reptiles ==
=== Research ===
- New information on a specimen of the mesosaur species Stereosternum tumidum affected by congenital scoliosis, first described by Szczygielski et al. (2017), is published by Szczygielski et al. (2019).
- A study on bone histology and growth patterns of Stereosternum tumidum and Brazilosaurus sanpauloensis is published by Klein et al. (2019).
- New information on the anatomy of Feeserpeton oklahomensis is presented by MacDougall et al. (2019).
- Description of the anatomy of a new specimen of Kapes bentoni from the Otter Sandstone of Devon (United Kingdom, and a study on the phylogenetic relationships of this species, is published by Zaher, Coram & Benton (2019).
- A study on the skull anatomy and phylogenetic relationships of Embrithosaurus schwarzi is published online by Van den Brandt, Abdala & Rubidge (2019).
- Redescription of the pareiasaur species "Anthodon" haughtoni from the Permian Usili Formation (Tanzania) is published by Maisch & Matzke (2019).
- X-ray diffraction study of bone fragments of Deltavjatia vjatkensis from the Kotelnich vertebrate fossil site (Russia) is published by Ryanskaya et al. (2019).
- A study on the composition and structure of bone fragments of Deltavjatia vjatkensis from the Kotelnich vertebrate fossil site is published by Kiseleva et al. (2019), who report white blood cell-like structures, interpreted as possible leukocytes.
- A study on the ontogenetic changes in long-bone and rib histology of Deltavjatia rossica and Scutosaurus karpinskii is published by Boitsova et al. (2019).
- A study on the microstructure of limb bones, a rib fragment and osteoderms of Provelosaurus americanus is published online by Farias, Schultz & Soares (2019).
- A study on the species richness and morphological diversity of parareptiles over the course of their evolutionary history is published by MacDougall, Brocklehurst & Fröbisch (2019).
- A study testing whether the consistent evolutionary size increase in captorhinids led to major re-patterning in their long bone structure is published by Romano & Rubidge (2019).
- A study on the anatomy of the mandible and on the phylogenetic relationships of Moradisaurus grandis, based on data from new fossil material from the upper Permian Moradi Formation of Niger, is published by Modesto et al. (2019).
- Redescription of the anatomy of Orovenator mayorum and a study on the phylogenetic relationships of this species is published by Ford & Benson (2019), who recover both Orovenator and varanopids (usually regarded as synapsids) as diapsid reptiles.
- A study on the early evolution of the diel activity patterns in diapsid lineages, focusing on the common ancestor branch of living birds, is published by Yu & Wang (2019).
- A study on the morphological diversity and rates of morphological evolution of extinct and extant rhynchocephalians published by Herrera-Flores, Stubbs & Benton (2017) is criticized by Vaux et al. (2019).
- A study on the skull morphology of Clevosaurus hudsoni and Clevosaurus cambrica is published by Chambi-Trowell, Whiteside & Benton (2019).
- A case study of an osteosarcoma affecting a femur of a specimen of Pappochelys rosinae is published by Haridy et al. (2019).
- A study on the microstructure of bones of Pappochelys rosinae is published by Schoch et al. (2019).
- An isolated vertebra of a choristoderan reptile is described from the Cenomanian Essen Greensand Formation (Germany) by Reiss et al. (2019), representing the first identifiable European choristoderan from the Kimmeridgian–Campanian interval reported so far.
- Description of new fossil material of Khurendukhosaurus from the Albian Khuren Dukh Formation (Mongolia) and a study on the anatomy and phylogenetic relationships of this reptile is published by Matsumoto et al. (2019).
- Neck vertebrae of a long-necked tanystropheid reptile are described from the Middle Triassic Moenkopi Formation by Formoso et al. (2019).
- A study on the bone histology of Azendohsaurus laaroussii, and on its implications for the knowledge of evolution of endothermy in Archosauromorpha, is published by Cubo & Jalil (2019).
- A study on the anatomy of the postcranial skeleton of Teraterpeton hrynewichorum, as well as on the phylogenetic relationships of this species, is published by Pritchard & Sues (2019).
- Partial maxilla of a hyperodapedontine rhynchosaur, possessing a morphology that differs from those of other South American rhynchosaur species, is described from the Upper Triassic Ischigualasto Formation (Argentina) by Gentil & Ezcurra (2019).
- A study on the anatomy of the braincase and middle and inner ears of Mesosuchus browni is published by Sobral & Müller (2019).
- A study on the anatomy of the holotype of Teyujagua paradoxa and on the phylogenetic relationships of this species is published online by Pinheiro, De Simão-Oliveira & Butler (2019).

=== New taxa ===
| Name | Novelty | Status | Authors | Age | Type locality | Country | Notes | Images |
|---|---|---|---|---|---|---|---|---|
| Ancistronychus | Gen. et sp. nov | Valid | Gonçalves & Sidor | Late Triassic | Chinle Formation | United States (Arizona) | A member of Drepanosauromorpha. The type species is A. paradoxus. | |
| Captorhinus kierani | Sp. nov | | DeBraga, Bevitt & Reisz | Permian (Artinskian) | | United States | | |
| Carbonodraco | Gen. et sp. nov | Valid | Mann et al. | Carboniferous (Moscovian) | Allegheny Group | United States | A member of the family Acleistorhinidae. The type species is C. lundi. Announced in 2019; the correction including the required ZooBank accession number was published in 2020. | |
| Clevosaurus hadroprodon | Sp. nov | | Hsiou et al. | Late Triassic (Carnian) | Santa Maria Formation | Brazil | | |
| Coeruleodraco | Gen. et sp. nov | Valid | Matsumoto et al. | Late Jurassic (Oxfordian) | Tiaojishan Formation | China | A member of Choristodera. Genus includes new species C. jurassicus. | |
| Patagosphenos | Gen. et sp. nov | Valid | Gentil et al. | Late Cretaceous (Turonian) | Huincul Formation | Argentina | An eilenodontine rhynchocephalian. Genus includes new species P. watuku. | |
| Sclerostropheus | Gen. et comb. nov | Valid | Spiekman & Scheyer | Late Triassic (Norian) | | Italy | A member of the family Tanystropheidae; a new genus for "Tanystropheus" fossai Wild (1980). | |
| Shihtienfenia completus | Sp. nov | Valid | Wang, Yi & Liu | Permian | Sunjiagou Formation | China | A pareiasaur. | |

== General research ==
Research concerning more than one group of reptiles listed above.

- A revision of existing records of marine reptiles known from the Jurassic and Cretaceous of Siberia is published by Rogov et al. (2019).
- Description of fossils of marine reptiles from the Late Jurassic of the Krzyżanowice locality (Poland) and a study evaluating the palaeobiogeographic implications of these fossils is published by Tyborowski & Błażejowski (2019).
