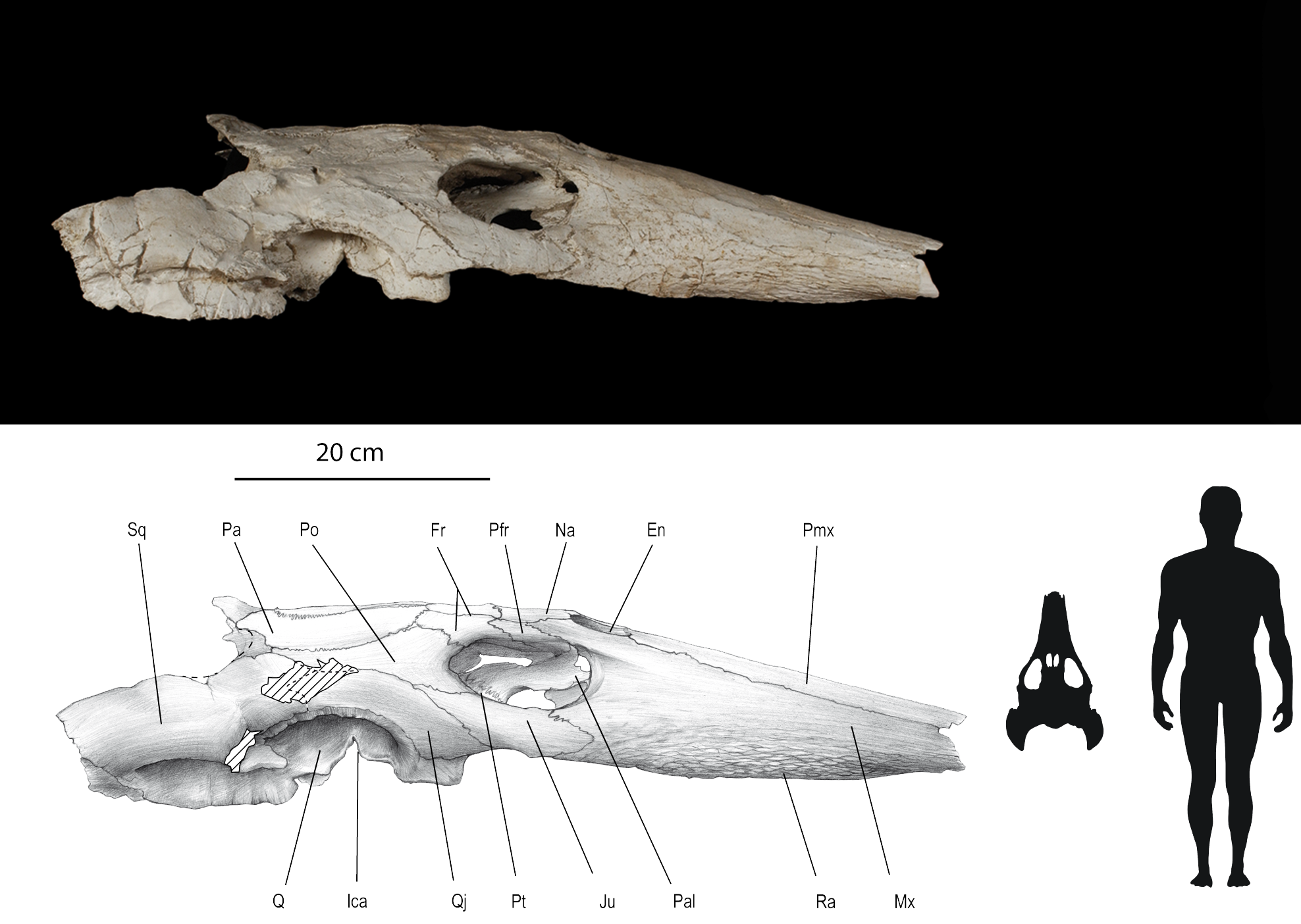
- Skull and size comparison of Ocepechelon

Scientific classification
- Kingdom: Animalia
- Phylum: Chordata
- Class: Reptilia
- Order: Testudines
- Suborder: Cryptodira
- Clade: Panchelonioidea (?)
- Family: †Protostegidae
- Genus: †Ocepechelon; Bardet et al, 2013

Type species
- †Ocepechelon bouyai Bardet et al, 2013

= Ocepechelon =

Ocepechelon Temporal range: Maastrichtian ~67 Ma

Extinct genus of turtles

Ocepechelon is an extinct genus of giant protostegid sea turtle known from the Late Cretaceous (late Maastrichtian stage, 67 Myr) of Morocco. The feeding apparatus of Ocepechelon, a bony pipette-like snout, is unique among tetrapods and shares unique convergences with both syngnathid fishes (unique long tubular bony snout ending in a rounded and forward directed mouth) and beaked whales (large size and elongated edentulous jaws).

== Discovery ==
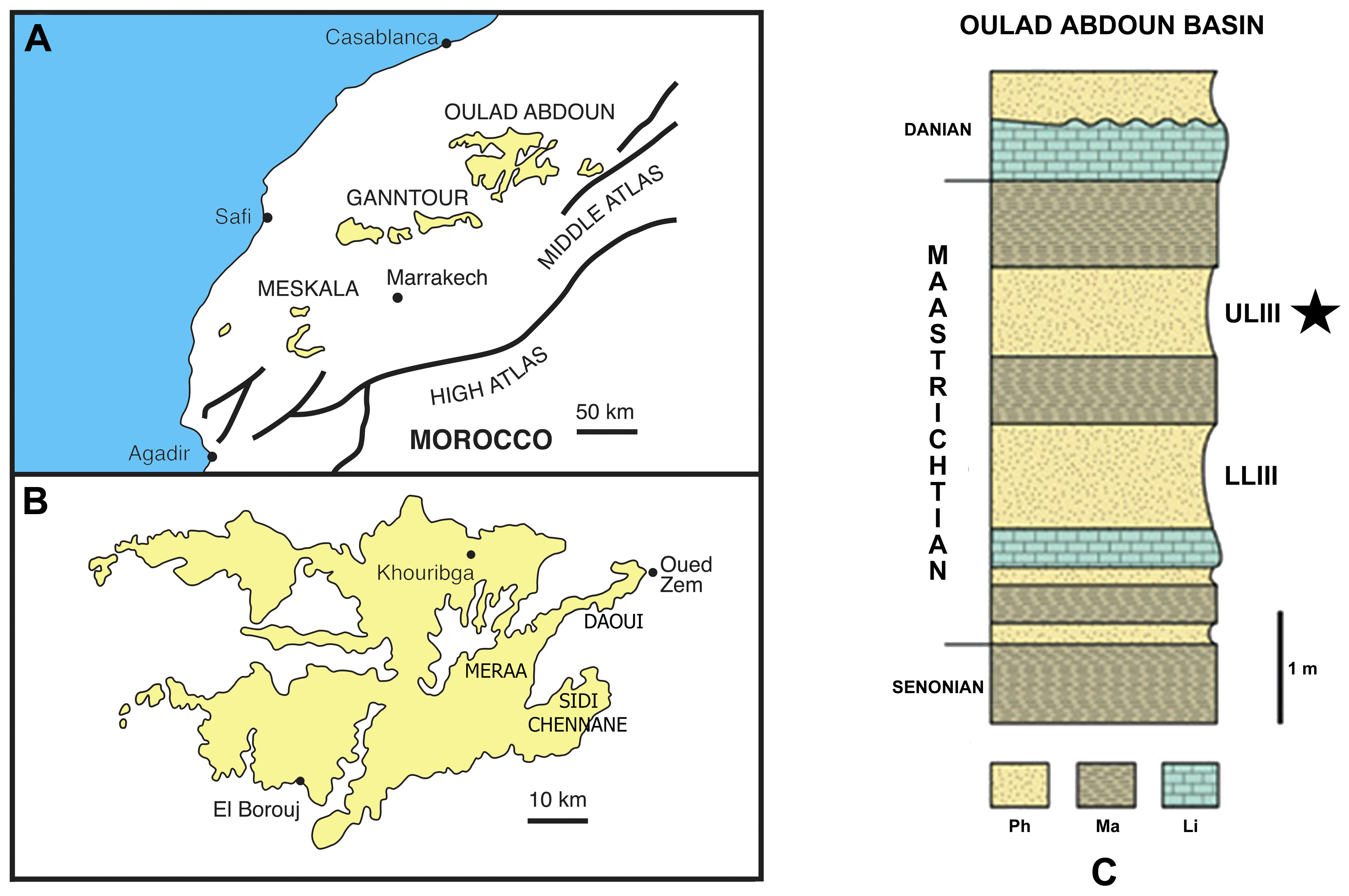
Location map and stratigraphy

Ocepechelon was discovered in phosphatic deposits of the Oulad Abdoun Basin, Khouribga Province of Morocco. It is known from the holotype OCP DEK/GE 516, a complete but isolated 70-cm-long skull, making it one of the largest marine turtles ever described. It was first named by Nathalie Bardet, Nour-Eddine Jalil, France de Lapparent de Broin, Damien Germain, Olivier Lambert and Mbarek Amaghzaz in 2013, and the type species is Ocepechelon bouyai.

== Description ==
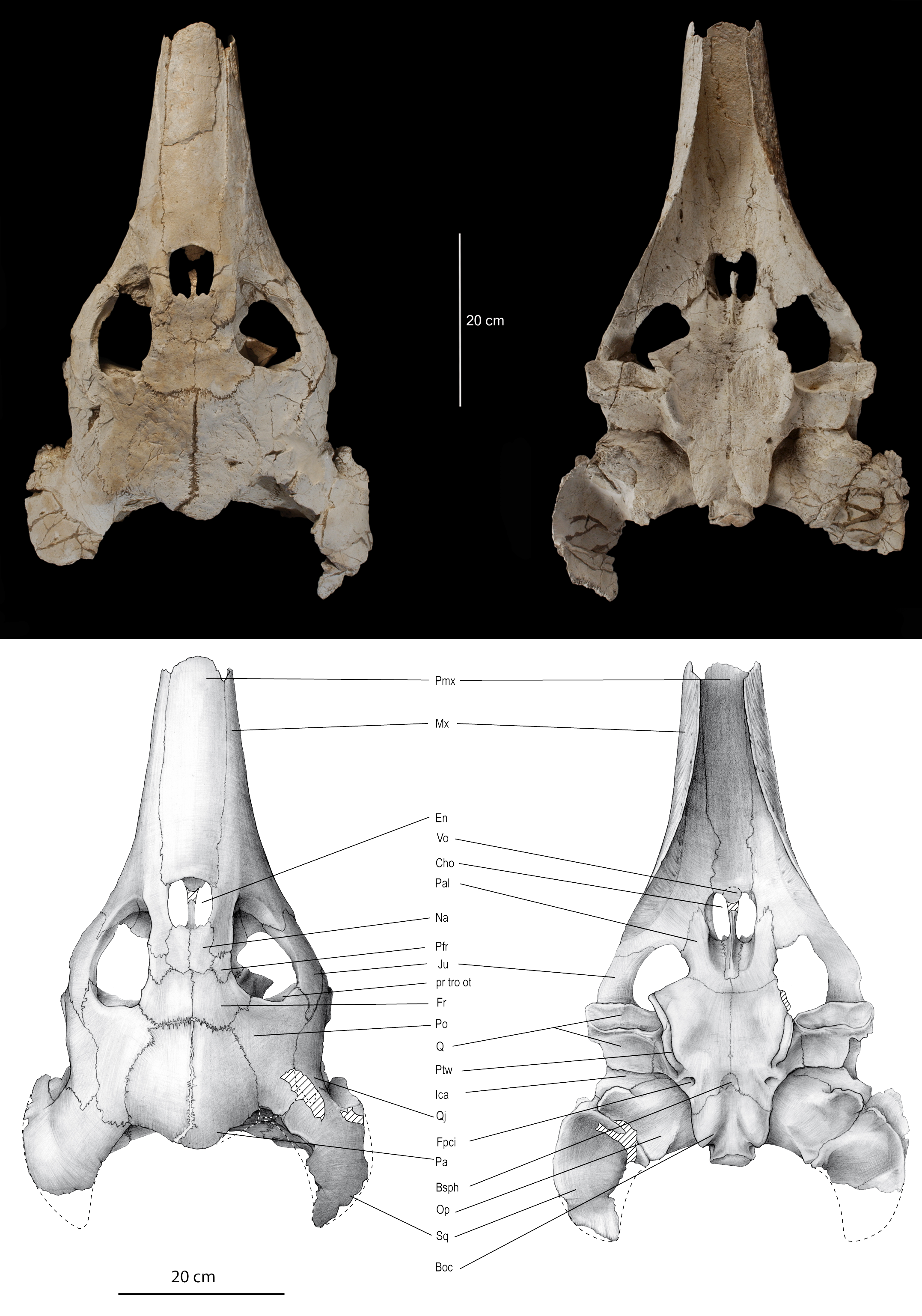
Upper and underside of skull

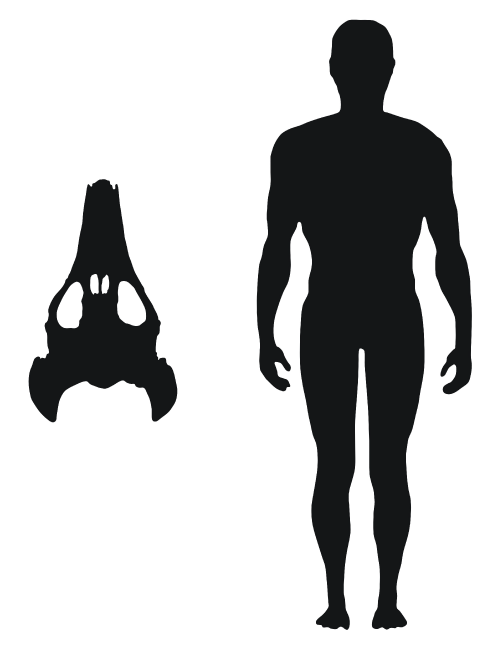
Size of the skull compared to a human

Ocepechelon is known solely from an isolated yet complete skull, 70 centimetres (28 in) in length. From the size of the skull, it must have been one of the largest turtles that ever lived, with estimated carapace length of 130–150 centimetres (4.3–4.9 ft) and total length of 240 centimetres (7.9 ft). The skull of this genus was not only exceptional in size, but also in appearance: large at the back, it narrowed at the front to form a sort of elongated, narrow, bony funnel. The lower jaw and hyoid remain unknown.

The skull roof of Ocepechelon is dorsoventrally compressed, with a wide cerebral cavity and a lateral wall of the cranial cavity that is bowed anteromedially. Its longirostrine snout has been compared to a pipette, and is unique among all tetrapods. Its flattened, streamlined skull, as well as the dorsal position of its orbits and nares, suggest it was a seagoing species which hunted close to the water's surface. This hypothesis is supported by sedimentological analysis and its skull anatomy. Several aspects of Ocepechelon's skull anatomy suggest it may have been a suction feeder, namely the tube-like upper jaw. In general, the skull must have looked something like a toothless crocodile: there were no teeth, but the eyes were upturned, as were the nostrils, which were set far back. It is the only tetrapod to have developed an evolutionary convergence with both syngnathid fishes and beaked whales, since it possessed a large head but a long, narrow, toothless snout.

Like other genera in the Panchelonioidea, it likely possessed flippers, allowing an active swimming lifestyle. Material potentially referable to Ocepechelon supports this hypothesis.

== Classification ==
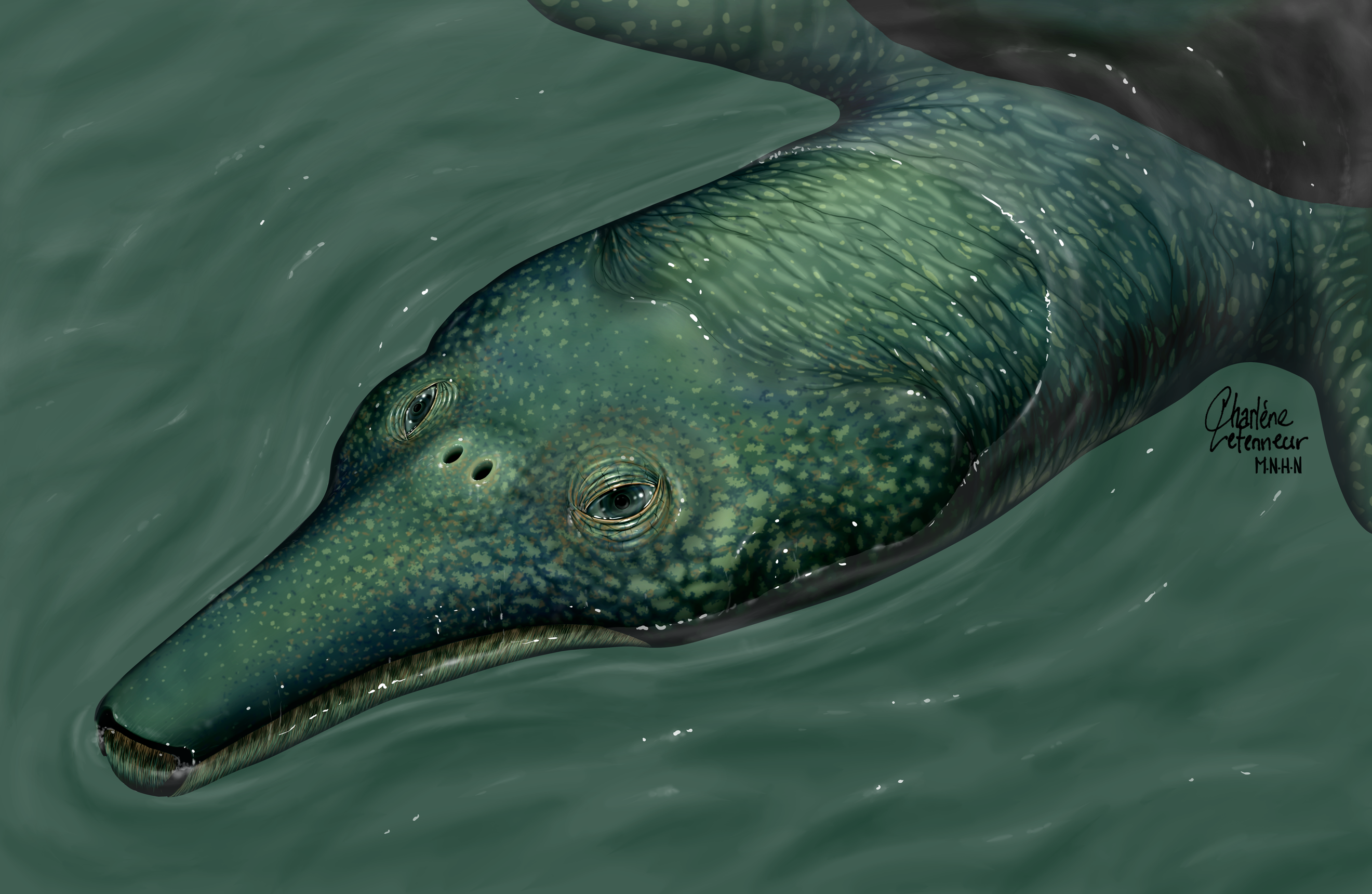
Life restoration of Ocepechelon bouyai.

Due to the limited fossil material available, Bardet et al. (2013) used numerous methods to assess the phylogenetic position of the animal. The removal of outgroup taxa, except for the hypothetical taxon, deliberated some relationships and showed that Ocepechelon and Bouliachelys could be basal dermochelyoids, forming a polytomy with the Dermochelyidae and Protostegidae. The inclusion of Chelomacryptodira resolved this polytomy, and suggested that Ocepechelon was the most basal dermochelyid known.

Below is a cladogram from the description of Ocepechelon, by Bardet et al. (2013).

- Protostegidae
  - Calcarichelys
  - Syllomus
  - - - Ocepechelon
      - Alienochelys
    - - Protostega
      - Archelon
  - - Chelosphargis
    - - Desmatochelys lowi
      - - Bouliachelys
        - - Santanachelys
          - Desmatochelys padillaii

However, Scavezzoni & Fischer (2018), in their phylogenetic analysis, showed that Dermatochelyidae and Protostegidae did not form a clade, and classified Ocepechelon within Protostegidae, as a sister taxon to Alienochelys. Below is a subsequent phylogeny based on Scavezzoni & Fischer's cladogram and Evers et al. (2019) who both recovered it as a protostegid.

- Panchelonioidea
  - †Toxochelys
  - - †Protostegidae
      - - †Desmatochelys
        - - †Ocepechelon
          - - †Archelon
            - †Protostega
      - †Calcarichelys
      - †Bouliachelys
      - - †Chelosphargis
        - - †Santanachelys
          - †Notochelone
          - †Rhinochelys
    - Chelonioidea
      - †Corsochelys
      - Dermochelyidae
      - - †Nichollsemys
        - - †Allopleuron
          - - Cheloniidae
            - - †Argillochelys
              - †Procolpochelys
              - - †Eochelone
                - †Puppigerus
              - - †Ctenochelys
                - †Peritresius
                - †Cabindachelys

== Paleobiology ==
Suction feeding by an Ocepechelon (animation)

The remarkable similarities between Ocepechelon and beaked whales (as well as syngnathid fishes) have led paleontologists to speculate about Ocepechelon's possible mode of feeding. Since both beaked whales and syngnathids are organisms that feed by sucking (i.e., creating a vacuum to suck in small prey), paleontologists believe that Ocepechelon may have also fed in this way. This animal probably swam near the surface of the warm waters it inhabited, swallowing large quantities of small fish, cephalopods and jellyfish. Based on comparisons with other present-day turtles, it is also speculated that Ocepechelon may have been equipped with small spiny structures within its throat. These papillae are currently present in the leatherback sea turtle (one of Ocepechelon's closest relatives), and not only filter water, but also create a sharp barrier to prey attempting to escape. Ocepechelon may have had a similar structure, as well as other papillae along the edges of the mouth.
