= Cabindachelys =

Cabindachelys Temporal range: Late Paleocene 61.7–58.7 Ma

Scientific classification
- Kingdom: Animalia
- Phylum: Chordata
- Class: Reptilia
- Order: Testudines
- Suborder: Cryptodira
- Clade: Pancheloniidae
- Genus: †Cabindachelys; Myers et al., 2017

Species
- †C. landanensis Myers et al., 2017

Extinct genus of turtles

Cabindachelys is a genus of extinct sea turtles. The only known species is Cabindachelys landanensis.

== Fossils ==
A partial skull of the Cabindachelys has been found in Cabinda, Angola, by Timothy S. Myers, Michael J. Polcyn, Octávio Mateus, Diana P. Vineyard, A. O. Gonçalves, Louis L. Jacobs.

== Habitat ==
Cabindachelys lived in deep subtidal indents of the shores of Cabinda, Angola.

== Etymology ==
The name of Cabindachelys is a mixture of Cabinda the place where it lived and the Greek name for turtle.

== Phylogeny ==
- Panchelonioidea
  - †Toxochelys
  - - †Protostegidae
    - Chelonioidea
      - †Corsochelys
      - Dermochelyidae
      - - †Nichollsemys
        - - †Allopleuron
          - - Cheloniidae
            - - †Argillochelys
              - †Procolpochelys
              - - †Eochelone
                - †Puppigerus
              - - †Ctenochelys
                - †Peritresius
                - †Cabindachelys
