= Demopolis Chalk =

Geological formation in the United States

- Stratigraphic range: Upper Cretaceous
- Type: Geological formation
- Unit of: Selma Group
- Sub-units: Bluffport Marl Member
- Underlies: Ripley Formation
- Overlies: Mooreville Chalk Formation

Lithology
- Primary: Chalk

Location
- Region: Alabama, Mississippi, Tennessee
- Country: United States

Type section
- Named for: Demopolis, Alabama

The Demopolis Chalk is a geological formation in North America, within the U.S. states of Alabama, Mississippi, and Tennessee. The chalk was formed by pelagic sediments deposited along the eastern edge of the Mississippi embayment during the middle Campanian age of the Late Cretaceous. It is a unit of the Selma Group and consists of the upper Bluffport Marl Member and a lower unnamed member. Dinosaur and mosasaur remains are among the fossils that have been recovered from the Demopolis Chalk.

== Vertebrate paleofauna ==
=== Fish ===
==== Cartilaginous fish ====
Cartilaginous fish of the Demopolis Chalk Formation
| Genus | Species | Presence | Notes | Images |
|---|---|---|---|---|
| Chimaeriformes indet. | | Alabama | | Ischyrhiza mira rostral spines Teeth of Scapanorhynchus texanus Squalicorax sp. |
| Cretolamna | C. appendiculata | Alabama | An otodontid | Ischyrhiza mira rostral spines Teeth of Scapanorhynchus texanus Squalicorax sp. |
| Ischyrhiza | I. mira | Alabama | A sclerorhynchid | Ischyrhiza mira rostral spines Teeth of Scapanorhynchus texanus Squalicorax sp. |
| Scapanorhynchus | S. texanus | Alabama | A mitsukurinid | Ischyrhiza mira rostral spines Teeth of Scapanorhynchus texanus Squalicorax sp. |
| Serratolamna | S. serrata? | Alabama | A lamniform shark | Ischyrhiza mira rostral spines Teeth of Scapanorhynchus texanus Squalicorax sp. |
| Squalicorax | S. kaupi | Alabama | Anacoracids | Ischyrhiza mira rostral spines Teeth of Scapanorhynchus texanus Squalicorax sp. |
| Squalicorax | S. pristodontus | Alabama | Anacoracids | Ischyrhiza mira rostral spines Teeth of Scapanorhynchus texanus Squalicorax sp. |
| Squalicorax | S. sp. | Alabama | Anacoracids | Ischyrhiza mira rostral spines Teeth of Scapanorhynchus texanus Squalicorax sp. |

==== Bony fish ====
Bony fish of the Demopolis Chalk Formation
| Genus | Species | Presence | Notes | Images |
|---|---|---|---|---|
| Enchodus | E. ferox | Alabama | Enchodontids | Enchodus petrosus Protosphyraena Stratodus |
| Enchodus | E. gladiolus | Alabama | Enchodontids | Enchodus petrosus Protosphyraena Stratodus |
| Enchodus | E. petrosus | Alabama | Enchodontids | Enchodus petrosus Protosphyraena Stratodus |
| Protosphyraena | P. sp. | Alabama | A pachycormiform | Enchodus petrosus Protosphyraena Stratodus |
| Saurodon | S. sp. | Alabama | An ichthyodectiform | Enchodus petrosus Protosphyraena Stratodus |
| Stratodus | S. sp. | Alabama | An aulopiform | Enchodus petrosus Protosphyraena Stratodus |
| Xiphactinus | X. vetus | | An ichthyodectid | Enchodus petrosus Protosphyraena Stratodus |

=== Reptiles ===
==== Dinosaurs ====
Indeterminate hadrosaurid remains have been found in Tennessee. Possible indeterminate tyrannosaurid remains have been found in Alabama.

Dinosaurs of the Demopolis Chalk Formation
| Genus | Species | Presence | Notes | Images |
|---|---|---|---|---|
| Appalachiosaurus | A. montgomeriensis | Geographically present in Alabama. | A tyrannosauroid | Appalachiosaurus |

==== Crocodylians ====
Crocodylians of the Demopolis Chalk Formation
| Genus | Species | Presence | Notes | Images |
|---|---|---|---|---|
| Borealosuchus | B. sp. | Alabama | An eusuchian | Borealosuchus skull |

==== Mosasaurs ====
Mosasaurs of the Demopolis Chalk
| Genus | Species | Presence | Notes | Images |
|---|---|---|---|---|
| Clidastes | C. propython | Alabama | A mosasaurine | Clidastes propython Plioplatecarpus |
| Halisaurus | H. sp. | Alabama | A halisaurine | Clidastes propython Plioplatecarpus |
| Mosasaurus | M. conodon | Alabama | A mosasaurine | Clidastes propython Plioplatecarpus |
| Mosasaurus | M. cf. missouriensis | Alabama | A mosasaurine | Clidastes propython Plioplatecarpus |
| Platecarpus | P. cf. somenensis | Alabama and Mississippi | A plioplatecarpine | Clidastes propython Plioplatecarpus |
| Plioplatecarpus | P. sp. nov. | Mississippi | A plioplatecarpine | Clidastes propython Plioplatecarpus |
| Tylosaurus | T. sp. | Alabama and Mississippi | A tylosaurine | Clidastes propython Plioplatecarpus |

==== Turtles ====
Turtles of the Demopolis Chalk
| Genus | Species | Presence | Notes | Images |
|---|---|---|---|---|
| Asmodochelys | A. parhami | Geographically present in Alabama and Mississippi. | A marine ctenochelyid turtle | Protostega gigas |
| Chedighaii | C. barberi | Alabama | A bothremydid | Protostega gigas |
| Ctenochelys | C. cf. tennuitesta | Alabama | A ctenochelyid | Protostega gigas |
| Prionochelys | P. matutina? | Alabama | A ctenochelyid | Protostega gigas |
| Protostega | P. gigas | Alabama | A protostegid | Protostega gigas |

== See also ==
- List of dinosaur-bearing rock formations
- List of fossil sites
