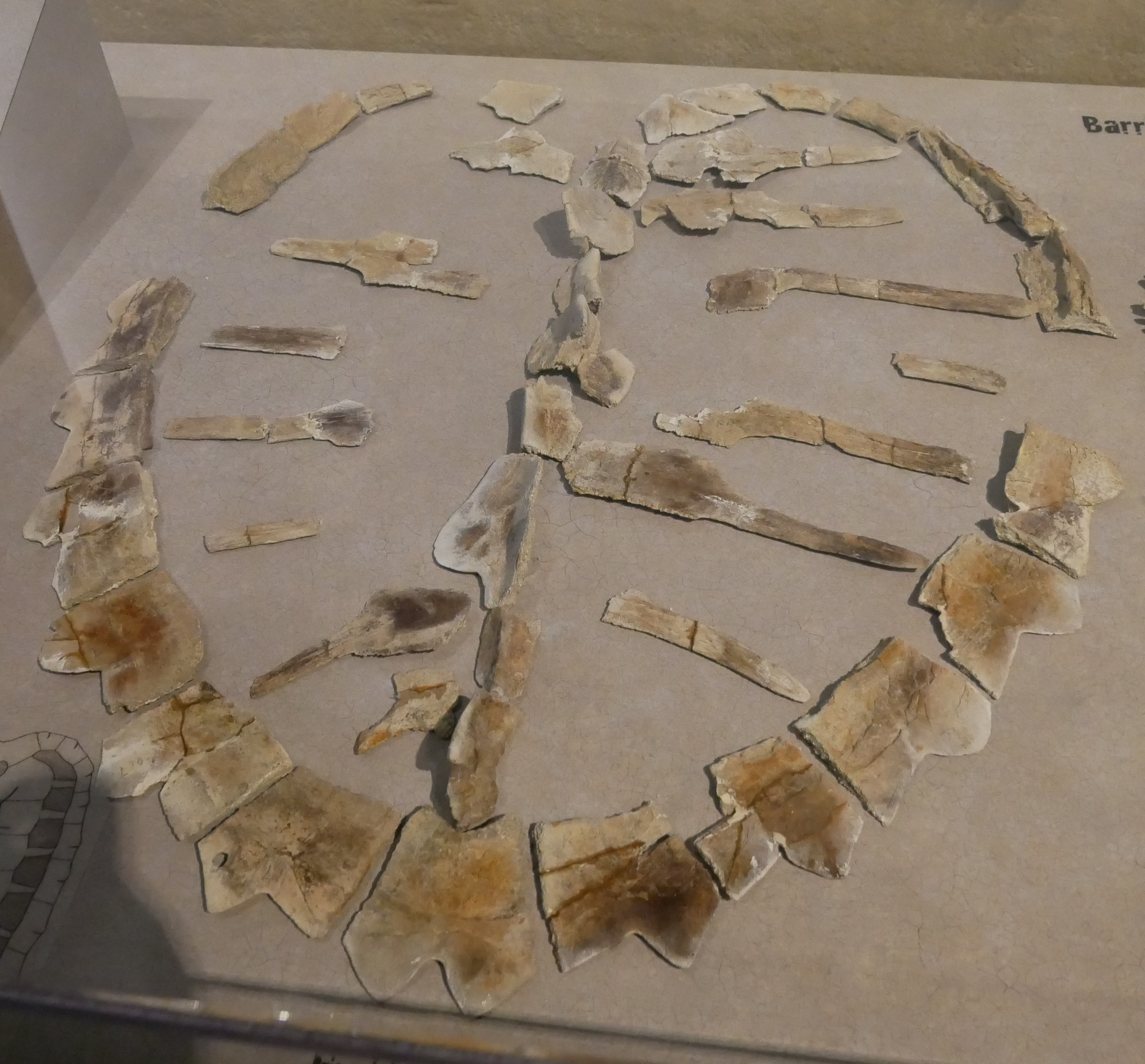
- Partial carapace, McWane Science Center

Scientific classification
- Kingdom: Animalia
- Phylum: Chordata
- Class: Reptilia
- Order: Testudines
- Suborder: Cryptodira
- Family: †Ctenochelyidae
- Genus: †Prionochelys
- Species: †P. matutina

Binomial name
- †Prionochelys matutina Zangerl, 1953

= Prionochelys =

Prionochelys Temporal range: Santonian–Campanian

Extinct genus of sea turtles

Prionochelys is an extinct genus of pancheloniid from the Mooreville Chalk and Eutaw Formations of Alabama. It consists of a single species, P. matutina.

== Taxonomy ==
Prionochelys was originally assigned to the family Toxochelyidae. A 2018 paper found it to be on the stem of Chelonioidea, the family to which most modern sea turtles belong, forming a monophyletic grouping named as Ctenochelyidae with Ctenochelys and Peritresius. Below is a cladogram from the analysis by Gentry, Ebersole & Kiernan (2019):

- Pan-Chelonioidea
  - †Angolachelonia
  - - †Protostegidae
    - - †Toxochelys latiremis
      - - Chelonioidea
        - †Ctenochelyidae
          - †Asmodochelys parhami
          - - †Prionochelys matutina
            - †Ctenochelys acris
            - †Ctenochelys stenoporus
            - †Peritresius ornatus
            - †Peritresius martini
