= Athecata =

Athecata may refer to:

- A synonym of Anthomedusae, an order of the Hydrozoa, a class of marine invertebrates belonging to the phylum Cnidaria.
- A synonym of Dermochelyidae, a family of sea turtles.
