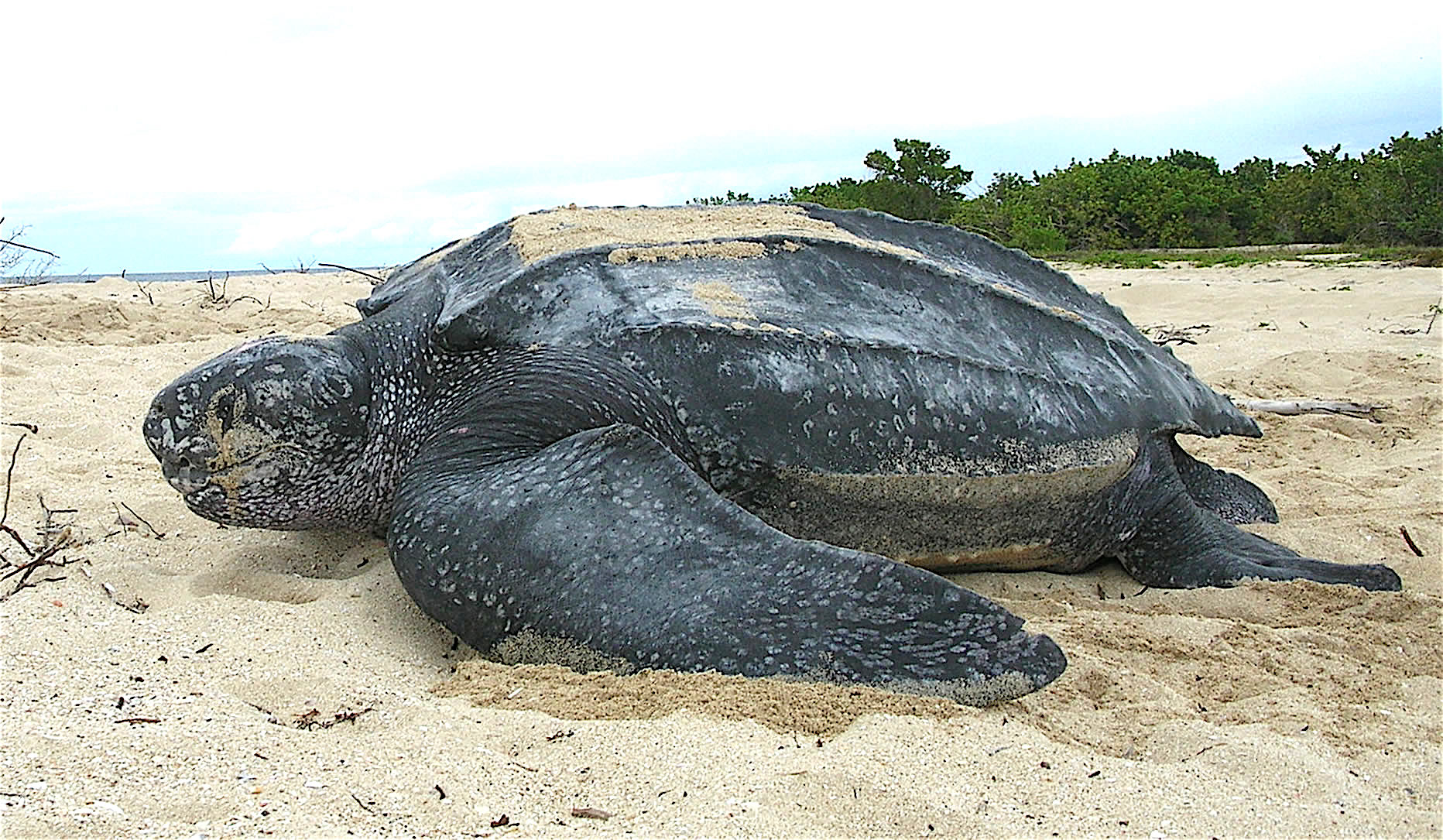
- Leatherback turtles are the only living representative of the dermochelyid family.

Scientific classification
- Kingdom: Animalia
- Phylum: Chordata
- Class: Reptilia
- Order: Testudines
- Suborder: Cryptodira
- Superfamily: Chelonioidea
- Family: Dermochelyidae; Fitzinger, 1843

Genera
- See text.

Synonyms
- Sphargidae Gray, 1825; Dermatochelydae Fitzinger, 1843; Athecae Cope, 1871; Athecata Lydekker, 1889; Dermochelyidae Lydekker, 1889

= Dermochelyidae =

Dermochelyidae Temporal range: Campanian-Holocene, 83.6–0 Ma Possible Santonian records

Family of turtles

Dermochelyidae is a family of sea turtles which has seven extinct genera and one extant genus, containing one living species, the leatherback sea turtle (Dermochelys coriacea). The oldest fossils of the group date to the Late Cretaceous.

== Classification of known genera ==
The following list is based on Gentry et al. (2025):

- Genus †Arabemys Tong et al., 1999
- Genus †Eosphargis Lydekker, 1889
- Genus †Gigantochelys Mousa et al., 2026
- Genus †Helianthochelys Sterli et al., 2025
- Genus †Mesodermochelys Hirayama & Chitoku, 1996
- Subfamily Dermochelyinae Weems, 1988
  - Tribe †Uelocini Gentry et al., 2025
    - Genus †Cardiochelys Moody, 1993
    - Genus †Natemys Wood, Johnson-Gove, Gaffney & Maley, 1996
    - Genus †Ueloca Gentry et al., 2025
    - Genus †Zealosphargis Gentry et al., 2025
  - Tribe Dermochelyini Gentry et al., 2025
    - Genus †Cosmochelys Andrews, 1919
    - Genus Dermochelys Blainville, 1816 (including the extant leatherback turtle)
    - Genus †Egyptemys Wood, Johnson-Gove, Gaffney & Maley, 1996
    - Genus †Psephophorus von Meyer, 1847

The Late Cretaceous Japanese sea turtle †Mesodermochelys was formerly considered a member of this family, which would make it one of the oldest members of the group. However, a 2012 taxonomic revision found it to not be closely related to Dermochelys, and more likely a basal panchelonioid. Similarly, the genus †Arabemys Tong et al., 1999 from the Maastrichtian or Early Eocene of Saudi Arabia shows osteoderm morphology unknown among any other dermochelyid, and may be an archosaur instead. Excluding these two, the earliest known dermochelyids include is the basal genera Gigantochelys, from the Maastrichtian (Late Cretaceous) of Egypt and Eosphargis from the ?Late Paleocene and Early Eocene of Europe and North America.

The two tribes of Dermochelyinae appear to have diverged in the Middle Eocene. The Uelocini saw most of its diversity in the Paleogene, with the last surviving member being Natemys from the Early Miocene. Dermochelyini also saw several genera appear around the Eocene, and Psephophorus survived up to the end of the Miocene, but Dermochelys is the only extant member.

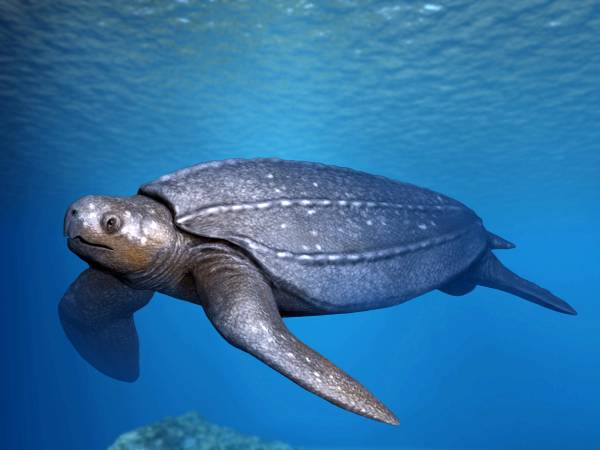
Hypothetical reconstruction of Zealosphargis terrypratchetti

== Phylogeny ==
Evers et al. (2019):

- Panchelonioidea
  - †Toxochelys
  - - †Protostegidae
    - Chelonioidea
      - †Corsochelys
      - Dermochelyidae
      - - †Nichollsemys
        - - †Allopleuron
          - - Cheloniidae
            - - †Argillochelys
              - †Procolpochelys
              - - †Eochelone
                - †Puppigerus
              - - †Ctenochelys
                - †Peritresius
                - †Cabindachelys

== Bibliography ==
- Rhodin, Anders G.J.; van Dijk, Peter Paul; Inverson, John B.; Shaffer, H. Bradley; Roger, Bour (2011-12-31). "Turtles of the world, 2011 update: Annotated checklist of taxonomy, synonymy, distribution and conservation status" (PDF). Chelonian Research Monographs. 5. Archived from the original (PDF) on 2012-01-31.
