= Arabemys =

Arabemys crassiscutata Temporal range: Paleocene–Early Eocene

Scientific classification
- Domain: Eukaryota
- Kingdom: Animalia
- Phylum: Chordata
- Class: Reptilia
- Order: Testudines
- Suborder: Cryptodira
- Superfamily: Chelonioidea
- Family: Dermochelyidae
- Genus: †Arabemys; Tong et al., 1999
- Species: †A. crassiscutata

Binomial name
- †Arabemys crassiscutata Tong et al., 1999

Extinct genus of turtles

Arabemys is an extinct genus of sea turtle. It was first named in 1999, and contains one species, A. crassiscutata. It is known from deposits of Late Paleocene or Early Eocene age near the village of Linah in northern Saudi Arabia (28°44′2″N 43°52′25″E).
