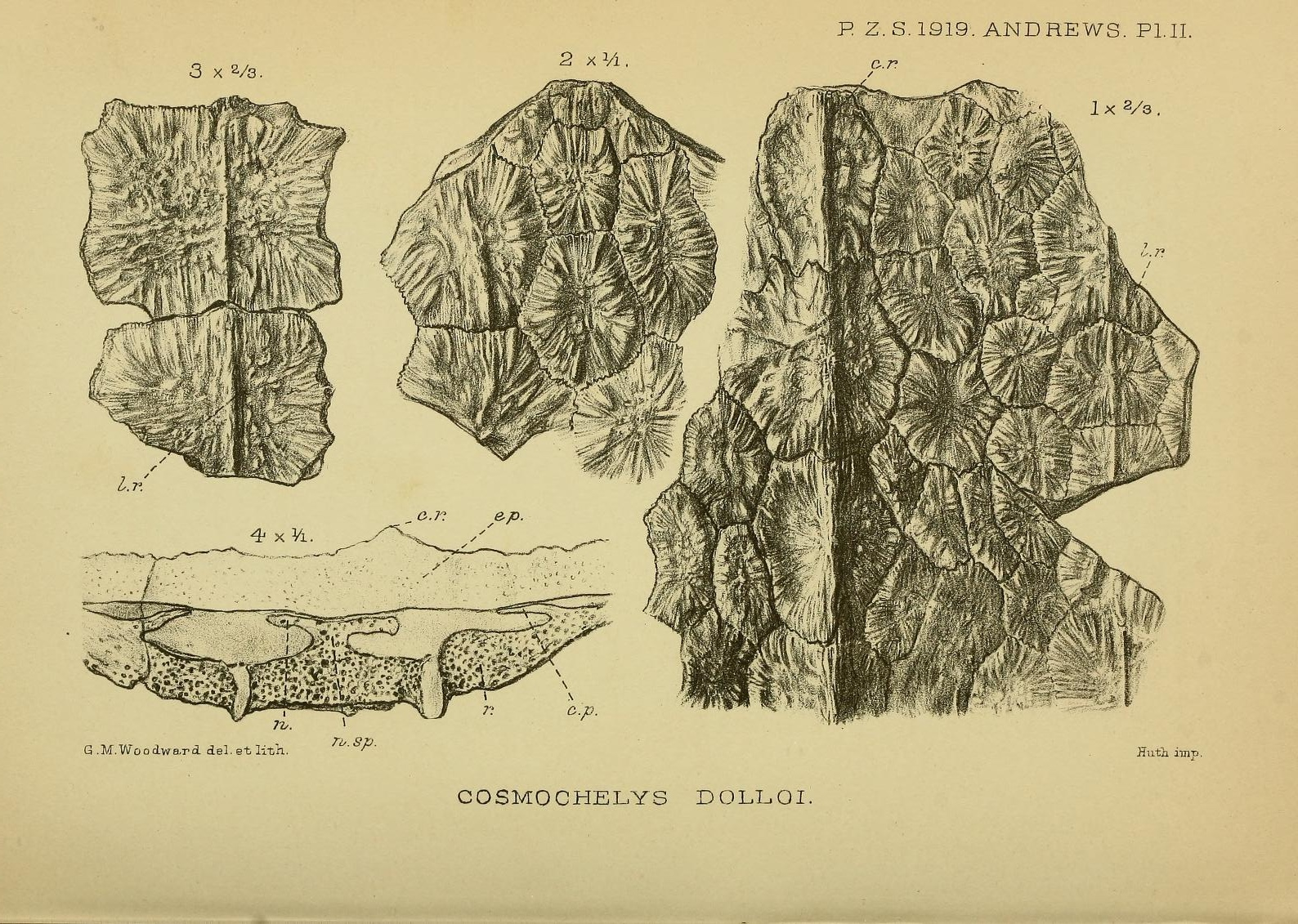
- Type specimen

Scientific classification
- Kingdom: Animalia
- Phylum: Chordata
- Class: Reptilia
- Order: Testudines
- Suborder: Cryptodira
- Family: Dermochelyidae
- Subfamily: Dermochelyinae
- Genus: †Cosmochelys; C. W. Andrews, 1920

Type species
- Cosmochelys dolloi C. W. Andrews, 1920

= Cosmochelys =

Cosmochelys Temporal range: Eocene

Extinct genus of turtles

Cosmochelys is an extinct genus of sea turtle from the Eocene of Africa. It was first named by Andrews in 1919, and contains one species, C. dolloi, named after Louis Dollo. Its type specimen, from near Ameke in Nigeria, is registered in the collections of the Natural History Museum, London, with number NHMUK PV R 4338.
