= Ophisaurus manchenioi =

Ophisaurus manchenioi Temporal range: Calabrian

Scientific classification
- Domain: Eukaryota
- Kingdom: Animalia
- Phylum: Chordata
- Class: Reptilia
- Order: Squamata
- Family: Anguidae
- Genus: Ophisaurus
- Species: †O. manchenioi

Binomial name
- †Ophisaurus manchenioi Blain & Bailon, 2019

Extinct species of reptile

Ophisaurus manchenioi is an extinct species of Ophisaurus that lived during the Calabrian stage of the Pleistocene epoch.

== Distribution ==
Ophisaurus manchenioi is known from Sierra de Quibas in Murcia, Spain.
