= Paraxenophis =

Paraxenophis Temporal range: Neogene

Scientific classification
- Kingdom: Animalia
- Phylum: Chordata
- Class: Reptilia
- Order: Squamata
- Suborder: Serpentes
- Family: Colubridae
- Genus: †Paraxenophis
- Species: †P. spanios

Binomial name
- †Paraxenophis spanios Georgalis et al., 2019

Extinct genus of colubrid

Paraxenophis is an extinct genus of colubrid that inhabited Greece during the Neogene period. It contains a single species, P. spanios.
