= Palaeoxanta =

Palaeoxanta Temporal range: Aptian–Albian

Scientific classification
- Domain: Eukaryota
- Kingdom: Animalia
- Phylum: Chordata
- Class: Reptilia
- Order: Squamata
- Family: †Eoxantidae
- Genus: †Palaeoxanta
- Species: †P. conicodentata

Binomial name
- †Palaeoxanta conicodentata Alifanov, 2019

Extinct lizard genus

Palaeoxanta is an extinct genus of eoxantid that lived during the Early Cretaceous epoch.

== Distribution ==
Palaeoxanta conicodentata is known from the Hühteeg Horizon of Mongolia.
