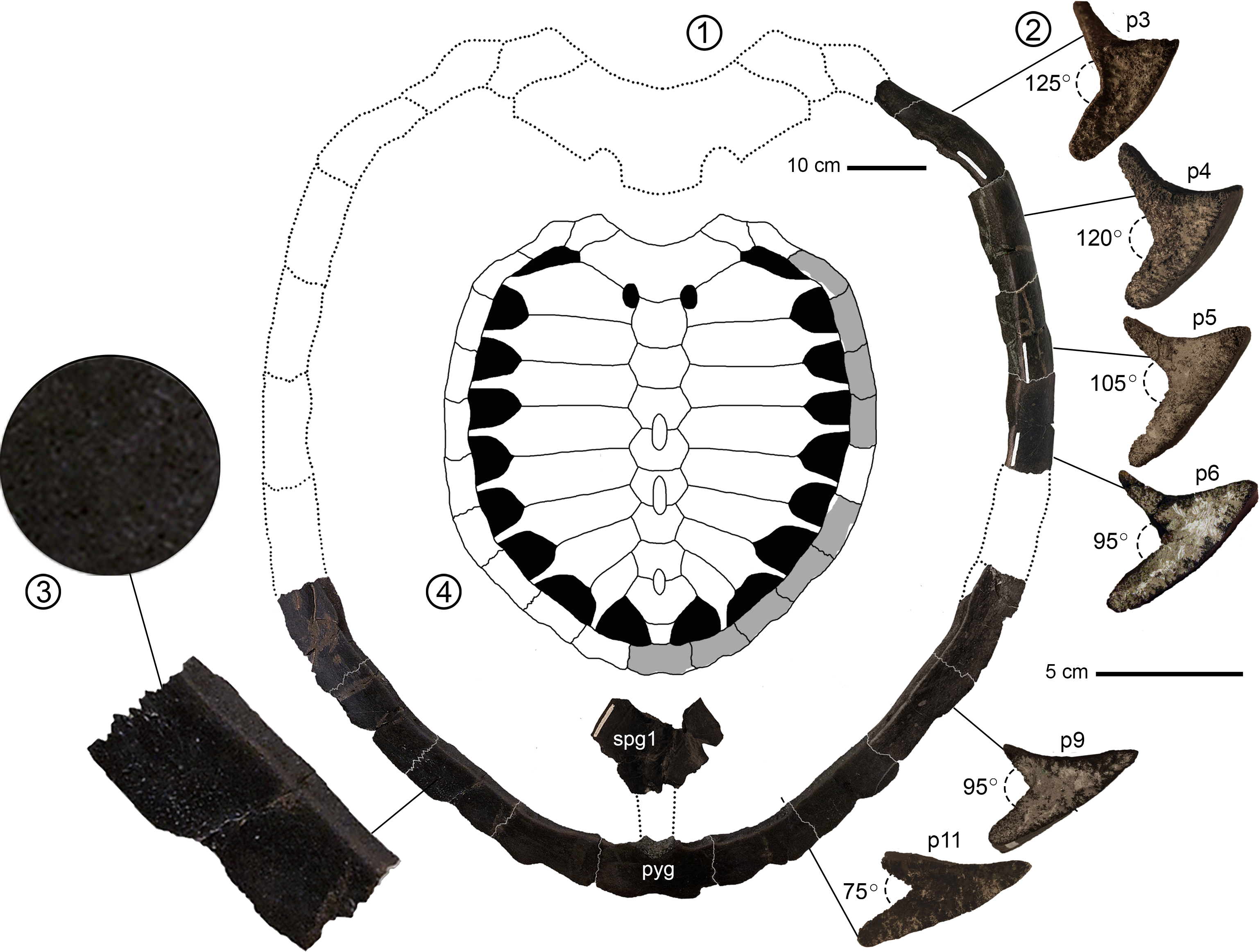
- P. martini holotype carapace

Scientific classification
- Kingdom: Animalia
- Phylum: Chordata
- Class: Reptilia
- Order: Testudines
- Suborder: Cryptodira
- Family: †Ctenochelyidae
- Genus: †Peritresius; Baird, 1964

Type species
- †Chelone ornata Leidy, 1856

Species
- †P. ornatus (Leidy, 1856); †P. martini Gentry et al., 2018

= Peritresius =

Peritresius Temporal range: Campanian–Maastrichtian

Extinct genus of turtles

Peritresius is an extinct genus of sea turtle from the Late Cretaceous deposits in the US Eastern Seaboard.

== Taxonomy ==
Two species are known, Peritresius ornatus (Leidy, 1856) and P. martini Gentry, Parham, Ehret, and Ebersole, 2018, both from Campanian-Maastrichtian age deposits in New Jersey, Alabama, and Mississippi.

== Phylogeny ==
Below is a cladogram from the analysis of Gentry, Ebersole & Kiernan, 2019:

- Pan-Chelonioidea
  - †Angolachelonia
  - - †Protostegidae
    - - †Toxochelys latiremis
      - - Chelonioidea
        - †Ctenochelyidae
          - †Asmodochelys parhami
          - - †Prionochelys matutina
            - †Ctenochelys acris
            - †Ctenochelys stenoporus
            - †Peritresius ornatus
            - †Peritresius martini
