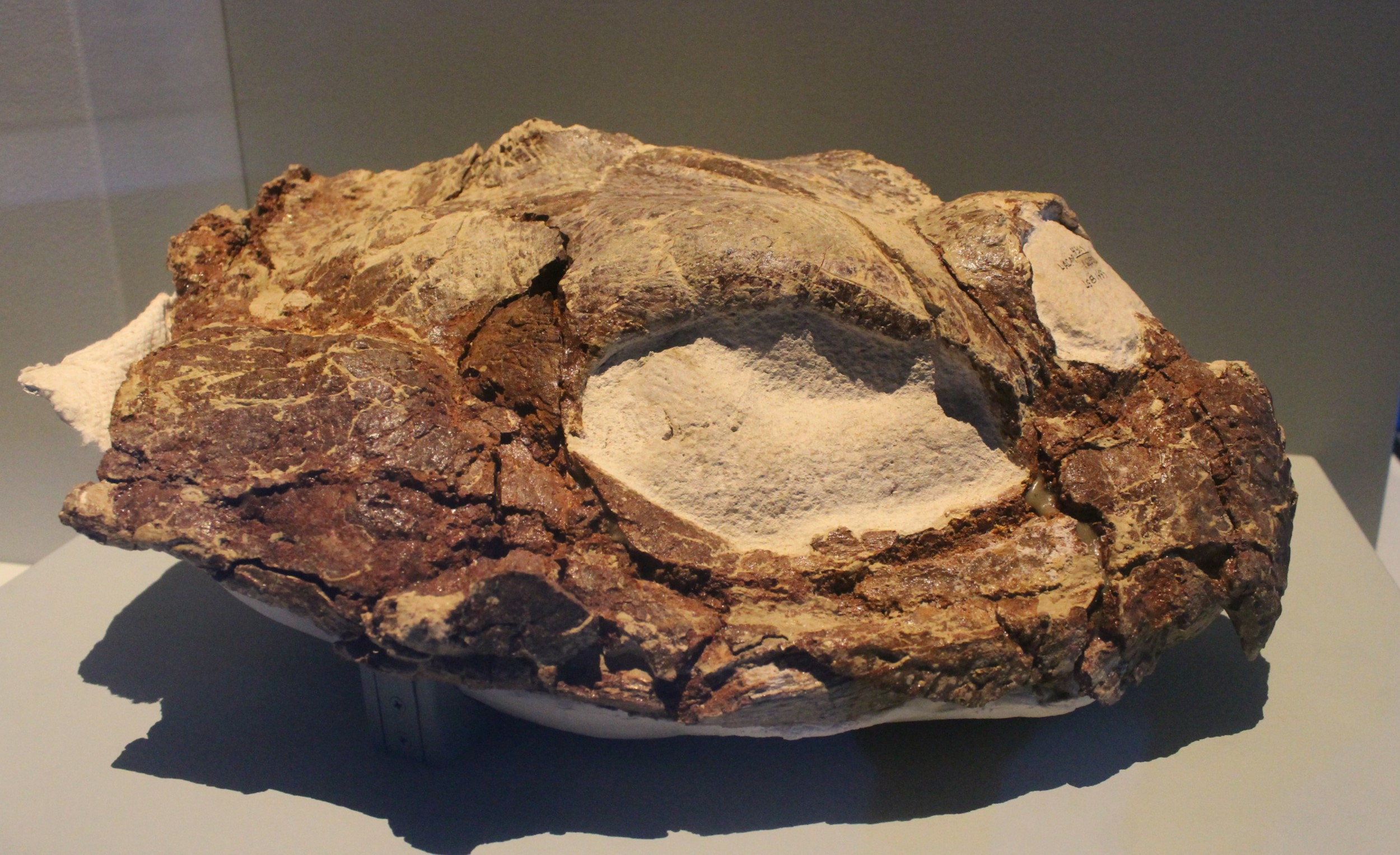
- Skull (LACM 162552) of Psephophorus sp. at the Natural History Museum of Los Angeles County

Scientific classification
- Kingdom: Animalia
- Phylum: Chordata
- Class: Reptilia
- Order: Testudines
- Suborder: Cryptodira
- Family: Dermochelyidae
- Genus: †Psephophorus von Meyer, 1847

Type species
- †P. polygonus

Species
- †P. polygonus; †P. calvertensis; †P. eocaenus; †P. oregonesis; †P. californiensis; †P. terrypratchetti; †P. rupeliensis; †P. scaldii

= Psephophorus =

Psephophorus Temporal range: Oligocene-Pliocene

Extinct genus of turtles

Psephophorus is an extinct genus of sea turtle that lived from the Oligocene to the Pliocene. Its remains have been found in Europe, Africa, North America, and New Zealand. It was first named by Hermann von Meyer in 1847, and contains eight species, P. polygonus, P. calvertensis, P. eocaenus, P. oregonesis, P. californiensis, P. rupeliensis, P. scaldii, and P. terrypratchetti.

Psephophorus is the only Miocene dermochelyid turtle found in Europe. One species of Psephophorus could measure up to ten feet in length.

== Discovery and identification ==
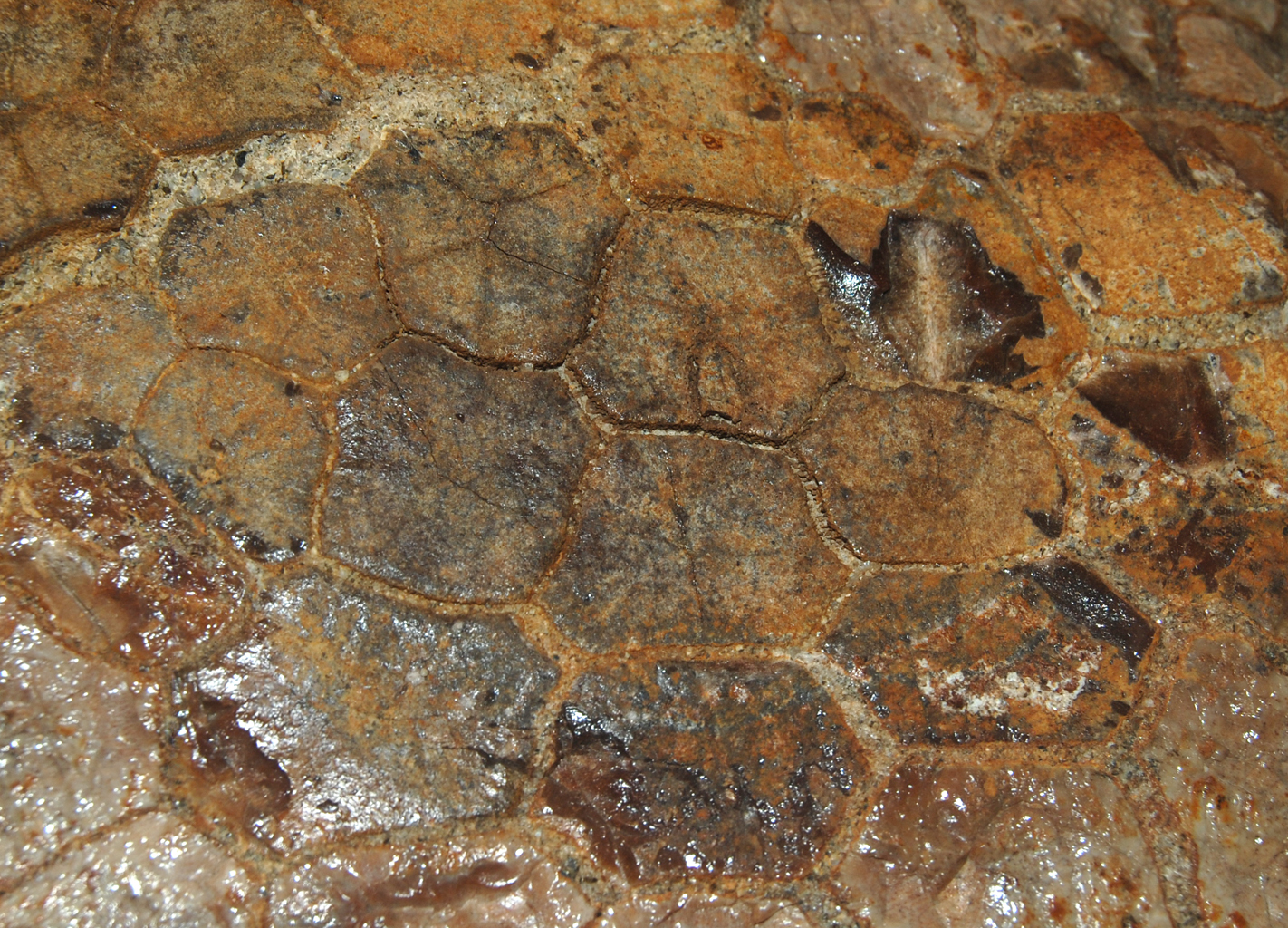
Shell

Von Meyer originally named Psephophorus in 1846. At first he was unable to identify the creature beyond its dermal plates, but when he later received a drawing he was able to describe the specimen, which was then in Pressburg, as a fragment of a carapace, which contained seventy bones.

In 1879, H. G. Seeley was asked to study the Psephophorus specimen by Franz Ritter von Hauer, the Director of the Austro-Hungarian Imperial and Royal Geological Survey. Up until then, the specimen's identity had been undeterminable, with even Seeley describing it at first to seem like "the dermal covering of an Edentate closely allied to the Armadilloes." Seeley examined some bone fragments and concluded the specimen was that of a reptilian creature, furthermore a chelonid. It also proved to be more closely related to Sphargis than any other type in the Chelonian order.

== Relation to modern leatherback sea turtles ==
For a long time, modern leatherback sea turtles (Dermochelys) were believed to be descended directly from Psephophorus, specifically the species P. polygonus. However, a 1996 analysis by Wood et al. proved that most of the taxa in the two genera were not connected, meaning Psephophorus could not be a direct ancestor of the modern leatherbacks. The platelets on Psephophorus are quite similar to those on Dermochelys, despite differences in outer morphology and size. The platelet comprises an external compact layer and an internal zone of cancellous bone.

== Species ==
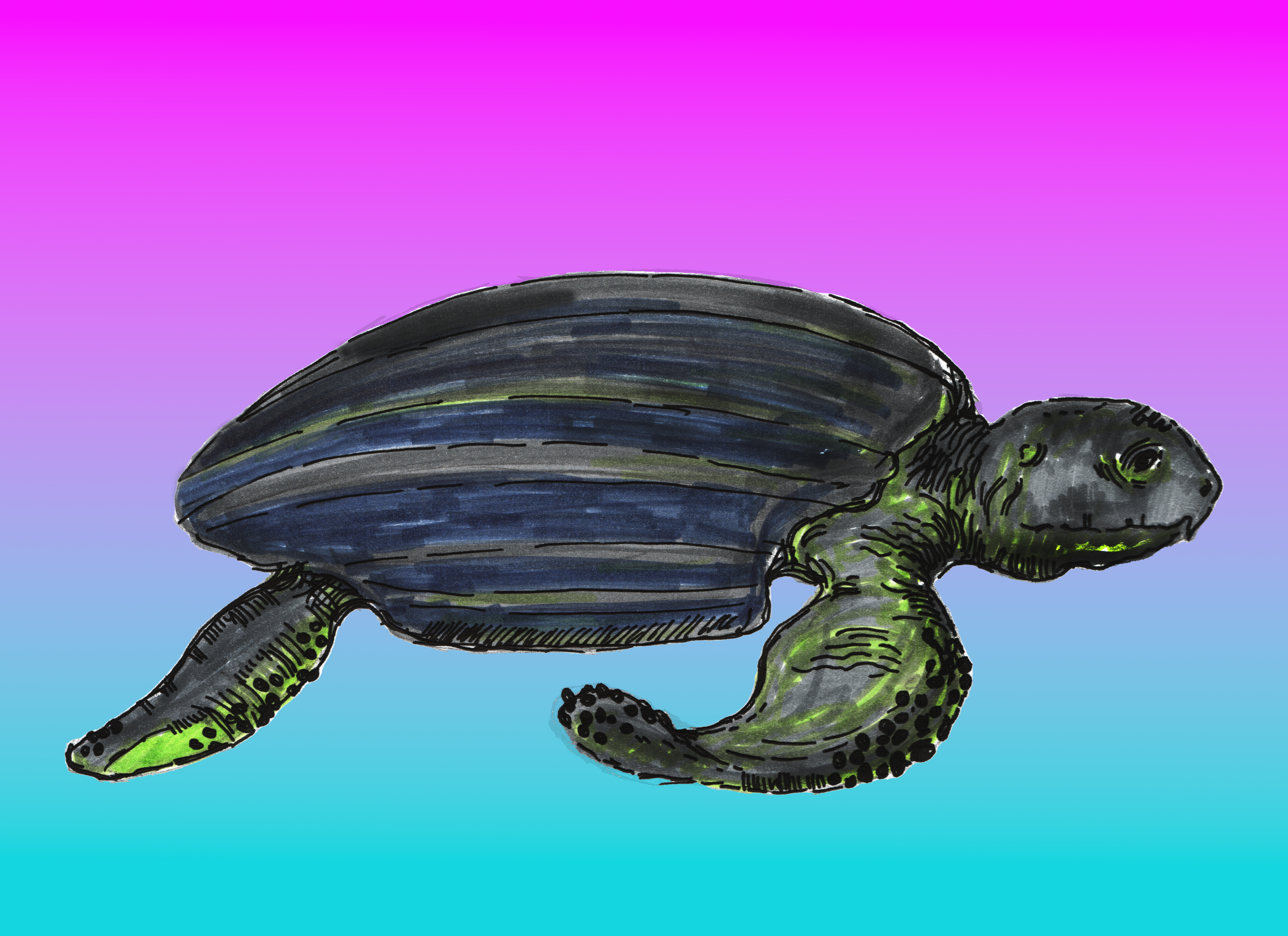
Restoration of Psephophorus californiensis based on morphological descriptions

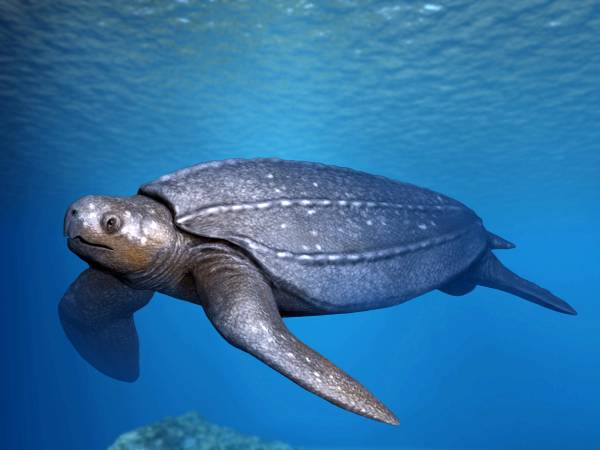
Hypothetical reconstruction of Psephophorus terrypratchetti

- Psephophorus polygonus is the type species, and was discovered by von Meyer in 1846. Fossils of the species have shown bony, carapacial ridges, adjacent, small and polygonal bony ossicles which measure about 22 × 25 mm. When the ossicles extend further along the longitudinal axis, their size increases up to an average of 33 × 41 mm.
- Psephophorus calvertensis was first named by Palmer in 1909. It was so named for being found in the Calvert Formation. P. calvertensis is a rarely found specimen.
- Psephophorus eocaenus was first named by Andrews in 1901.
- Psephophorus californiensis was first named by Gilmore in 1937.
- Psephophorus terrypratchetti was discovered in the 1990s by Richard Köhler in New Zealand and named in 1995 after the author Terry Pratchett, who wrote a series of fantasy books set on a world carried on the back of a giant turtle. This species reached 2.3–2.5 m (7.5–8.2 ft) in body length which is more than 80% bigger than P. eocaenus.

== See also ==
- List of organisms named after famous people (born 1925–1949)
- Archelon
- Gigantatypus
- Largest prehistoric animals
