= Periergophis =

Periergophis Temporal range: Neogene

Scientific classification
- Kingdom: Animalia
- Phylum: Chordata
- Class: Reptilia
- Order: Squamata
- Suborder: Serpentes
- Family: Colubridae
- Genus: †Periergophis
- Species: †P. micros

Binomial name
- †Periergophis micros Georgalis et al., 2019

Extinct genus of colubrid

Periergophis is an extinct genus of colubrid that inhabited Greece during the Neogene period. It contains a single species, P. micros.
