= Chalcides augei =

Chalcides augei Temporal range: Middle Miocene

Scientific classification
- Kingdom: Animalia
- Phylum: Chordata
- Class: Reptilia
- Order: Squamata
- Family: Scincidae
- Genus: Chalcides
- Species: C. augei

Binomial name
- Chalcides augei Čerňanský et al., 2020

Extinct species of reptile

Chalcides augei is an extinct species of Chalcides that lived during the Middle Miocene.

== Distribution ==
Chalcides augei was found at the fossil site of Tagay near Lake Baikal.
