= Paradorsetisaurus =

Paradorsetisaurus Temporal range: Early Cretaceous

Scientific classification
- Domain: Eukaryota
- Kingdom: Animalia
- Phylum: Chordata
- Class: Reptilia
- Order: Squamata
- Family: †Dorsetisauridae
- Genus: †Paradorsetisaurus
- Species: †P. postumus

Binomial name
- †Paradorsetisaurus postumus Alifanov, 2019

Extinct genus of lizards

Paradorsetisaurus is an extinct genus of dorsetisaurid lizards that inhabited Mongolia during the Early Cretaceous epoch. It contains a single species, P. postumus.
