= Corsochelys =

Corsochelys Temporal range: Late Cretaceous

Scientific classification
- Kingdom: Animalia
- Phylum: Chordata
- Class: Reptilia
- Order: Testudines
- Suborder: Cryptodira
- Family: Dermochelyidae
- Genus: †Corsochelys; Zangerl, 1960

Type species
- †C. halinches

Extinct genus of sea turtle

Corsochelys is an extinct genus of sea turtle that lived in the Late Cretaceous (Campanian). Zangerl (1960) named the type species (and currently only species; C. haliniches), based upon remains found in Alabama within the Mooreville Chalk Formation (the lower part of the Selma Group).

== Description ==
Corsochelys is a basal dermochelyid. As with other basal chelonioids (such as Santanachelys and Toxochelys), Corsochelys possesses a large foramen interorbitale with a narrow processus inferior parietalis, which indicates that the genus possessed salt-excreting lachrymal glands. In addition to its similarly to these genera, Corsochelys retains a carapace with minimally reduced coastal plates. Like the larger Archelon, Corsochelys had channels penetrating the subphyseal plate from bone into the cartilage above, much like the living leatherback turtle. This means that Corsochelys would have reached their large size quickly through fast skeletal growth, as with the leatherback.

Recently, a dermochelyid that closely resembles Corsochelys was found in the Maastrichtian deposits of the Ouled Abdoun phosphate basin, Morocco.

== Suggested further reading ==
- The Biology of Sea Turtles by Peter L. Lutz and John A. Musick
- Biology of Turtles by Jeanette Wyneken, Matthew H. Godfrey, and Vincent Bels
