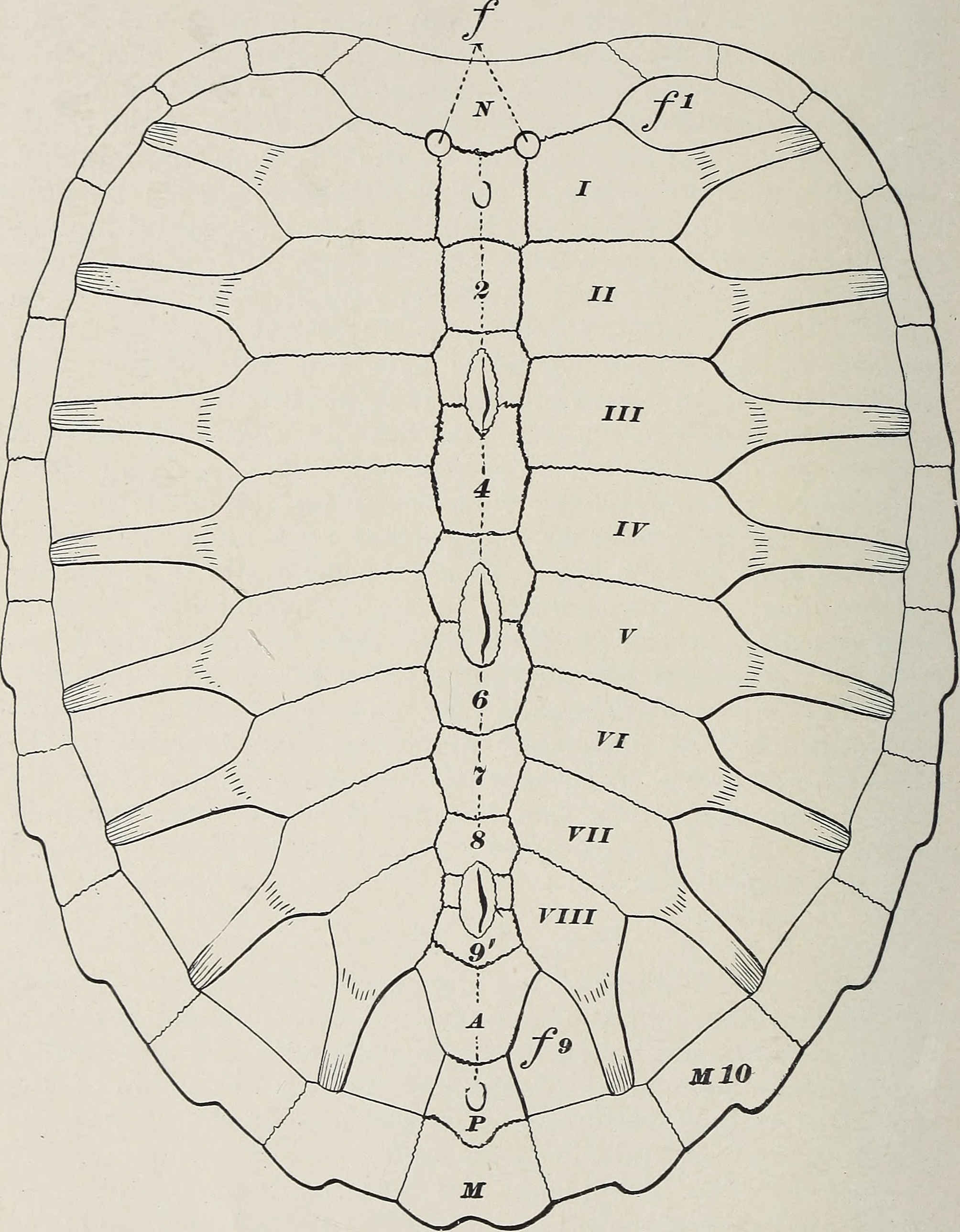
- Diagram of Ctenochelys stenoporus

Scientific classification
- Kingdom: Animalia
- Phylum: Chordata
- Class: Reptilia
- Order: Testudines
- Suborder: Cryptodira
- Superfamily: Chelonioidea
- Family: †Ctenochelyidae; Karl, Biermann & Tichy, 2012 (sensu Gentry, 2018)

Type genus
- †Ctenochelys Zangerl, 1953

Genera
- †Asmodochelys; †Ctenochelys; †Peritresius; †Prionochelys

= Ctenochelyidae =

Ctenochelyids Temporal range: Late Cretaceous, Santonian–Maastrichtian

Extinct family of sea turtles

Ctenochelyidae is an extinct family of sea turtles which lived in North America during the Santonian-Maastrichtian stages of the Late Cretaceous.

== Classification ==
The family is defined as a monophyletic clade arising from the most recent ancestors of Ctenochelys and Peritresius. Fossils of ctenochelyids are known from the Western Interior Seaway and Mississippi embayment. As of 2025, four genera have been assigned to this family: Asmodochelys, Ctenochelys, Peritresius and Prionochelys.

Below is a cladogram from the analysis by Gentry, Ebersole & Kiernan (2019):

- Pan-Chelonioidea
  - †Angolachelonia
  - - †Protostegidae
    - - †Toxochelys latiremis
      - - Chelonioidea
        - †Ctenochelyidae
          - †Asmodochelys parhami
          - - †Prionochelys matutina
            - †Ctenochelys acris
            - †Ctenochelys stenoporus
            - †Peritresius ornatus
            - †Peritresius martini
