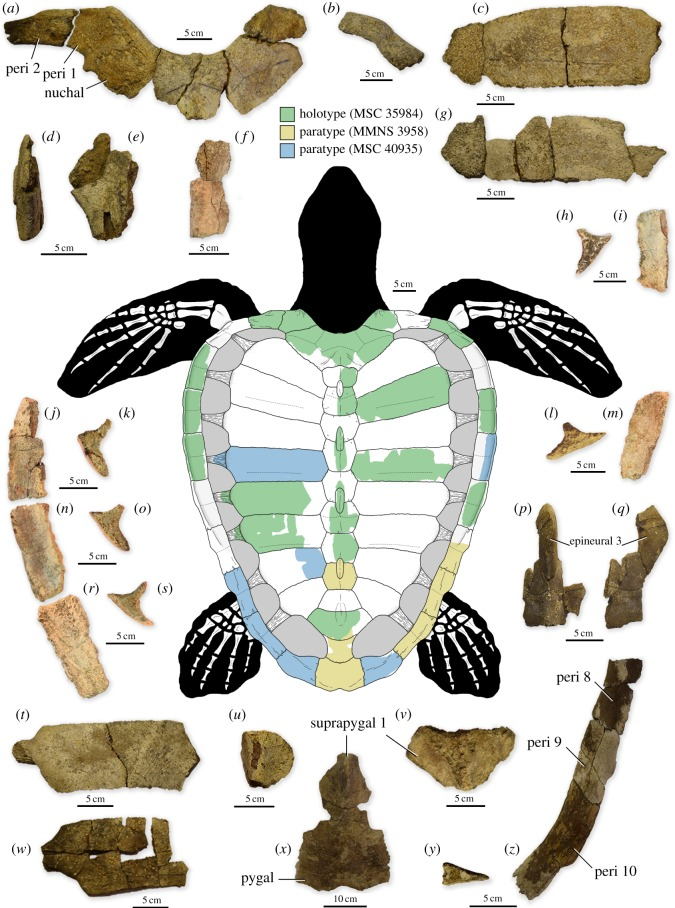
- A. parhami
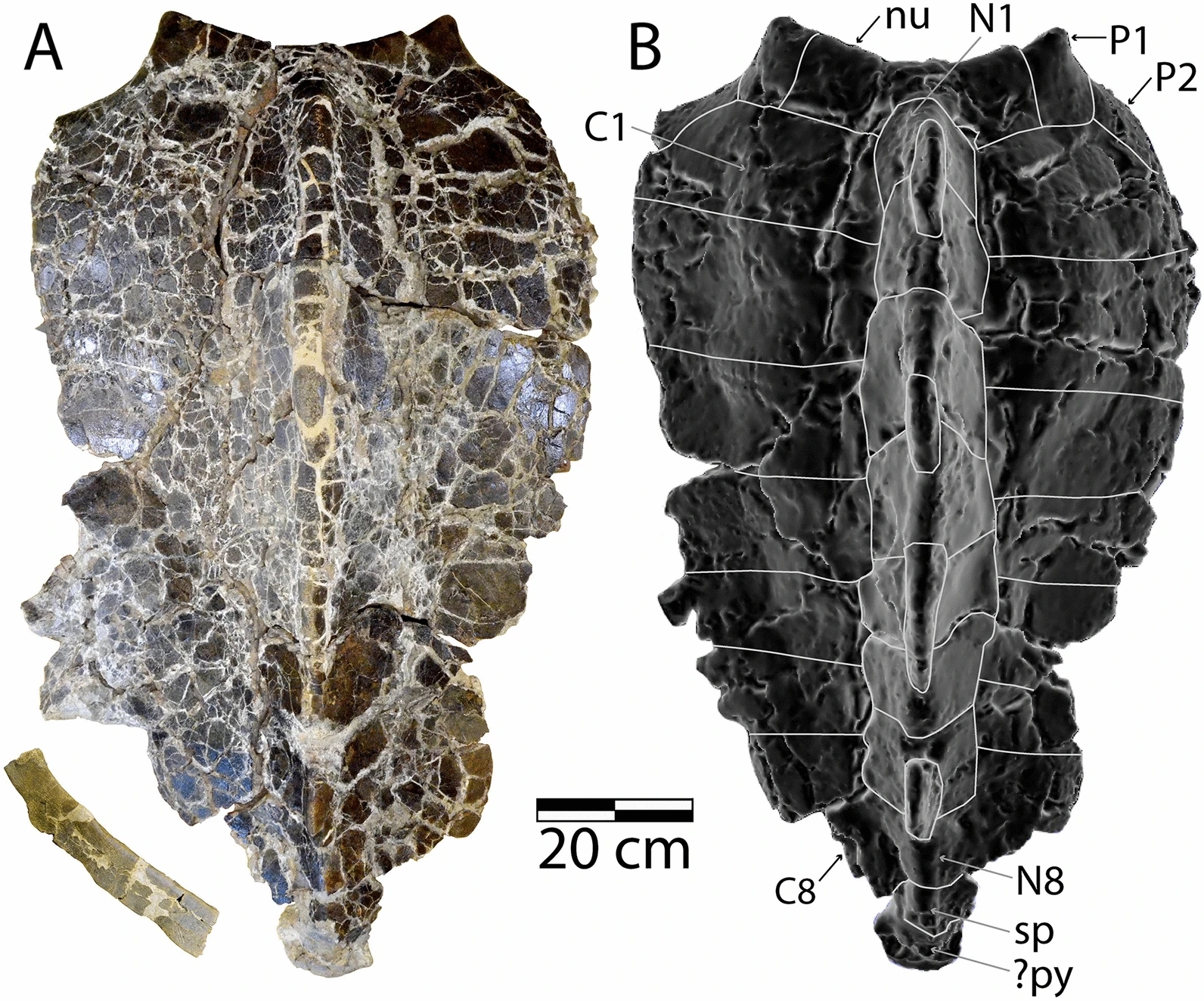
- A. leviathan

Scientific classification
- Kingdom: Animalia
- Phylum: Chordata
- Class: Reptilia
- Order: Testudines
- Suborder: Cryptodira
- Family: †Ctenochelyidae
- Genus: †Asmodochelys; Gentry, Ebersole & Kiernan, 2019

Type species
- †Asmodochelys parhami Gentry, Ebersole & Kiernan, 2019

Other species
- †A. leviathan Smith, Adrian & Kline, 2025

= Asmodochelys =

Asmodochelys Temporal range: Late Cretaceous, upper Campanian–lower Maastrichtian

Extinct genus of turtle

Asmodochelys is an extinct genus of sea turtle which lived in North America during the Late Cretaceous (Campanian-Maastrichtian). Two species are known from the southern United States: A. parhami from the Demopolis Chalk and A. leviathan from the Neylandville Marl.
