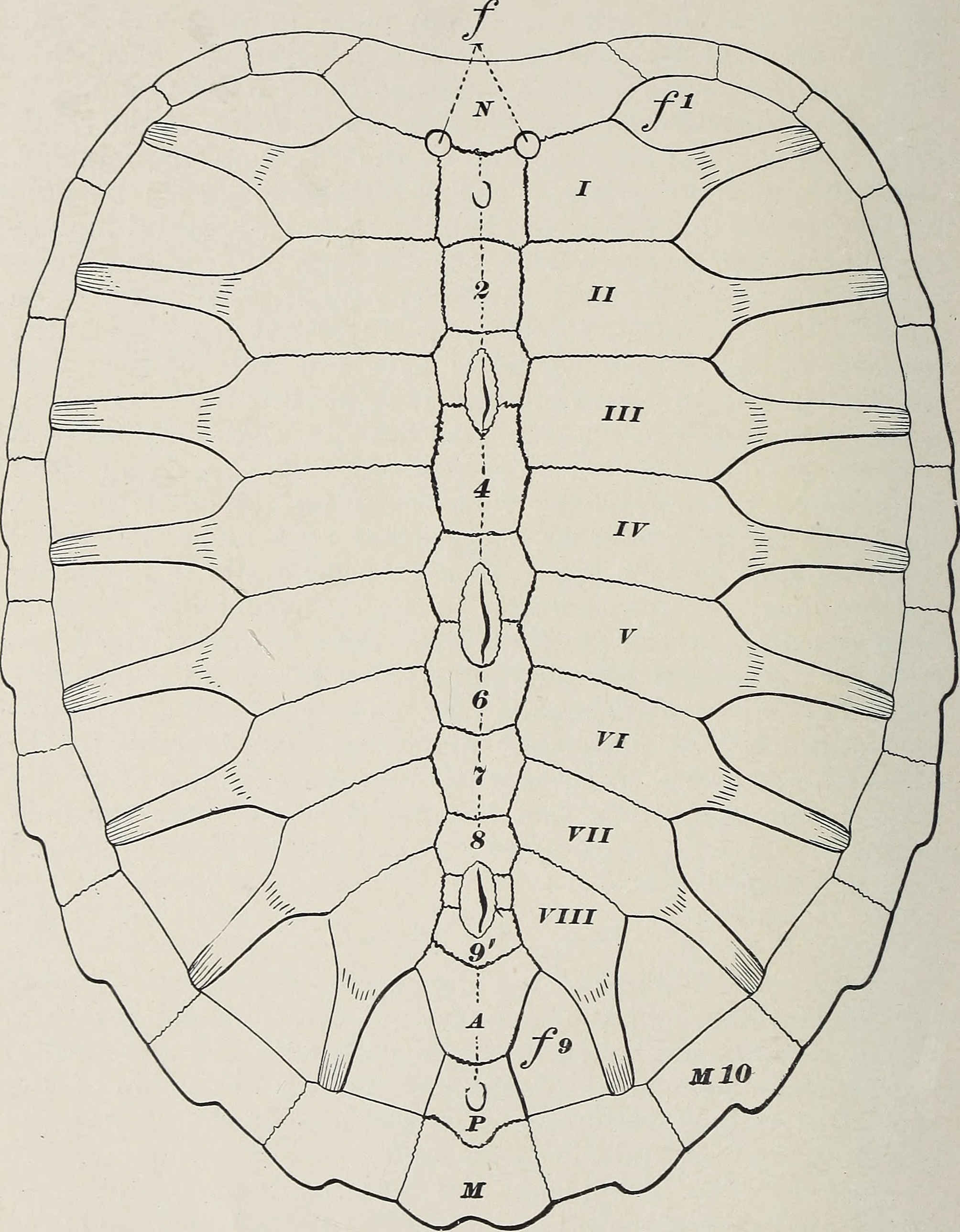
- Ctenochelys stenoporus

Scientific classification
- Kingdom: Animalia
- Phylum: Chordata
- Class: Reptilia
- Order: Testudines
- Suborder: Cryptodira
- Family: †Ctenochelyidae
- Genus: †Ctenochelys; Zangerl, 1953

Type species
- †Ctenochelys stenoporus

Species
- †C. stenoporus; †C. acris

= Ctenochelys =

Ctenochelys Temporal range: Late Cretaceous, 89–70 Ma

Extinct genus of sea turtles

Ctenochelys (meaning "comb tortoise") is an extinct genus of marine turtle (Cryptodira, Ctenochelyidae), which existed during the Cretaceous period, and lived in the shallow waters of the Western Interior Seaway. Its fossils have been found in the Ripley Formation and Mooreville Chalk of central Alabama, United States. It was first named by C. H. Sternberg in 1904, and contains two species, C. stenoporus and C. acris.

== Species ==
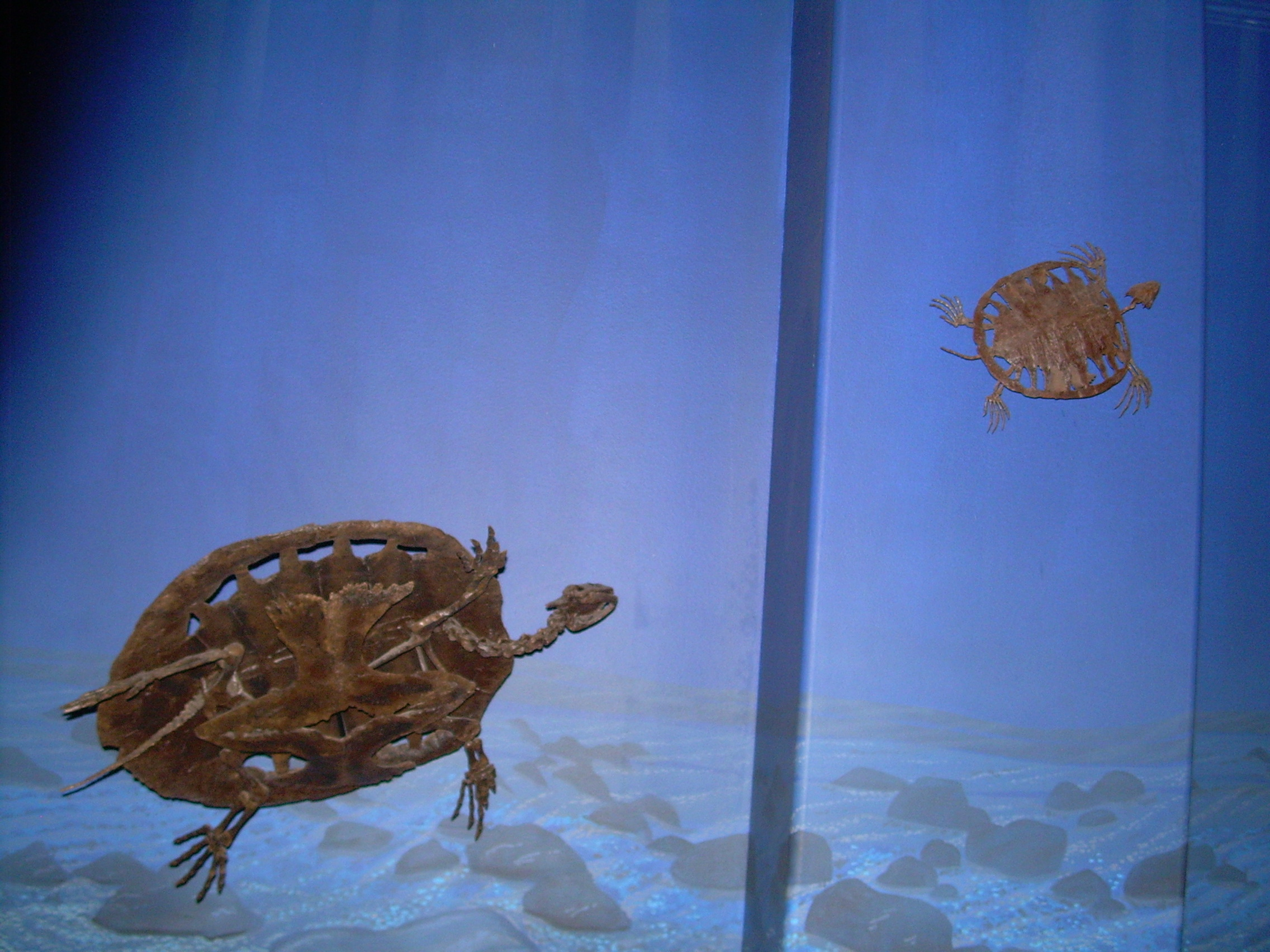
Ctenochelys stenoporus skeletons

Ctenochelys stenoporus is the type species. It was originally thought to be a species of Toxochelys; T. bauri, until Sternberg declared it a separate genus. The two genera are similar in carapaces.

Ctenochelys acris was first named by Zangerl in 1953 and is now thought to be one of the earliest ancestors of modern cheloniids.

== Phylogeny ==
Ctenochelys in a cladogram from the analysis of Gentry et al., 2019:

- Pan-Chelonioidea
  - †Angolachelonia
  - - †Protostegidae
    - - †Toxochelys latiremis
      - - Chelonioidea
        - †Ctenochelyidae
          - †Asmodochelys parhami
          - - †Prionochelys matutina
            - †Ctenochelys acris
            - †Ctenochelys stenoporus
            - †Peritresius ornatus
            - †Peritresius martini
