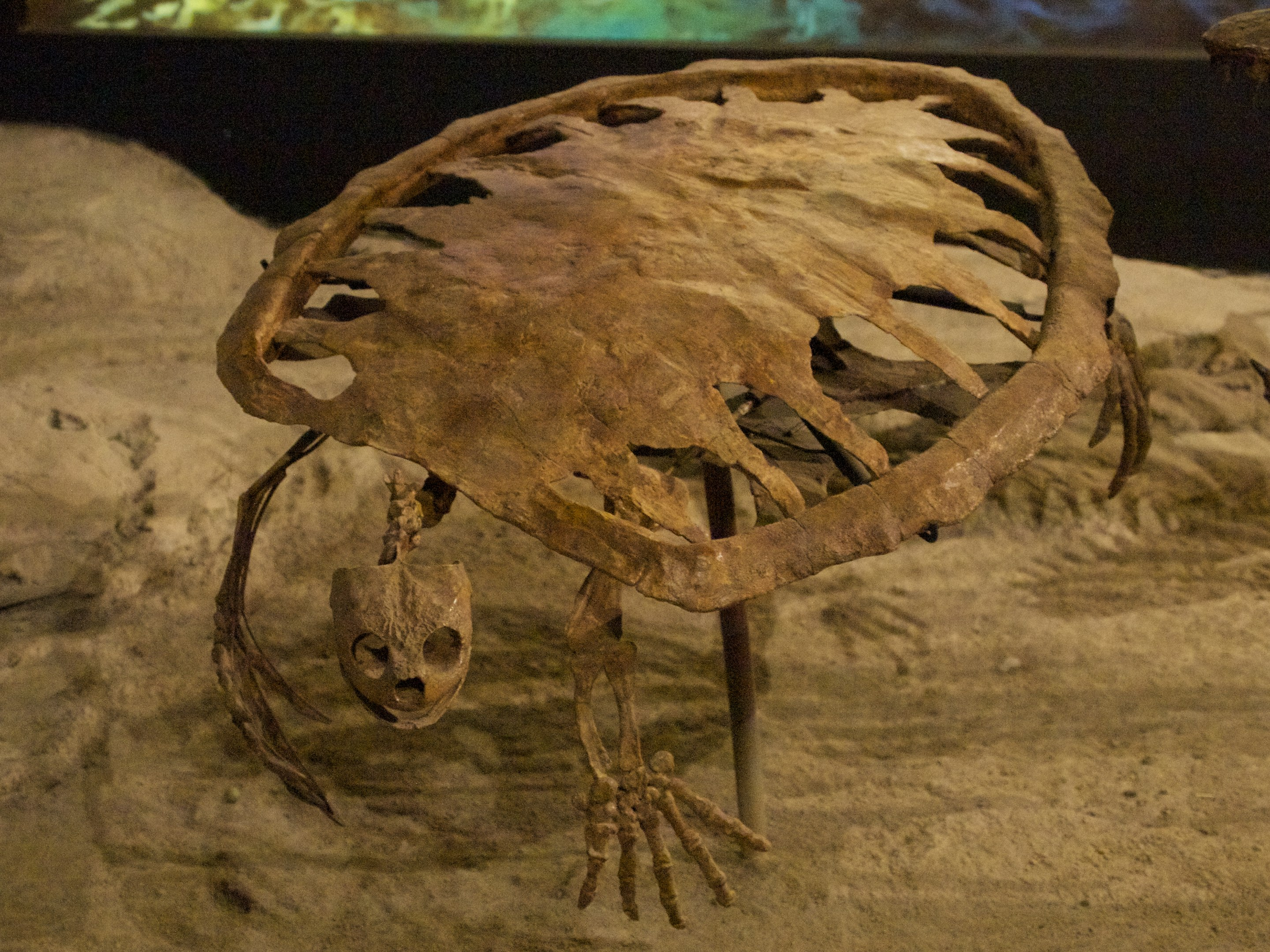
- Fossil specimen, Houston Museum of Natural Science

Scientific classification
- Kingdom: Animalia
- Phylum: Chordata
- Class: Reptilia
- Order: Testudines
- Suborder: Cryptodira
- Clade: Panchelonioidea
- Family: †Toxochelyidae; Baur, 1895
- Genus: †Toxochelys; Cope, 1873

Species
- T. latiremis Cope, 1873 (type); T. moorevillensis Zangerl, 1953

= Toxochelys =

Toxochelys Temporal range: Coniacian to Maastrichtian 89–66 Ma

Extinct genus of turtles

Toxochelys (/tɒksəˈkɛliːz, tɒksoʊ-, -lɪs/) is an extinct genus of marine turtle from the Late Cretaceous period. It is the most commonly found fossilized turtle species in the Smoky Hill Chalk, in western Kansas.

== Description ==
Toxochelys had carapace about 90 centimetres (3.0 ft) in length. Two species in the genus are recognized, Toxochelys latiremis and Toxochelys moorevillensis. Phylogenetic analysis shows that Toxochelys belong to an extinct lineage of turtles transitional between modern sea turtles and other turtles.

Toxochelys bauri Williston, 1905, based on the skeleton YPM 1786, is a synonym of Ctenochelys stenoporus.

Toxochelys are currently thought to be the oldest member and the last common ancestor of all extinct marine turtles. Even though Toxochelys shared similar limb characteristics with other species as Cheloniidae and Protostegidae, they evolved independently to pass down new limb features to future generations. These features allowed for advanced mobility of the hand.

== Phylogeny ==
Toxochelys latiremis in a cladogram from the analysis of Gentry et al., 2019:

- Pan-Chelonioidea
  - †Angolachelonia
  - - †Protostegidae
    - - †Toxochelys latiremis
      - - Chelonioidea
        - †Ctenochelyidae
