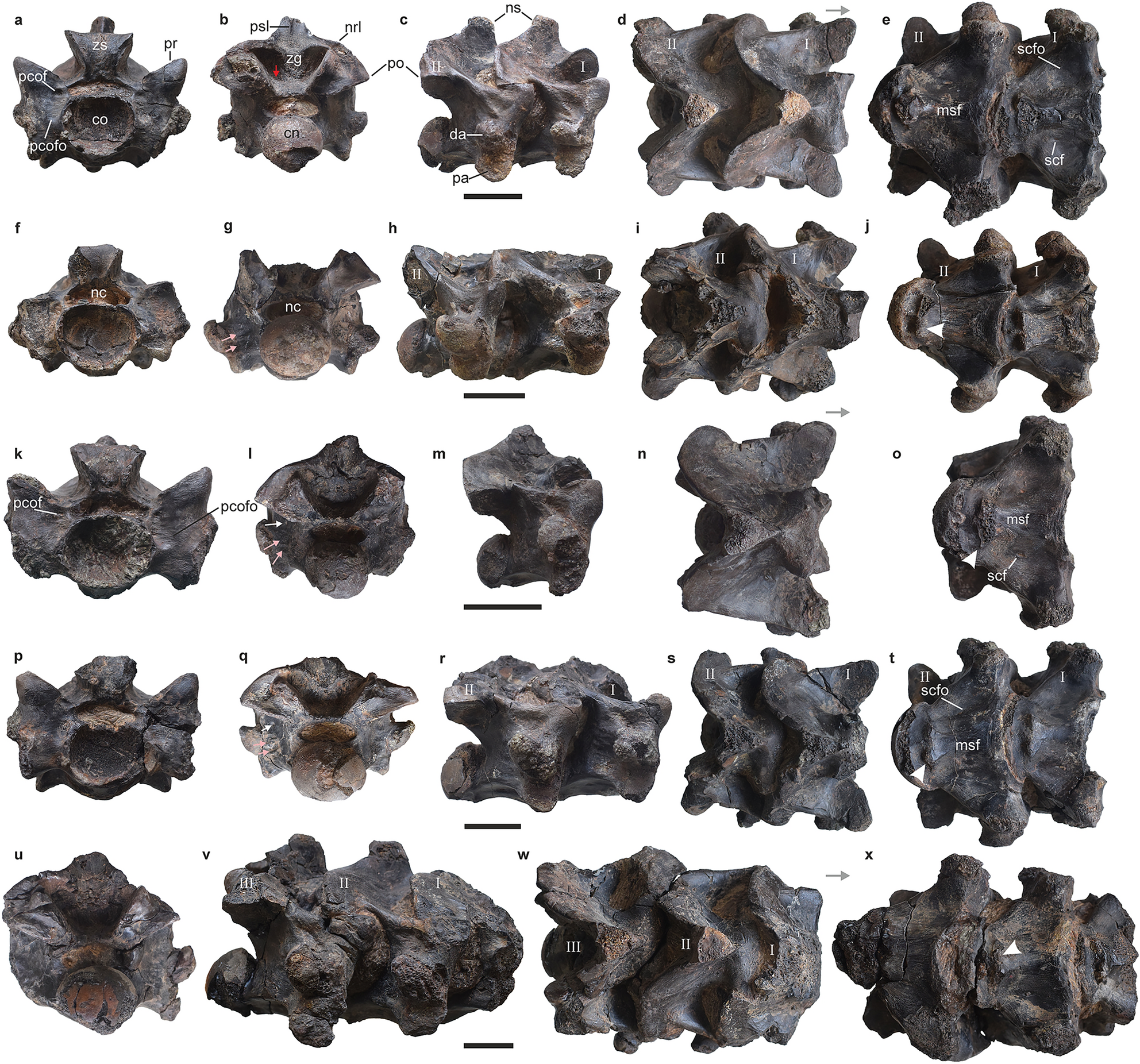
- Select holotype vertebrae of Vasuki

Scientific classification
- Kingdom: Animalia
- Phylum: Chordata
- Class: Reptilia
- Order: Squamata
- Family: †Madtsoiidae
- Genus: †Vasuki
- Species: †V. indicus

Binomial name
- †Vasuki indicus Datta & Bajpai, 2024

= Vasuki indicus =

Vasuki Temporal range: Middle Eocene (Lutetian), ~47 Ma

Extinct species of snake

Vasuki indicus is an extinct snake species in the family Madtsoiidae that lived during the Middle Eocene in India. V. indicus is the only species in the genus Vasuki, known from several vertebrae found in the Naredi Formation. It has an estimated body length between 10.9–15.2 m (36–50 ft), making it the largest known madtsoiid. The highest length estimates place Vasuki among the longest snakes ever discovered.

== Discovery and naming ==
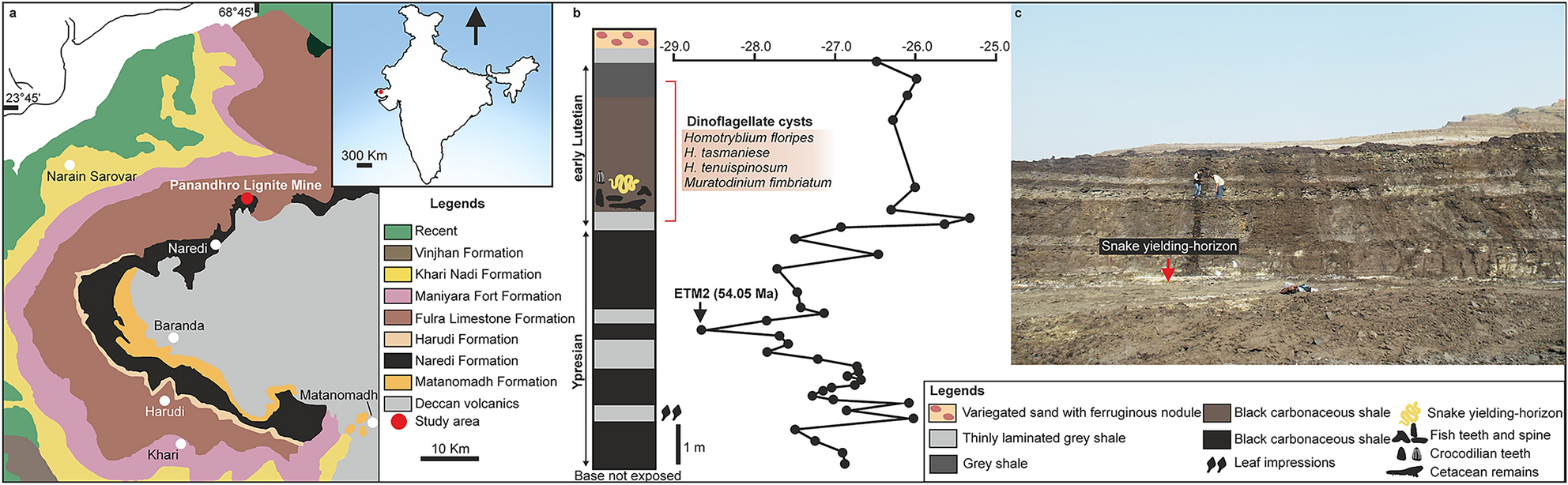
Kutch Basin geology and Vasuki discovery locality

The holotype specimen of Vasuki, IITR/VPL/SB 3102–1–21, was discovered in 2005 within the sedimentary layers of the Naredi Formation in the Panadhro Lignite Mine in the Kutch district of Gujarat State, western India. The specimen consists of 27 pre-cloacal vertebrae, some of which were found in articulation. The fossil material was found some time after 2004, and preliminary analyses suggested crocodilian affinities for the fossil material without further review.

In 2024 Debajit Datta and Sunil Bajpai described Vasuki indicus as a new genus and species of madtsoiid snake based on these fossil remains. The generic name, Vasuki, references the Hindu divine serpent of the same name. The specific name, indicus, references India, the country where the Vasuki fossils were found.

The following year, Datta and Bajpai described IITR/VPL/SB 2782, an isolated vertebra from the mid-trunk region found in the same locality as the Vasuki indicus holotype. While they formally recognized it as an indeterminate genus and species of madtsoiid, they also noted several anatomical characteristics the bone shares with Vasuki. However, multiple characters also distinguish the vertebra from the Vasuki indicus holotype, suggesting it may be a second distinct species in the genus. Alternatively, the differences could be explained by sexual dimorphism within the species.

== Description ==
Size of the largest known snakes compared to a human (Vasuki at top)

The body length estimations of Vasuki are derived from predictive regression equations: one based on postzygapophyseal width, and the other based on prezygapophyseal width. The former equation resulted in a body length range of 10.9–12.2 m (36–40 ft), while the latter equation resulted in a body length range of 14.5–15.2 m (48–50 ft). Although the vertebral dimensions of Vasuki are slightly smaller than those of Titanoboa (estimated at 12.8 m (42 ft) ± 2.2 m (7 ft 3 in)), the upper length estimates indicate a longer body for the former.

== Classification ==
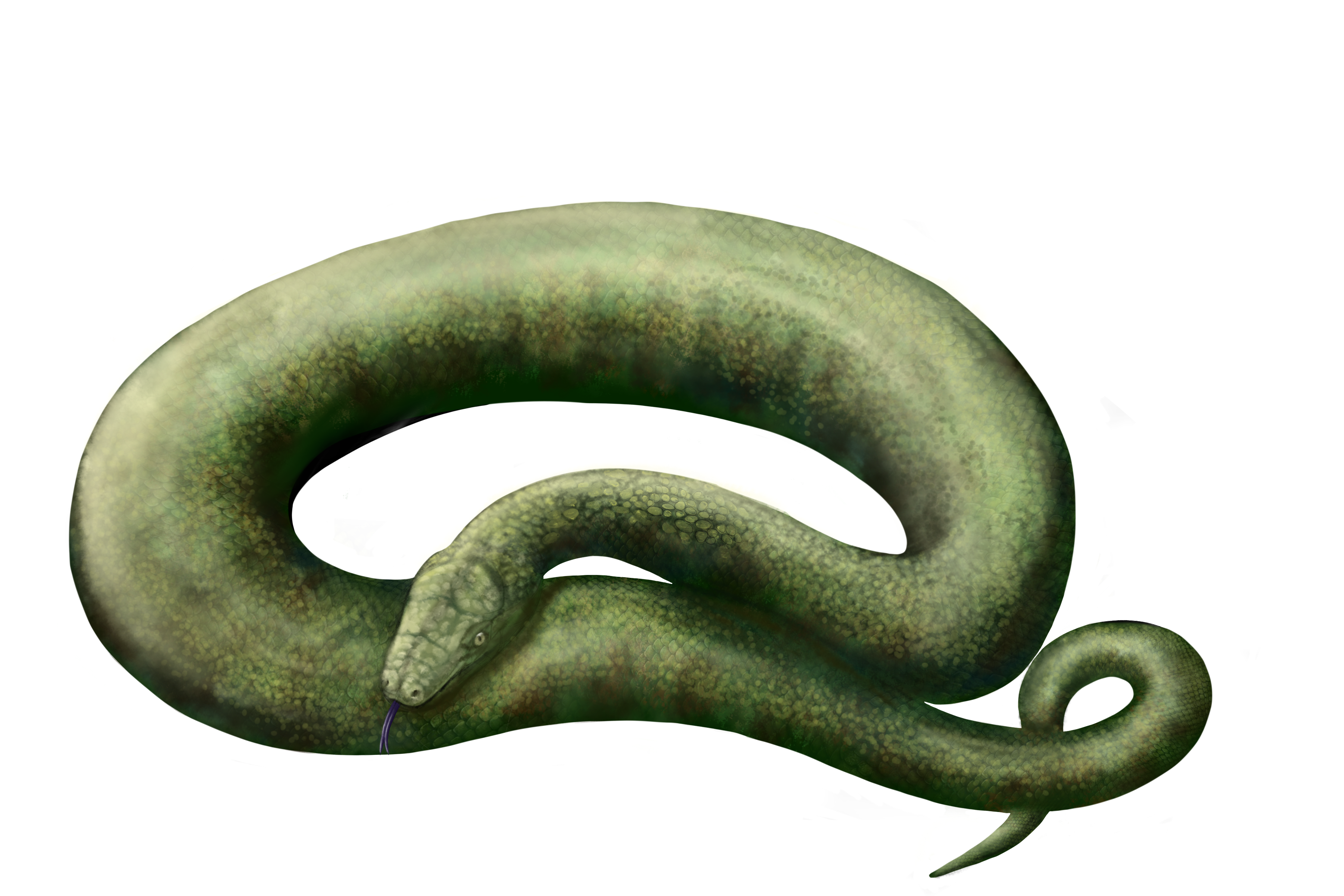
Speculative life reconstruction

In a phylogenetic analyses, Vasuki is recovered as a member of the extinct snake clade Madtsoiidae as the sister taxon to the clade formed by Madtsoia pisdurensis (Late Cretaceous India) and Gigantophis garstini (Late Eocene North Africa). It is a member of a lineage of medium–large bodied madtsoiids, which is in turn the sister taxon to a clade of smaller madtsoiids. The results are displayed in the cladogram below:

- Madtsoiidae
  - - Nanowana godthelpi
    - - Alamitophis elongatus
      - Alamitophis tingamarra
      - Nidophis insularis
      - - Patagoniophis australiensis
        - Nanowana schrenki
  - - Powellophis andina
    - - - Vasuki indicus
        - - Gigantophis garstini
          - Madtsoia pisdurensis
      - - - Gigantophis spp.
          - Madtsoia camposi
        - - - Adinophis fisaka
            - Platyspondylophis tadkeshwarensis
          - - Menarana nosymena
            - - Menarana laurasiae
              - - Madtsoia madagascariensis
                - - Madtsoia bai
                  - - Yurlunggur camfieldensis
                    - Wonambi naracoortensis

== Paleoenvironment ==
Unlike other large-bodied snakes like Titanoboa, Vasuki was probably not an aquatic animal. Its vertebral morphology instead suggests a terrestrial (or possibly semi-aquatic) lifestyle when compared to related madtsoiids and modern pythonoids. The Vasuki fossils were deposited in a backswamp marsh. Large extant pythonids are found in similar habitats.

Vasuki is known from the Naredi Formation, which dates to the Middle Eocene. Fossils of catfish, turtles, crocodilians, and early cetaceans, like Andrewsiphius and Kutchicetus, are also known from this formation, any of which may have been the prey of Vasuki. Other primitive whales that weren't unearthed in the Naredi Formation but lived in the nearby Kutch district during the Eocene include Kharodacetus, Indocetus, Babiacetus, and Dhedacetus. At this time, India was largely isolated from Asia. Fossils of another species of snake, Pterosphenus, have been unearthed in areas near the Naredi Formation. Fossils of primitive sirenians such as Protosiren, Eosiren, and Eotheroides and species of Tomistoma crocodilian have been found in areas near the Naredi Formation.

== See also ==
- Largest prehistoric animals
- Largest and heaviest animals#Reptiles (Reptilia)
- List of largest snakes
