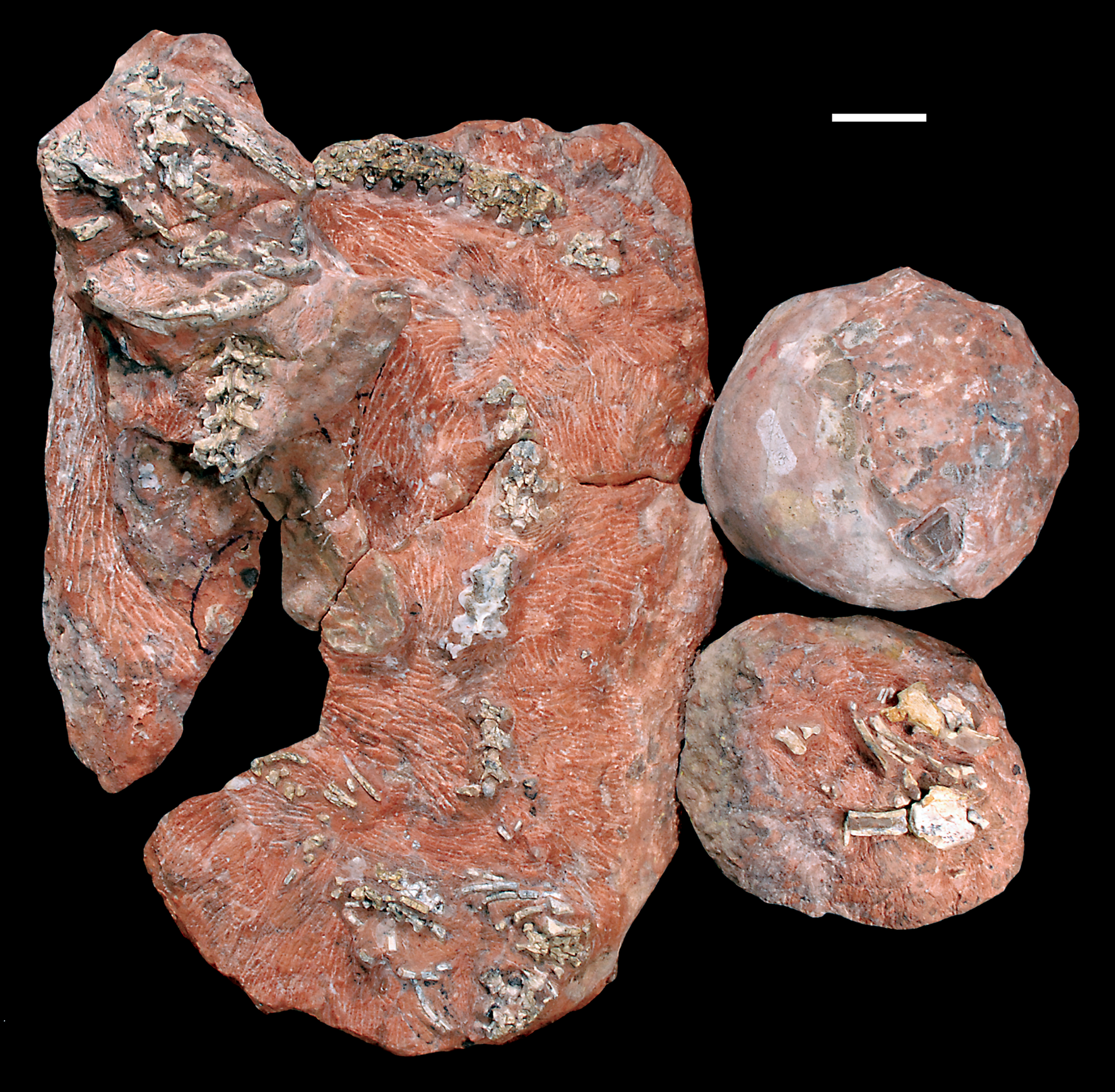
- Blocks preserving fossils of Sanajeh indicus and sauropod hatchlings

Scientific classification
- Kingdom: Animalia
- Phylum: Chordata
- Class: Reptilia
- Order: Squamata
- Family: †Madtsoiidae
- Genus: †Sanajeh; Wilson et al., 2010
- Species: †S. indicus

Binomial name
- †Sanajeh indicus Wilson et al., 2010

= Sanajeh =

Sanajeh Temporal range: Late Cretaceous, 68 Ma

Genus of snakes

Sanajeh (meaning "ancient gape" in Sanskrit) is a genus of madtsoiid snake from the Late Cretaceous of what is now western India. A fossil described in 2010 from the Lameta Formation was found coiled around an egg and an adjacent skeleton of a 50 cm (1.6 ft) long sauropod dinosaur hatchling. This suggests that the snake preyed on hatchling sauropods at nesting sites.

== Description ==
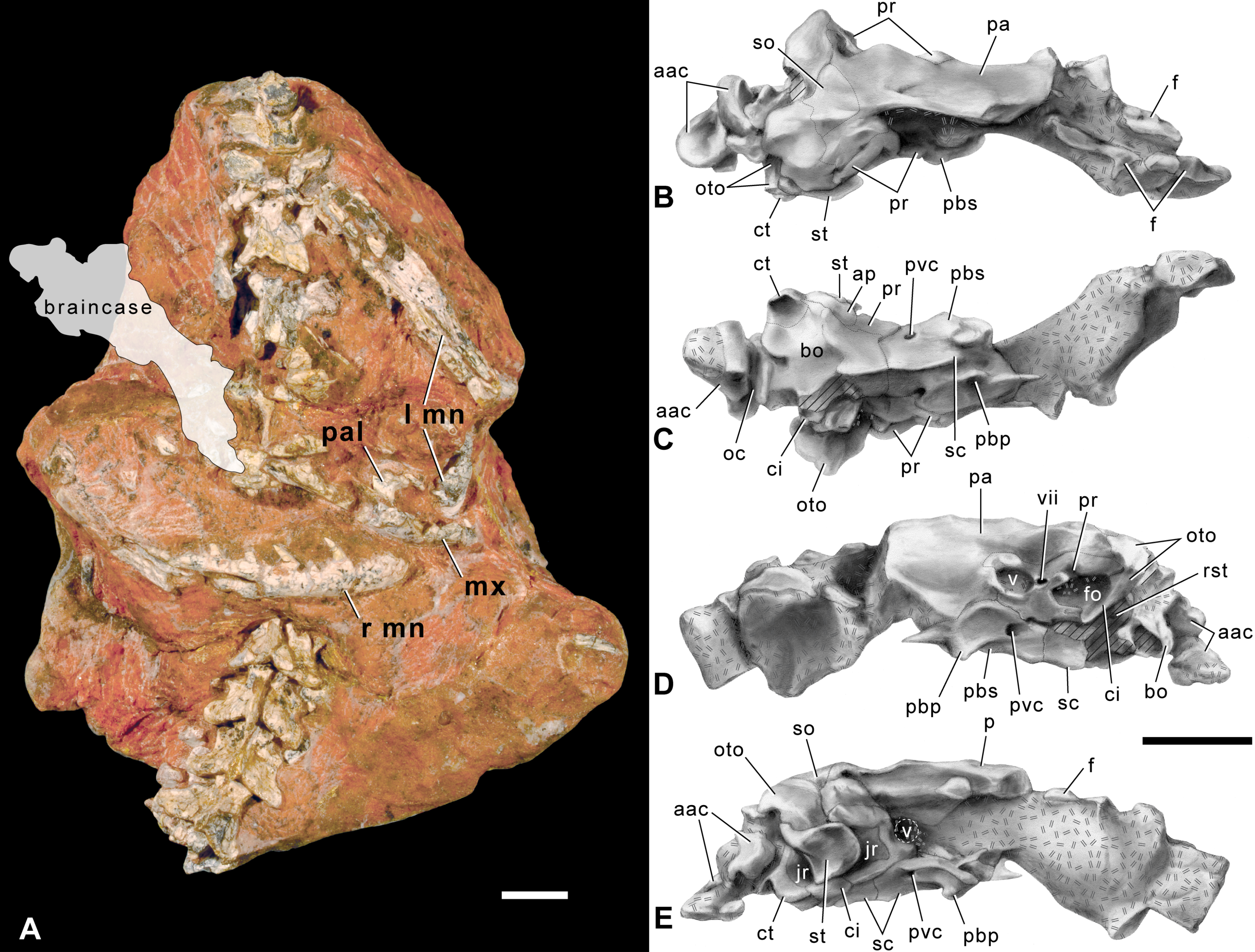
Skull

The holotype specimen, known as GSI/GC/2901–2906, consists of a disarticulated skull(consisting of braincase, maxilla, palatine, postfrontal, septomaxilla, mandible and premaxilla), and 72 precloacal vertebrae and ribs preserved in five articulated sections. It was found from Maastrichtian-age calcareous sandstones outcropping in the village of Dholi Dungri in Gujarat.

Sanajeh was around 3.5 metres (11 ft) in length based on the length of the skull, which is 95 millimetres (3.7 in). On the side of the skull there is an opening called the juxtastapedial recess, which is characteristically rectangular. The juxtastapedial recess would have contained cranial nerves associated with the ear, while another opening located in front of the recess, the trigeminal foramen, housed cranial nerves associated with the jaws. The jaw joint of Sanajeh is located to the side of the posterior margin of the braincase, which is characteristic of basal snakes. A sagittal crest runs along the ventral surface of the braincase and served as an attachment for protractor pterygoidei muscles that moved the toothed bones of the palate.

Articulations between the vertebrae are well developed in Sanajeh in a similar way to other madtsoiids and the genus Najash. The neural spines are thin and angled posteriorly. In Sanajeh, the synapophyses, or rib articulations, extend outward past the margins of the prezygapophyses. This is a characteristic of all madtsoiids.

== Classification ==
Sanajeh is a member of the Madtsoiidae, an extinct family of snakes that includes the Australian genera Wonambi and Yurlunggur. Below is a cladogram showing the phylogenetic relations of Sanajeh:

- Serpentes
  - Scolecophidia
  - Najash rionegrina
  - - Dinilysia patagonica
    - Alethinophidia
      - - Anilius
        - - Cylindrophis
          - - Uropeltinae
            - Anomochilus
      - - Madtsoiidae
          - Sanajeh indicus
          - - Wonambi
            - Yurlunggur
        - - Loxocemus
          - Macrostomata
            - Pachyophiidae
            - - - Ungaliophinae
                - - Erycinae
                  - - Pythonidae
                    - Boinae
              - - Bolyeriidae
                - - Tropidophiinae
                  - - Acrochordus
                    - Colubroidea

In 2022, a morphological study found Madtsoiidae as previously defined to be paraphyletic, with Sanajeh being the most basal member of the Ophidia, while the Australian "madtsoiids" from the Cenozoic are basal alethinophidians.

== Paleobiology ==
=== Feeding ===
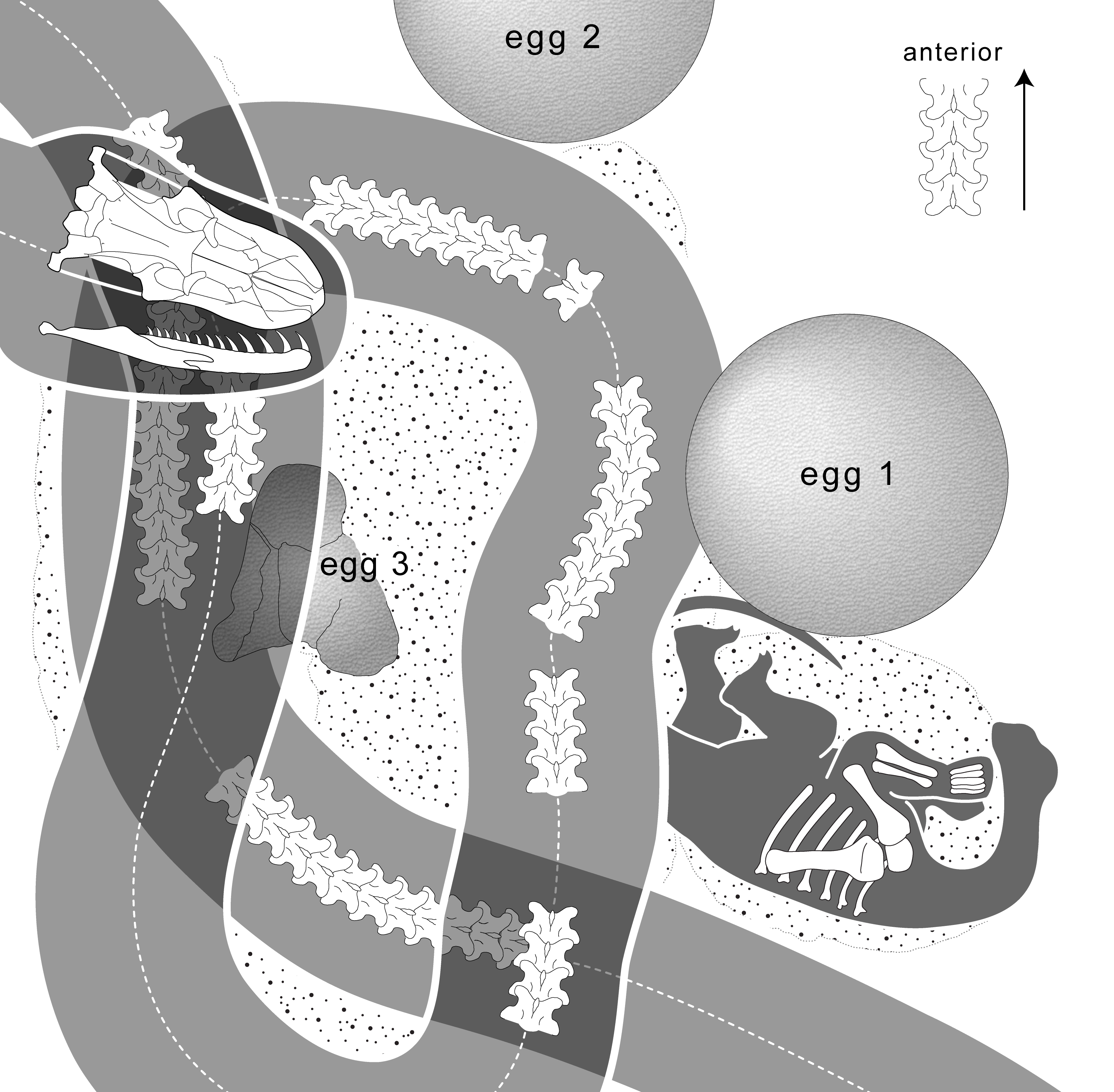
Diagram of the fossil

Like many early snakes, Sanajeh did not have the wide gape seen in boids, pythons, and caenophidians. Therefore, it could not consume prey as large as that which many modern snakes can. Living snakes that have narrow gapes, including uropeltids, Anomochilus, Cylindrophis, and Anilius, have diets that are limited to smaller animals such as ants, termite larvae, annelids, and amphisbaenians and caecilians. The short supratemporal and broad, short quadrate indicate that the oral gape of Sanajeh was narrow. The gape is thought to have been similar to that of the extant genus Xenopeltis. However, the presence of strong m. protractor pterygoidei muscles inferred from the sagittal crest of Sanajeh indicates that it was able to manipulate prey in its mouth like modern macrostomatans. The intramandibular joint was able to flex greatly, which would allow for the consumption of larger prey. The presence of these features in Sanajeh shows that increased oral kinesis (movement of the mouth) and intraoral mobility (the ability to move the bones of the palate) preceded the development of wide gapes in snakes. Therefore, reduced cranial kinesis in basal living snakes may be a fossorial adaptation rather than the retention of a plesiomorphic trait.

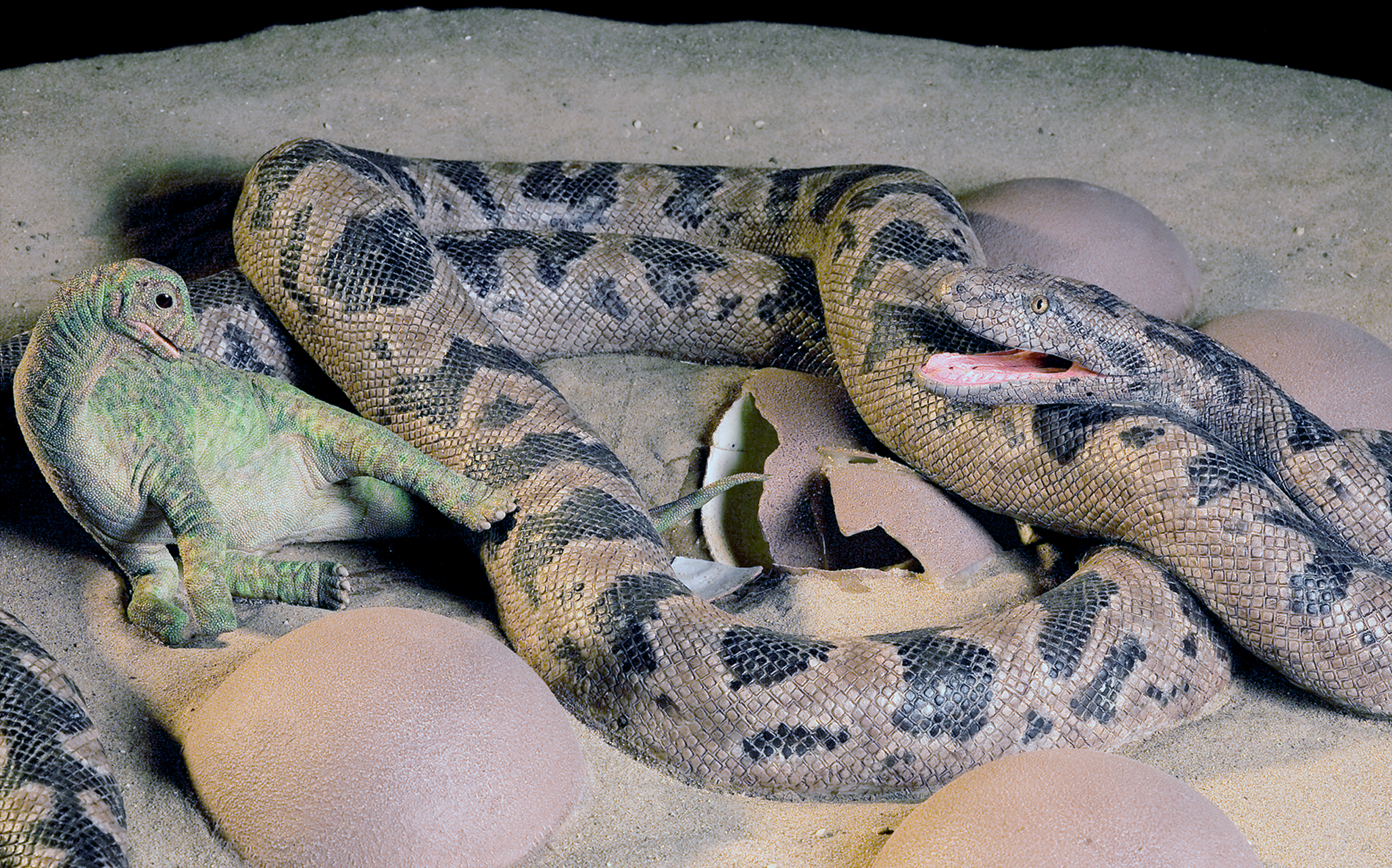
A model showing Sanajeh indicus feeding from a titanosaur nest.

The holotype of Sanajeh was found in association with sauropod eggs belonging to the oospecies Megaloolithus dhoridungriensis and one incompletely preserved sauropod hatchling, likely a titanosaur. The snake was coiled around a crushed egg, which the hatchling may have exited from. The eggs were laid in a nest structure that was not preserved, but was likely covered in loose sediment or vegetation based on the porosity of the eggs. The rigid eggs were probably too large for Sanajeh to consume, but the snake would have been able to break an egg open and consume its contents in a way similar to the living Loxocemus. Sanajeh is likely to have had a nest-plundering feeding strategy, and it is possible that the snake consumed a large variety of prey items including the eggs of theropods and smaller reptiles, which are common in the Lameta Formation.

Accelerated growth rates and large numbers of hatchlings would have enabled titanosaurs such as Isisaurus and Jainosaurus to overcome the losses of predation by animals such as Sanajeh. Titanosaurs would have been free of the risk of predation by their first year as a result of their rapid growth rate. The size of adult titanosaurs, which could be 20–25 metres (66–82 ft) in length, would have deterred nearly all predators.
