= Powellophis =

Powellophis Temporal range: Selandian-Thanetian, 61–57 Ma

Scientific classification
- Kingdom: Animalia
- Phylum: Chordata
- Class: Reptilia
- Order: Squamata
- Family: †Madtsoiidae
- Genus: †Powellophis
- Species: †P. andina

Binomial name
- †Powellophis andina Garberoglio, Triviño & Albino, 2022

Extinct madtsoiid snake

Powellophis is a genus of extinct madtsoiid snake from the Mealla Formation of Argentina, dating back to the Paleocene. It is a monospecific genus, with the only species being P. andina.

== Discovery and naming ==
The holotype of Powellophis, specimen PVL 4714, preserves a nearly complete and articulated skeleton in nine continuous siltstone blocks. However, only blocks 4714-2 to 4714-9 were available for study. This means that other blocks from the holotype specimen are not included in the paper naming the genus. The animal shares some features of its vertebral morphology with other mid to large sized madtsoiids. Powellophis is quantitatively estimated to have been around 3 m (9.8 ft) in length based on measures of vertebrae and total length in extant snakes.

The genus name Powellophis means "Jaime Powell's Snake". The name is constructed from the words Powell and ophis, the former in honor of the late Dr. Jaime Powell who recovered the specimen and the latter meaning snake in Ancient Greek. The specific name andina is named for the Andes region of Northwestern Argentina, where the fossil remains of the animal were discovered.

== Classification ==
In the phylogeny from Garberoglio, Triviño & Albino (2022), Powellophis is recovered as a sister taxon to Eomadtsoia and a basal member of a clade that includes most large bodied and gigantic members of the group like Gigantophis, Wonambi, and Madtsoia. A clade with similar genus composition, although lacking Powellophis, was recovered in 2019 by Gómez, Garberoglio & Rougier.

== Paleoenvironment ==
Powellophis inhabited the Mealla Formation, dating to the middle to late paleocene of Northwestern Argentina. The preserved vertebrate fauna from this formation includes teleostean fishes, pelomedusid turtles, sebecid crocodillians and notoungulate mammals. The environmental interpretation indicates the presence of a sandy, meandering fluvial system with low energy and low sinuosity, mud dominated floodplains with paleosol development, and shallow, freshwater clastic lakes with periods of subaerial exposure.
