= Sunil Bajpai =

Indian Paleontologist

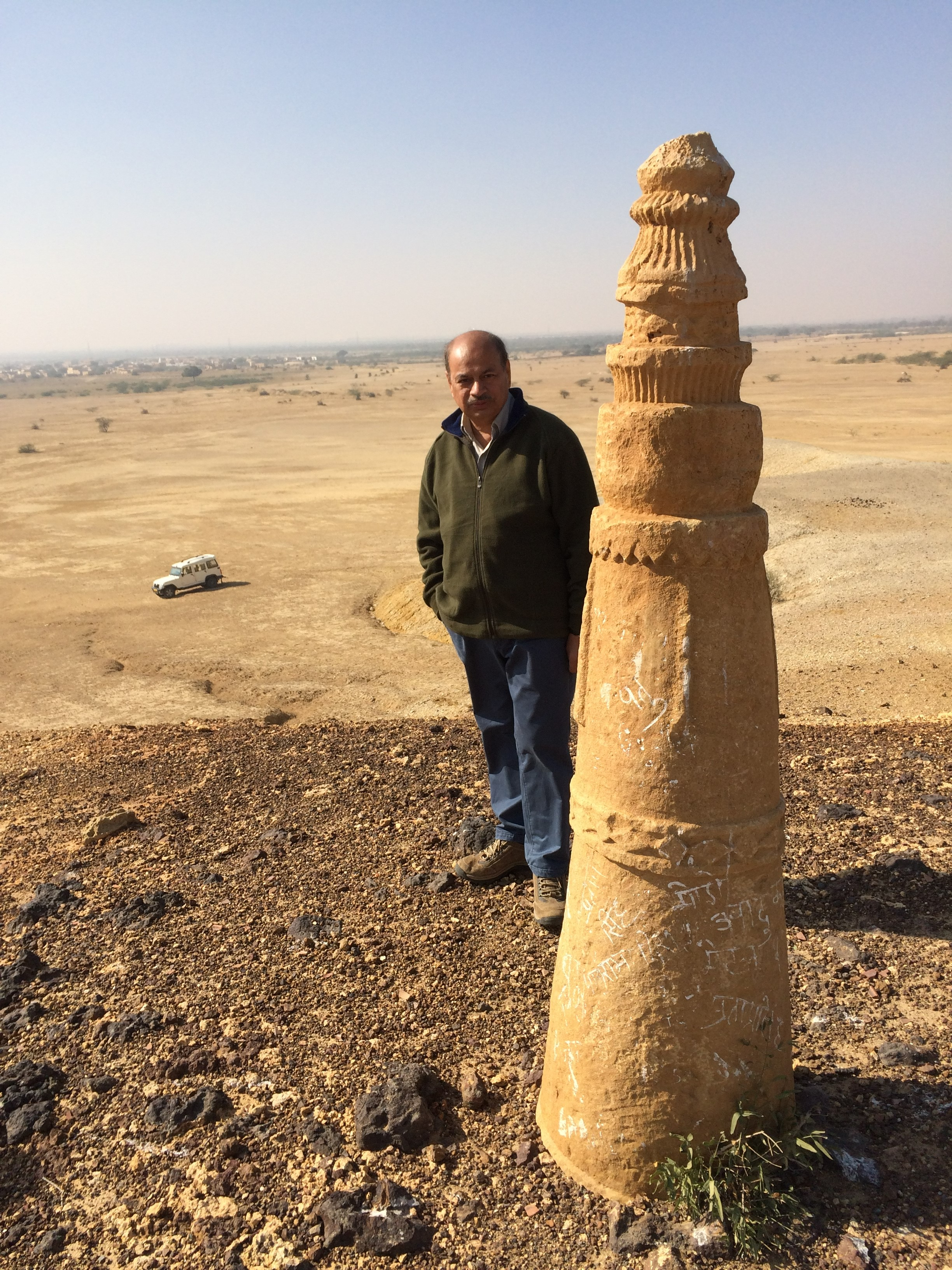
- Sunil Bajpai during field work near Jaisalmer City
- Born: 30 September 1961 (age 65)
- Education: Ph.D. in Paleontology
- Alma mater: Panjab University, Chandigarh
- Occupation: Vertebrate Paleontologist
- Employer(s): Indian Institute of Technology Roorkee, Uttarakhand
- Organization(s): Former Director, Birbal Sahni Institute of Palaeosciences, Lucknow

Sunil Bajpai (born 30 September 1961) is the Chair Professor of Vertebrate Paleontology in the Department of Earth Sciences, Indian Institute of Technology Roorkee. He is in service as a professor at IIT Roorkee since 1 January 1996 till 30 September 2026. He also served as the director of the Birbal Sahni Institute of Palaeosciences from January 2013 to July 2018.

Sunil Bajpai predominantly works on the Cenozoic vertebrates of India with focus on marine mammals, such as whales and sea cows. Bajpai and his collaborators fossil discoveries from the Eocene of Kutch (Gujarat) and the Himalayas have helped in understanding how whales have evolved. Bajpai also works on land mammals, which includes the early representatives of horses, artiodactyls, and primates, such as the stem perissodactyl family Cambaytheriidae, artiodactyl Gujaratia, and primates such as the adapoid Marcgodinotius and the omomyid Vastanomys. Additionally, he has worked on many other fossil vertebrates such as sharks, bony fishes, frogs, snakes, lizards, insectivores, rodents, etc. He has also been involved in studies of latest Cretaceous-Paleocene faunas of the Deccan volcanic province of India and their implications in understanding the northward drift of the Indian tectonic plate.

In 2023, Bajpai and colleagues reported on Tharosaurus indicus, India's first dicraeosaurid dinosaur, from the Thar Desert of Jaisalmer, Rajasthan state, western India. The fossils were unearthed from Middle Jurassic outcrops of the Jaisalmer Formation. The taxon likely represents the oldest known record of this group and, seen in conjunction with previously known early Jurassic sauropods from India (Barapasaurus, Kotasaurus), suggests that what is now India may have been a major centre for neosauropod evolution. In 2024, he coauthored the descriptions of what may be the largest known madtsoiid snake, Vasuki indicus from Naredi Formation, and the mammal Indotriconodon from the Late Cretaceous Intertrappean Beds.

== Education ==
Bajpai carried out his Ph.D. studies in Paleontology from the Centre of Advanced Study in Geology, Panjab University, Chandigarh, in 1990.

== Honors and awards ==
- Fellow of the National Academy of Sciences, India (2008)
- Fellow of the Indian Academy of Sciences (2007)
- National Geoscience Award, Ministry of Mines, Government of India (2014)
- National award for Geosciences and Technology, Ministry of Earth Sciences, Govt of India (2018)
- J C Bose National Fellowship 2026
- Ptilotrypa bajpaii a fossil bryozoan, and Limnocythere bajpaii a fossil ostracod are named after Bajpai in recognition of his contributions

== Collaborators ==
J. G. M. Thewissen, the Dutch-American Paleontologist from the Northeast Ohio Medical University, Rootstow, whose research is mainly focused on whale evolution, and Daryl Domning from Howard University, Washington D.C., specialist of fossil sirenians have been the main collaborators of Bajpai.

== Selected publications ==
- Bajpai, Sunil; Gingerich, Philip D. (1998). "A new Eocene archaeocete (Mammalia, Cetacea) from India and the time of origin of whales". Proceedings of the National Academy of Sciences, USA. 95 (26): 15464–15468. Bibcode:1998PNAS...9515464B. doi:10.1073/pnas.95.26.15464. ISSN 0027-8424. PMC 28065. PMID 9860991.
- Bajpai, Sunil; Kapur, Vivesh V; Das, Debasis P; Tiwari, B N; Saravanan, N; Sharma, Ritu (2005). Early Eocene land mammals from the Vastan Lignite Mine, District Surat (Gujarat), western India Journal of the Palaeontological Society of India.
- Bajpai, Sunil; Kay, Richard F.; Williams, Blythe A.; Das, Debasis P.; Kapur, Vivesh V.; Tiwari, B. N. (2008). "The oldest Asian record of Anthropoidea". Proceedings of the National Academy of Sciences, USA. 105 (32): 11093–11098. doi:10.1073/pnas.0804159105. ISSN 0027-8424.
- Bajpai, S.; Sahni, A. (2009). "India's fossil biota: Current perspectives and Emerging Approaches". Journal of Biosciences. 34 (5, special issue). doi:10.1007/s12038-009-0082-7.
- Spoor, F.; Bajpai, S.; Hussain, S. T.; Kumar, K.; Thewissen, J. G. M. (2002). "Vestibular evidence for the evolution of aquatic behaviour in early cetaceans". Nature. 417 (6885): 163–166. Bibcode:2002Natur.417..163S. doi:10.1038/417163a. ISSN 0028-0836. PMID 12000957. S2CID 4331789.
- Thewissen, J. G. M.; Cooper, Lisa Noelle; Clementz, Mark T.; Bajpai, Sunil; Tiwari, B. N. (2007). "Whales originated from aquatic artiodactyls in the Eocene epoch of India". Nature. 450 (7173): 1190–1194. Bibcode:2007Natur.450.1190T. doi:10.1038/nature06343. ISSN 0028-0836. PMID 18097400. S2CID 4416444.
