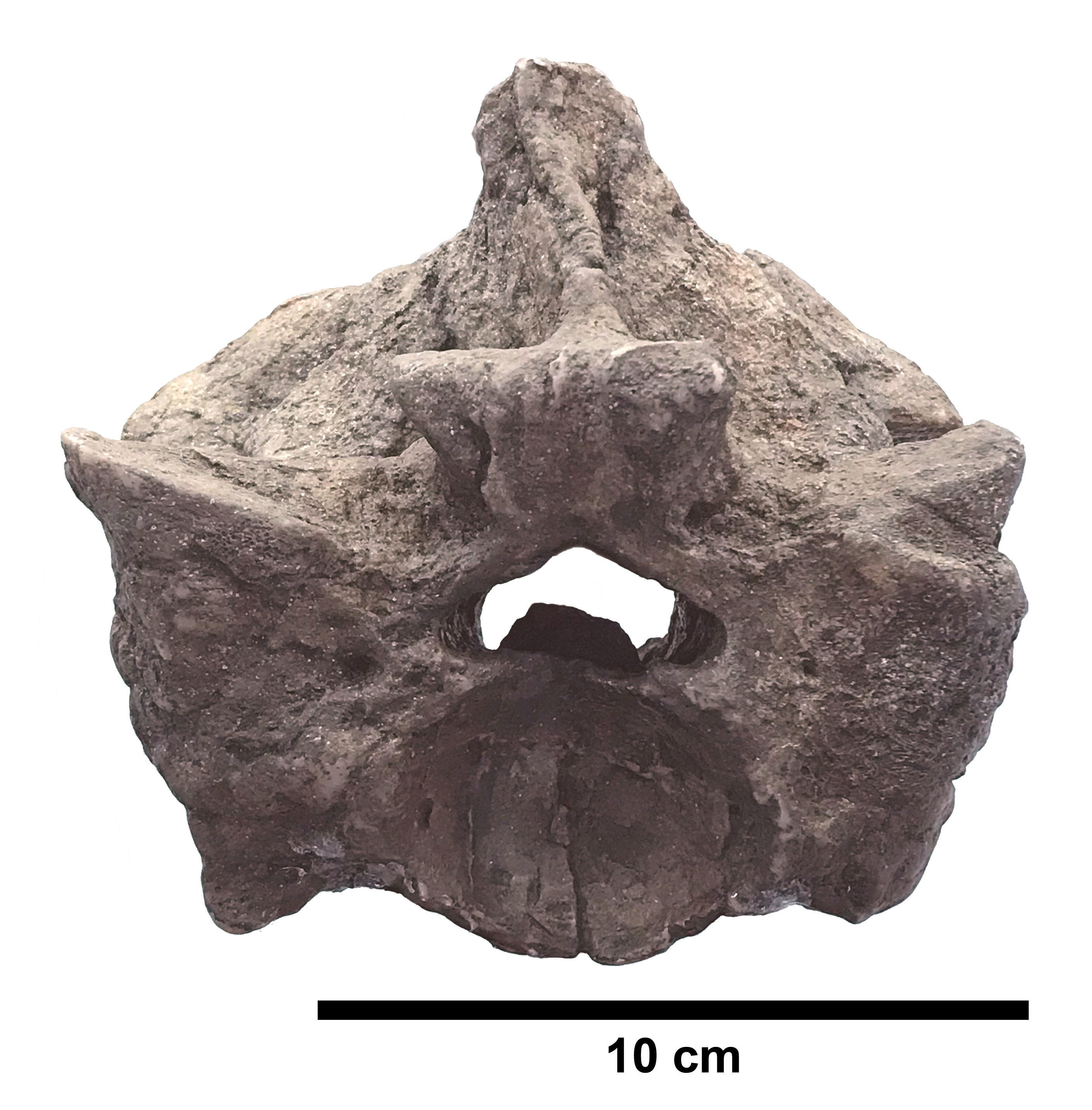
- Paratype dorsal vertebra of T. cerrejonensis

Conservation status
- Extinct

Scientific classification
- Kingdom: Animalia
- Phylum: Chordata
- Class: Reptilia
- Order: Squamata
- Suborder: Serpentes
- Family: Boidae
- Genus: †Titanoboa; Head et al., 2009
- Species: †T. cerrejonensis

Binomial name
- †Titanoboa cerrejonensis Head et al., 2009

= Titanoboa =

Titanoboa Temporal range: Mid-Late Paleocene (Peligran-Itaboraian) ~60–58 Ma

Extinct genus of snakes

Titanoboa (/ˌtaɪtənəˈboʊə/; lit. 'titanic boa') is a genus of extinct giant boid snake (being the biological family of all boas and anacondas) that lived during the middle and late Paleocene epoch. Titanoboa was first discovered in the early 2000s by members of the Smithsonian Tropical Research Institute, which – along with students from the University of Florida – recovered 186 fossils of Titanoboa from the Cerrejón coal mines in the La Guajira department of northeastern Colombia. It was named and described in 2009 as Titanoboa cerrejonensis, and lauded as the largest snake ever found at that time. The original type material consisted of thoracic vertebrae and ribs, but later expeditions collected parts of the skull and teeth.

Titanoboa is estimated to grow up to 12.8 m (42 ft) or perhaps even up to 14.3 m (47 ft) long, and weigh around 730 to 1,135 kg (1,610 to 2,500 lb). The discovery of Titanoboa cerrejonensis supplanted the previous record holder, Gigantophis garstini, which is known from the Eocene of Egypt. Titanoboa evolved following the extinction of all nonavian dinosaurs, being one of the largest reptiles that lived after the Cretaceous–Paleogene extinction event. Its vertebrae are very robust and wide, with a pentagonal shape in anterior view, as in other members of Boinae; the genus is considered to be most closely related to other extant boines from the Indo-Pacific region, such as those from Madagascar. Titanoboa is thought to have been a semi-aquatic apex predator, with a diet consisting primarily of fish.

== History and naming ==
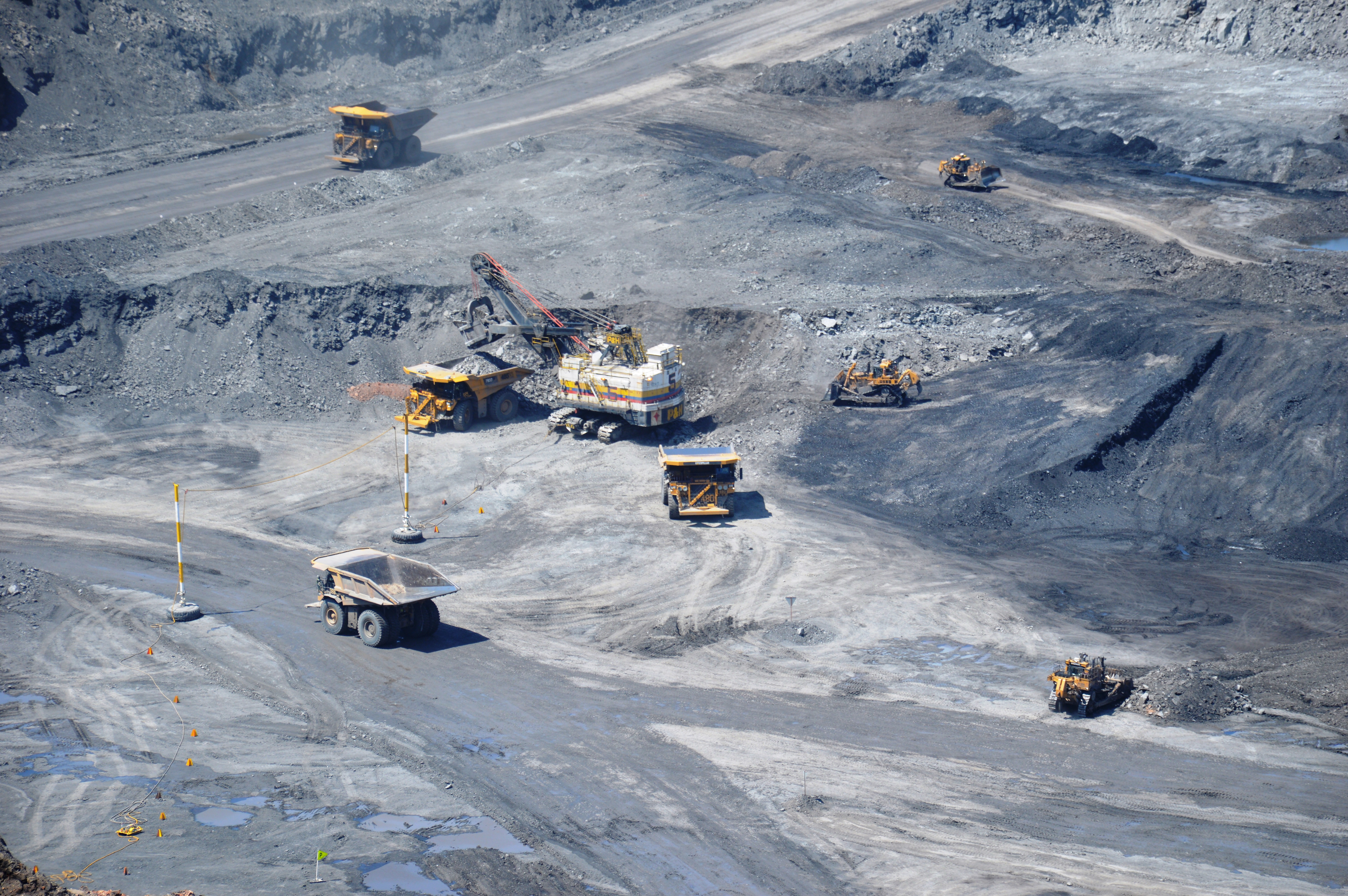
Example of a coal mine in Cerrejón in Colombia, where Titanoboa was found

During an expedition in 2002 to the coal mines of Cerrejón in La Guajira, which was launched by the University of Florida and Smithsonian Tropical Research Institute, large thoracic vertebrae and ribs were unearthed by the students Jonathon Bloch and Carlos Jaramillo. More fossils were unearthed over the course of the expedition, eventually totaling 186 specimens from 30 individuals. These fossils were found in association with those of other reptiles from the Cerrejón Formation, such as turtles and crocodilians, which date to the mid-late Paleocene epoch (around 60–58 million years ago, Mya), a period just after the Cretaceous–Paleogene extinction event which occurred 66 Mya. Before this discovery, few fossils of Paleocene-epoch vertebrates had been found in ancient tropical environments of South America. The expedition lasted until 2004, during which the fossils that would eventually be used to describe Titanoboa were mistakenly labeled as belonging to crocodyleans. The fossils were then transported to the Florida Museum of Natural History, where they were studied and described by an international team of Canadian, American, and Panamanian scientists in 2009 led by Jason J. Head of the University of Toronto. After being recognized as the remains of a snake species, they were identified as belonging to a novel species of giant boid snake that they named Titanoboa cerrejonensis. The generic name derives from the Greek word "Titan" in addition to Boa, the type genus of the family Boidae. The specific name is a reference to its locality, the Cerrejón region. The designated holotype is a single dorsal vertebra cataloged as UF/IGM 1, which is used by Head et al. (2009) to complete the initial size estimates of T. cerrejonensis.

Another expedition to Cerrejón launched in 2011 found more fossils from Titanoboa. Most notably, the group returned with three disarticulated skulls of Titanoboa, making it one of the few fossil snakes with preserved cranial material. They were associated with postcranial material, cementing their referral to the species. Though the skulls are undescribed, an article about them by the BBC in 2012 and an abstract in the annals of the Society of Vertebrate Paleontology have been published. A documentary on the animal titled Titanoboa: Monster Snake aired in 2012 in addition to a touring exhibit of the same name, which lasted from 2013 to 2018.

In 2023, some of the vertebrae from the referred specimen UF/IGM 16 were reassigned to an indeterminate palaeophiine, a different type of aquatic snake.

== Description ==
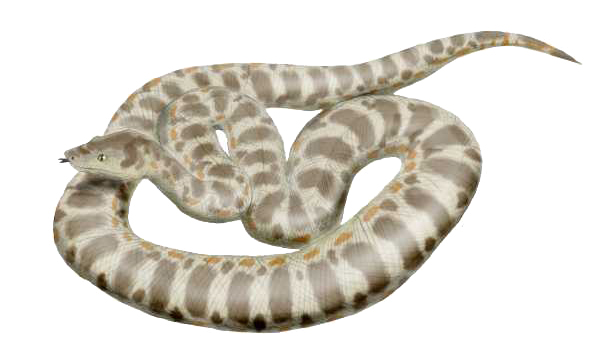
Life restoration of Titanoboa

Titanoboa specimens are either incomplete or undescribed, consisting primarily of thoracic vertebrae that were located before (anterior of) the cloaca, which possess the same characteristics as other boids and especially Boa, such as a short, posteriorly pointing prezygapophyseal process. However, Titanoboa's vertebrae are distinct due to being very robust and with a uniquely T-shaped neural spine, which also has an expanded posterior margin and a thin, blade-like anterior process. It also has much smaller foramina (small pits in bone) on its center and lateral sides, contrary to those of many other boids.

The skull material is only briefly described in a 2013 abstract. According to it, Titanoboa has a high amount of palatal and marginal tooth positions compared to other boids. The quadrate bone is oriented at a low angle and the articulation (joint) of both the palatine to pterygoid and pterygoid to quadrate are heavily reduced, a trait absent in its relatives. The teeth themselves are weakly ankylosed; they are not strongly connected to the jawbone.

=== Size ===
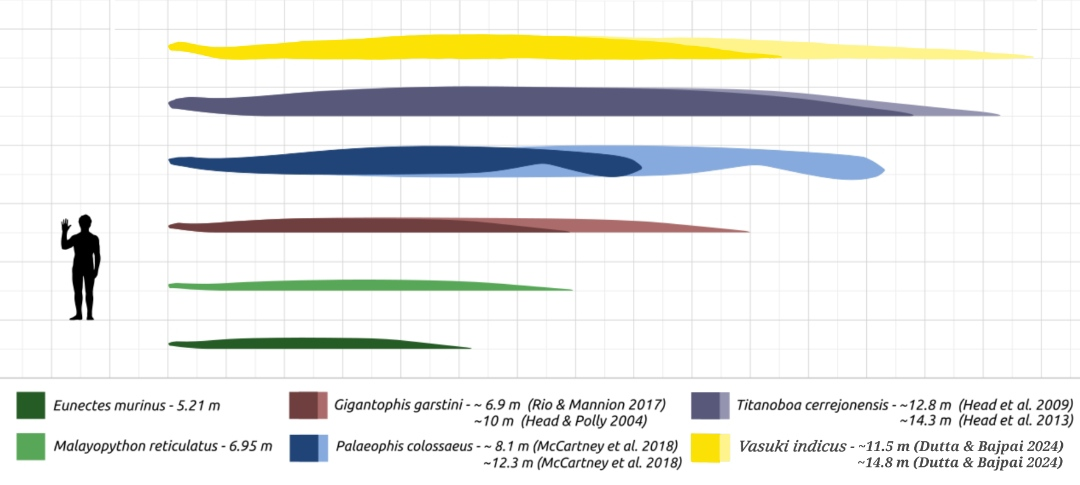
The relative size of Titanoboa compared to the modern human, Vasuki, Palaeophis, Gigantophis, the reticulated python, and green anaconda

Based on the size of the vertebrae, Titanoboa is the largest snake in the fossil record. In modern constrictors such as boids and pythonids, increased body size is achieved through larger vertebrae rather than an increase in the number of bones making up the skeleton, allowing for length estimates based on individual bones. Based on comparison between the undistorted Titanoboa vertebrae and the skeleton of modern boas, Head and colleagues found that the analyzed specimens fit a position towards the ventral series of the pre-cloacal vertebral column, about 60 to 65% down the spine counting from the first two neck vertebrae. Using this method, initial size estimates proposed a total body length of around 12.82 m (42.1 ft) (± 2.18 m (7 ft 2 in)). The mass was determined by comparing Titanoboa to the extant green anaconda and southern rock python, resulting in a weight between 652 and 1,819 kg (1,437 and 4,010 lb) (mean estimate 1,135 kg (2,502 lb)). The existence of eight additional specimens of similar size to the one used in these calculations implies that Titanoboa reached such massive proportions regularly. The later discovery of skull material allowed for size estimates based on skull-to-body-length proportions: applying anaconda proportions to the 40 cm (16 in) skull of Titanoboa results in a total body length around 14.3 m (47 ft) (± 1.28 m (4 ft 2 in)). In 2016, Feldman and his colleagues estimated that a 12.8 m (42 ft) long individual would have weighed 730 kg (1,610 lb) at maximum based on their equation to estimate the body size of boids.

These estimates far exceed the largest modern snakes, the green anaconda and the reticulated python, as well as the previous record holder, the madtsoiid Gigantophis. Vasuki indicus, a madtsoiid described in 2024, was subsequently described as the longest snake in the world, even surpassing Titanoboa; although the vertebral dimensions of Vasuki are smaller than those of Titanoboa, the largest length estimates of 12.8 m (42 ft) ± 2.2 m (7 ft 3 in) may indicate a longer body for Vasuki.

== Classification ==
Titanoboa is placed in the family Boidae, a family of snakes containing the "constrictors", that evolved during the Late Cretaceous in what is now the Americas. They are a widely distributed group, with six subfamilies found on nearly every continent, with Titanoboa being in the subfamily Boinae based on vertebrae morphology. All known boines are from the Americas, reaching as far north as Mexico and the Antilles and south to Argentina. Titanoboa is also the only extinct boine genus known; all other boine genera are still living.

The skull material confirmed Titanoboa's initial placement within the subfamily by the occurrence of reduced palatine choanals. The 2013 abstract recovered Titanoboa as closely related to taxa from the Pacific Islands and Madagascar, linking the Old World and New World boids and suggesting that the two lineages diverged by the Paleocene at the latest. This would place Titanoboa at the stem of Boinae, a result corroborated by a study in 2015; the following cladogram is based on this study's phylogenetic analysis:

- - Candoia
  - - Erycinae
    - Boinae
      - Titanoboa
      - Boa
      - Corallus
        - Corallus priscus
        - extant Corallus
      - - Chilabothrus
        - - Epicrates
          - - Eunectes stirtoni
            - extant Eunectes

== Paleobiology ==
=== Diet ===
Initially, Titanoboa was thought to have acted much like a modern anaconda based on its size and the environment where it lived, with researchers suggesting that it may have fed on the dyrosaurid Cerrejonisuchus (in which the giant snake may have killed the crocodyliform by constriction). In the 2013 abstract, Head and colleagues noted that the skull of this snake displays multiple adaptations to a piscivorous diet, including the anatomy of the palate, the tooth count, and the anatomy of the teeth themselves. These adaptations are not seen in other boids, but closely resemble those in modern caenophidian snakes with piscivorous diets. Such a lifestyle would be supported by the extensive river systems of Paleocene Colombia, as well as the fish (being fossil lungfish and osteoglossomorphs) recovered from the formation. Though, given its large size, its still possible for it to prey on other animals, such as turtles and the aforementioned crocodyliforms.

=== Habitat ===
Due to the warm and humid greenhouse climate of the Paleocene, the region of what is now Cerrejón was a coastal plain covered by wet, tropical forests with large river systems, which were inhabited by various freshwater animals. Among the native reptiles are three different genera of dyrosaurs, which are crocodylomorphs that survived the KPG extinction event independently from modern crocodilians. The genera that coexisted alongside Titanoboa included the large, slender-snouted Acherontisuchus, the medium-sized but broad-headed Anthracosuchus, and the relatively small Cerrejonisuchus. Turtles also thrived in the tropical wetlands of Paleocene Colombia, giving rise to several species of considerable size such as Cerrejonemys and Carbonemys.

The rainforests of the Cerrejón Formation mirror modern tropical forests in regard to which families make up most of the vegetation, but unlike modern tropical forests, these Paleocene forests had fewer species. Although this low species diversity was possibly a result of the wetland nature of the depositional environment, samples from other localities in the same timeframe suggest that all of the forests that arose shortly following the Cretaceous-Paleogene mass extinction were of similar composition. This indicates that the low plant diversity of the time was a direct result of the mass extinction preceding it. Plants found in these Paleocene forests include the floating fern Salvinia and various genera of Zingiberales and Araceae.

=== Climate implications ===
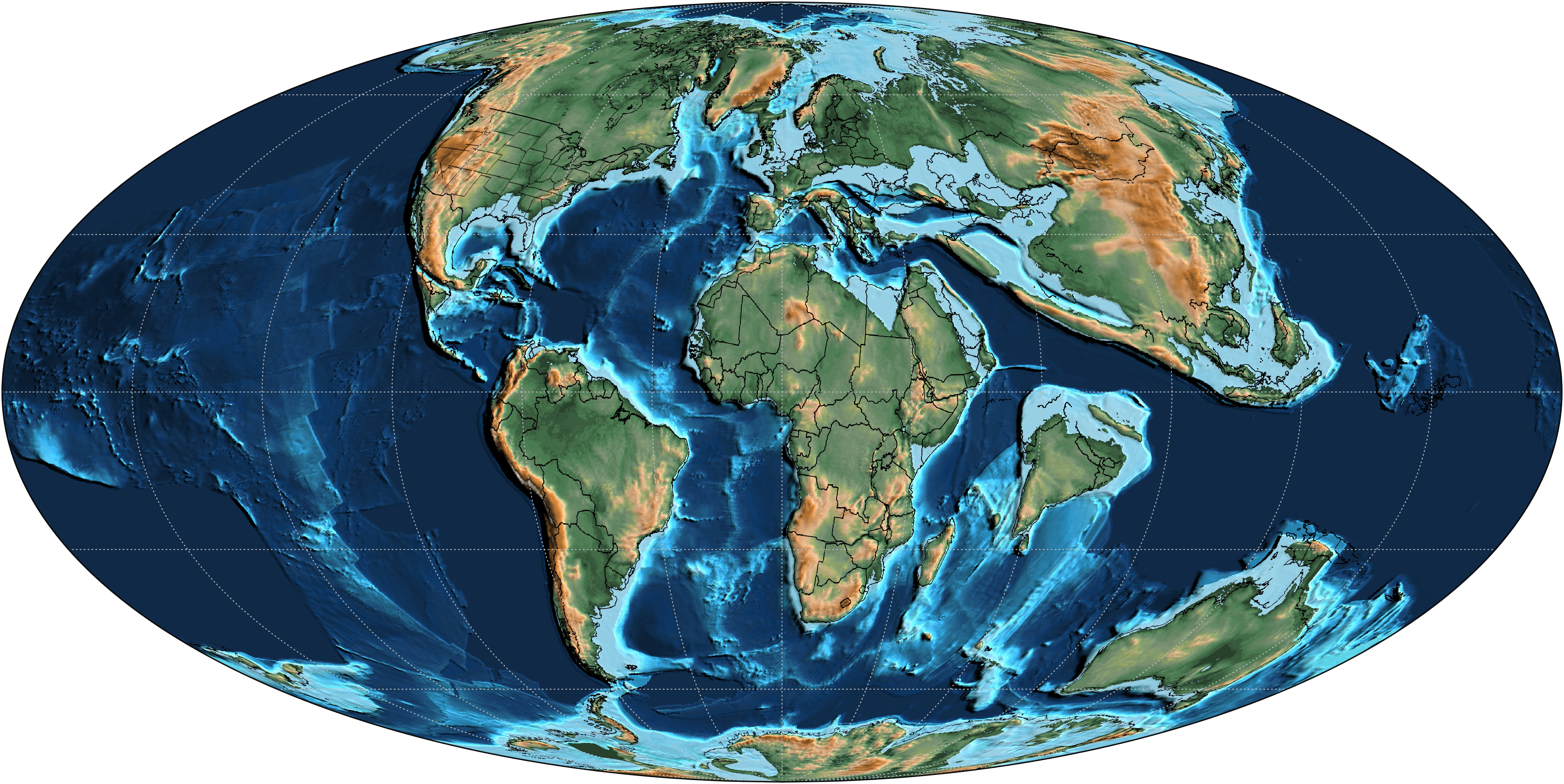
Earth during the Paleocene when Titanoboa lived

In the 2009 type description, Head and colleagues correlate the gigantism observed in Titanoboa with the climate conditions of its environment. As a poikilothermic ectotherm, Titanoboa's internal temperature and metabolism were heavily dependent on the ambient temperature, which would, in turn, affect the animal's size. Accordingly, large ectothermic animals are typically found in the tropics and decrease in size further away from the equator. Following this correlation, the authors suggest that the mean annual temperature can be calculated by comparing the maximum body size of poikilotherm animals found in two localities. Based on the relation between temperatures in the modern Neotropics and the maximum length of anacondas, Head and colleagues calculated a mean annual temperature of at least 32–33 °C (90–91 °F) for the equatorial region of Paleocene South America. The estimates are consistent with a hot Paleocene climate as suggested by a study published in 2003 and slightly higher (1–5 °C (34–41 °F)) than estimates derived from the oxygen isotopes of planktonic foraminiferans. Although these estimates exceed temperatures of modern tropical forests, the paper argued that the increase in temperature was balanced out by higher amounts of rainfall.

This conclusion was subsequently questioned by several researchers following the publication of the paper. J. M. Kale Sniderman used the same methodology as Head and colleagues on the Pleistocene monitor lizard Varanus priscus (megalania), comparing it to the extant Komodo dragon. Sniderman calculates that following this method, the modern tropics should be able to support lizards much larger than what is observed today, or in the reverse, that Varanus priscus is much larger than what would be implied by the ambient temperature of its native range. In conclusion, it argued that Paleocene rainforests may not have been any hotter than those today and that the massive size of Titanoboa and V. priscus may instead be the result of lacking significant competition from other animals, such as mammals. Mark W. Denny, Brent L. Lockwood, and George N. Somero also disagreed with Head's conclusion, noting that although this method is applicable to smaller poikilotherms, it is not constant across all size ranges. As thermal equilibrium is achieved through the relation between volume and surface area, they argue that the large size of Titanoboa coupled with the high temperatures proposed by Head et al. would mean that the animal would overheat easily if resting in a coiled up state. The authors conclude that several key factors influence the relationship between Titanoboa and the temperature of the area it inhabited. Varying posture could help it cool down if needed, basking behavior or heat absorption through the substrate are both unknown and the potentially semi-aquatic nature of the animal creates additional factors to consider. Ultimately, Denny and colleagues argue that the nature of the giant snake renders it a poor indicator for the climate of the Paleocene and that the mean annual temperature must have been 4 to 6 °C (39 to 43 °F) cooler than the current estimate.

These issues, alongside adjustments suggested by Makarieva, were addressed by Head and his team the same year, arguing that Denny and colleagues misunderstand their proposed model. They retort that the method takes into account variation caused by body size, and that it furthermore is based on the largest extant snakes, making it an appropriate method. They also add that the recovered results are consistent with large extant snakes, which are also known to perform thermoregulation through behavior. Sniderman's proposal that the correlation between body size and temperature is inconsistent with modern monitor lizards is addressed twofold. For one, Head argues, Komodo dragons are a poor analogy, as they are geographically restricted to a few Indonesian islands, limiting the size to which they could grow, while both green anacondas and Titanoboa are mainland animals. Secondly, the response notes that the size estimates used for V. priscus are overestimates and unreliable, being based on secondary reports that do not match better supported estimates indicating a 2.19–4.7 m (7 ft 2 in – 15 ft 5 in) range for the monitor.

== See also ==
- List of largest snakes
- Prehistoric snakes
- Anaconda
- Boa constrictor
- Python (genus)
