= Menarana =

Menarana Temporal range: Late Cretaceous, 70–66 Ma

Scientific classification
- Domain: Eukaryota
- Kingdom: Animalia
- Phylum: Chordata
- Class: Reptilia
- Order: Squamata
- Family: †Madtsoiidae
- Genus: †Menarana; Laduke et al., 2010

Species
- M. nosymena Laduke et al., 2010 (type); M. laurasiae Rage, 1996

Extinct genus of snakes

Menarana is an extinct genus of madtsoiid snake which existed in Madagascar during the Late Cretaceous. The type species is Menarana nosymena. Several vertebrae and rib fragments as well as part of the basicranium have been found from the Maastrichtian-age Maevarano Formation in the Mahajanga Basin.

== Paleobiology ==
Menarana was around 2.4 metres (7.9 ft) long and was probably fossorial, burrowing with its head. Evidence of a fossorial lifestyle can be found in its braincase, as the bones of the basicranium are highly fused to withstand stresses from burrowing. This degree of fusion is otherwise only seen in caecilians, amphisbaenians, and uropeltid snakes, all of which are highly specialized burrowers. The vertebrae are depressed and have very low neural spines similar to those of living burrowing snakes. The atlas, which is the first vertebra of the spine closest to the head, may show adaptations toward structural integrity under loads that would be encountered during tunnel excavation. The neural arches of the atlas are fused to the intercentrum, strengthening the anterior atlantal cotyle, a cup-like depression that articulates with the occipital condyle of the skull.

Despite these features, it is possible that Menarana was not a powerful burrower, and that the burrowing characteristics were retained from a burrowing ancestor. The related madtsoiid Yurlunggur also has a highly fused basicranium, but its snout is unspecialized and unsuitable for digging. Moreover, its large body size would have made it difficult to burrow through compact soils. This indicates that ancestral fossorial characteristics can be retained even if the snake was not fossorial.

While Menarana is less than half the size of Yurlunggur, it would have also encountered problems while burrowing due to its large size. Most head-first burrowers are very small, with heads that have a small diameter to allow them to push through soil more easily. While most living head-first burrowers are less than 1 centimetre (0.39 in) in diameter, Menarana could have exceeded 7 centimetres (2.8 in) in diameter, with a cross-sectional area even larger than living burrowers because of an increase in size according to a quadratic function (the square of the diameter). Therefore, Menarana may have required significantly greater force to push through compact sediment, with the force possibly being ineffective or impossible to generate.

Due to its small size, the diet of Menarana probably consisted of prey ranging in mass from 1 kilogram (2.2 lb) to 5 kilograms (11 lb). Menarana would not have been able to consume any of the nonavian dinosaurs that are also known from the Maevarano Formation, and probably could not prey on any crocodylomorphs with the exception of the notosuchian Araripesuchus tsangatsangana. It most likely fed on smaller snakes, lizards, and small mammals.
