= David John Barrie =

Natural historian, palaeontologist, artist, in South Australia

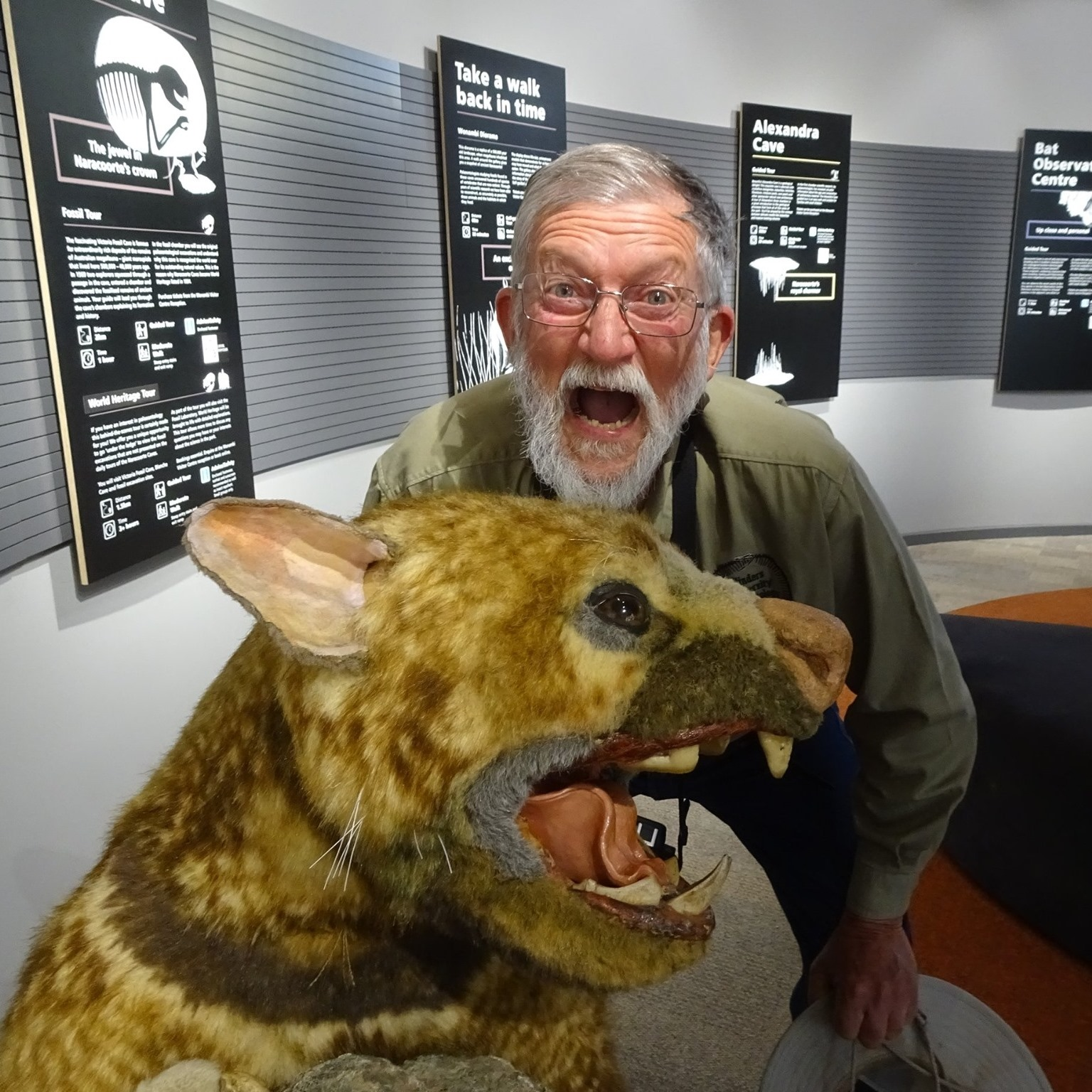
- David John Barrie with a Thylacoleo carnifex replica
- Born: December 22, 1947 (age 78); South Australia, Australia
- Occupations: Natural historian, palaeontologist, artist

David John Barrie (born 22 December 1947), often known as John Barrie or D. John Barrie, is an Australian natural historian and paleontologist known for his contributions to fossil excavations in South Australia. His work has been published in peer-reviewed journals and is represented in the collections of the South Australian Museum in Adelaide. An extinct species of primitive snake, Wonambi barriei, has been named after him.

== Scientific Contributions ==
Barrie participated in fossil excavations at Henschke's Quarry near the World Heritage-listed Naracoorte Caves National Park from 1981 to 1998. Specimens recovered during these excavations, including partial skeletons of a phylogenetically significant primitive snake, Wonambi naracoortensis, and over a thousand remains of Megalibgwilia ramsayi, part of the echidna family, are housed in the South Australian Museum. Barrie's work on Wonambi snakes has been credited by academic herpetology researchers. At the time of Barrie's discovery, and for some two decades thereafter, W. naracoortensis was the most completely known fossil snake discovered in the Australian continent. There are two known species of Wonambi snakes, one of them, W. barriei, was named in honour of Barrie, for collecting and preparing most of the material of W. naracoortensis.

Barrie has co-authored several scientific papers, including descriptions of extinct monotremes and amphibians. His work has appeared in Memoirs of the Queensland Museum, Australian Mammalogy, Records of the South Australian Museum, and Transactions of the Royal Society of South Australia.

== Art and Illustration ==
Barrie’s palaeoart has been commissioned by Flinders University and featured in scientific publications. In 2023, his illustration of Dynatoaetus gaffae, a Late Pleistocene raptor, was published in Alcheringa and used as the journal’s cover image.

His work was also featured in The Guardian Australia, accompanying coverage of prehistoric Australian birds. Barrie’s reconstructions have additionally been credited in independent science reporting, including The Conversation, Phys.org, and ScitechDaily, where his artwork accompanied coverage of extinct Australian raptors.

== Public engagement ==
In 2019, Barrie was interviewed on the Aussie Wildlife Show podcast, where he discussed his fossil excavation work and the significance of Australia’s prehistoric megafauna.

== Selected Publications ==
Barrie has authored or co-authored several peer-reviewed scientific papers in palaeontology and environmental biology:

- Barrie, D. J. (1990). "Skull elements and additional remains of the Pleistocene boid snake *Wonambi naracoortensis*." Memoirs of the Queensland Museum, 28(1), 139–151.
- Griffiths, M., Wells, R. T., & Barrie, D. J. (1991). "Observations on the skulls of fossil and extant echidnas (Monotremata: Tachyglossidae)." Australian Mammalogy, 14(2), 87.
- McNamara, K. J., & Barrie, D. J. (1993). "A new genus of marsupiate spatangoid echinoid from the Miocene of South Australia." Records of the South Australian Museum, 26, 139–147.
- Tyler, M. J., Barrie, D. J., & Walkley, R. W. (1996). "First fossil record of the hylid frog *Litoria raniformis* (Keferstein)." Transactions of the Royal Society of South Australia, 120, 69.
