= William Garstin =

British civil engineer (1849–1925)

Sir William Garstin GCMG GBE
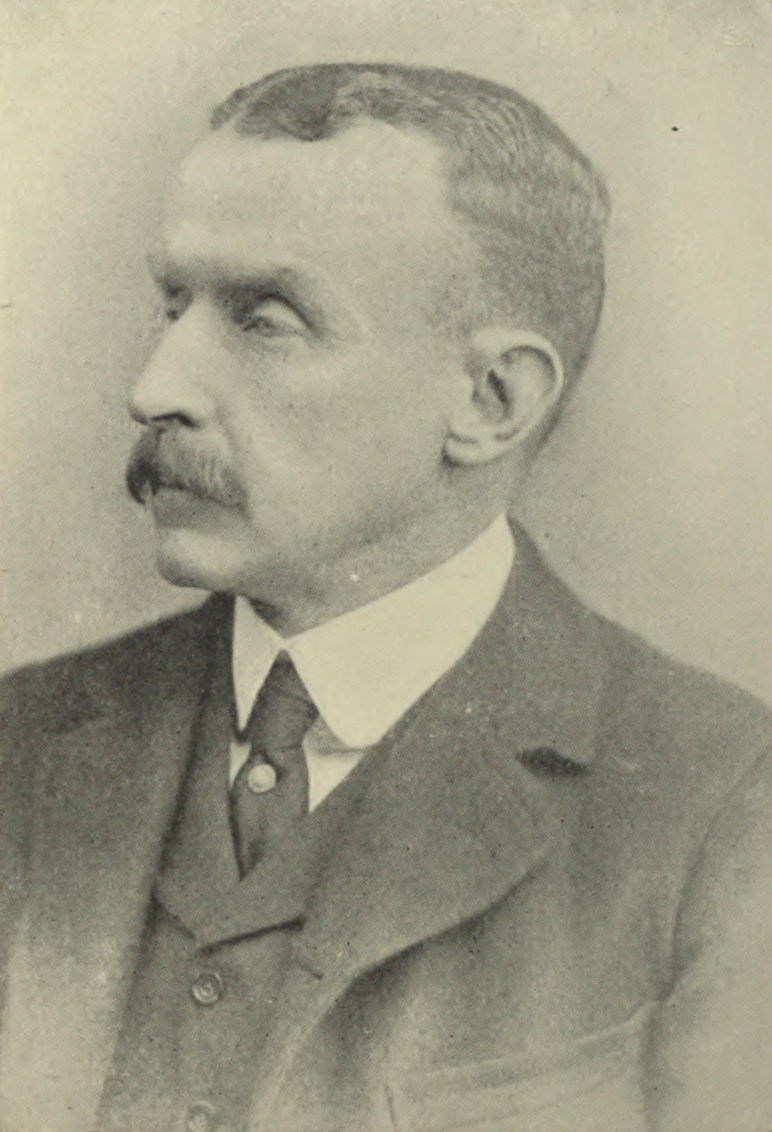

Under-Secretary of State for Public Works, Egypt
- In office 1892–1908

Personal details
- Born: William Edmund Garstin; 29 January 1849 British India
- Died: 8 January 1925 (aged 75) London, England

Sir William Edmund Garstin GCMG GBE (29 January 1849 – 8 January 1925) was a British civil engineer. He was responsible for a number of important hydrological and public works in Egypt.

Garstin was Under Secretary of State for Public Works in Egypt. He held this position during the construction of the Aswan Low Dam across the Nile 1898–1902. For his services to this project he was appointed a Knight Grand Cross of the Order of St Michael and St George (GCMG) in December 1902, and received the First class of the Ottoman Order of Osmanieh from the Khedive of Egypt. In early 1903 Garstin and a surveyor travelled the Lake Edward, the Semliki River and the Lake Albert, and visited Mombasa, Uganda, Gondokoro and Khartoum.

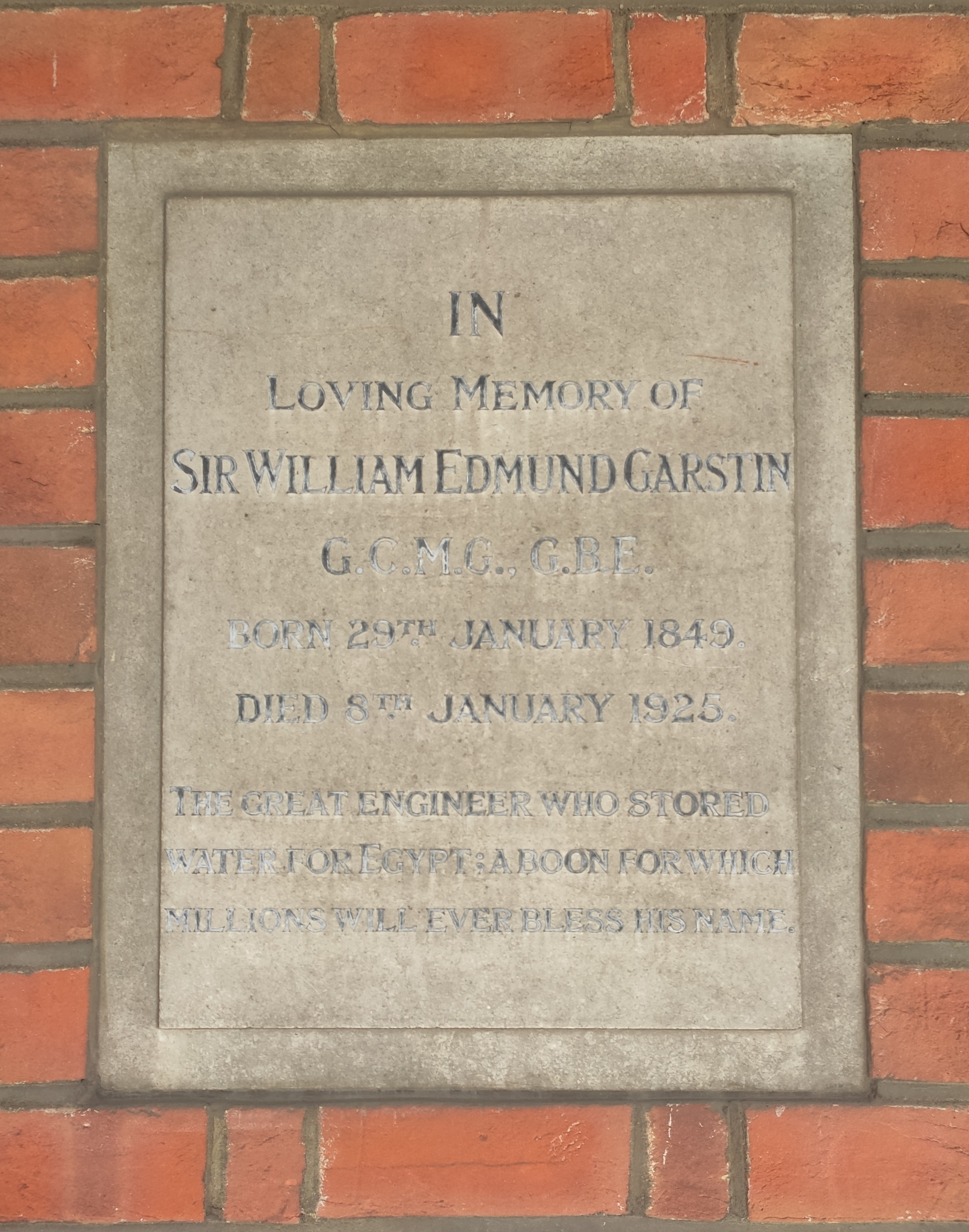
Plaque dedicated to Garstin at Golders Green Crematorium

After his death Garstin was cremated at Golders Green Crematorium.

The extinct giant snake Gigantophis garstini was named in his honour.
