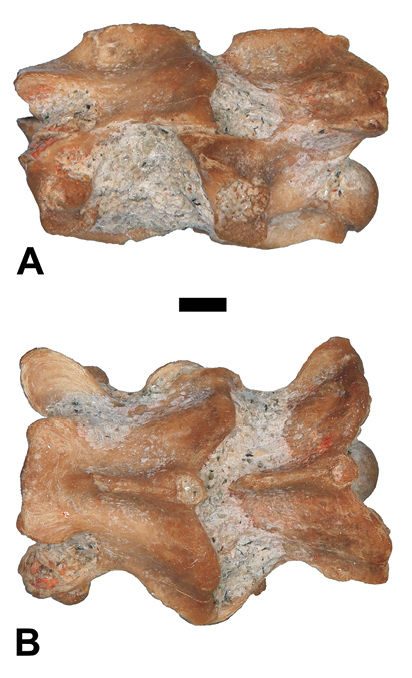
- Nidophis insularis vertebrae (scale bar 1 mm)

Scientific classification
- Kingdom: Animalia
- Phylum: Chordata
- Class: Reptilia
- Order: Squamata
- Family: †Madtsoiidae
- Genus: †Nidophis
- Species: †N. insularis

Binomial name
- †Nidophis insularis Vasile et al., 2013

= Nidophis =

Nidophis Temporal range: Maastrichtian

Extinct genus of snake

Nidophis is an extinct genus of madtsoiid snake that inhabited on Hațeg island in what is now Romania. The type and only known species of the genus is N. insularis. The holotype was closely associated with the dinosaur egg nest, though it may not have been a nest raider. Instead, Nidophis would have preyed upon small squamate eggs and small vertebrates.

== Discovery and naming ==
The holotype of Nidophis insularis is a well-preserved mid-trunk vertebra, with only the posterolateral margins of the left postzygapophysis broken off. The genus name Nidophis is a portmanteau of the Latin word nidus ("nest"), referring to its discovery associated with a dinosaur nest, and the Ancient Greek word ὄφις (ophis, "serpent"). The specific name insularis is a Latin word alluding to the probable island occurrence of this taxon.

== Paleoenvironment ==
The holotype of Nidophis insularis is found in the uppermost Cretaceous (Maastrichtian) continental deposits of the Hațeg Basin, western Romania. Today Haţeg is a landlocked town in Romania, but 70 million years ago during the late Cretaceous it was an island within a shallow sea that covered much of today's southern Europe.

Based upon the study of paleosols (fossilised soils) the climate is thought to have been sub-tropical with distinct wet and dry seasons, carbon isotopes indicate "dry woodland" conditions, and oxygen isotopes suggests a mean annual temperature of about 20-25 °C. Rainfall estimates differ according to whether they are based upon plant fossils or palaeosols. Palaeosols indicate that the climate had seasonal precipitation of less than 1000 mm/year, with greater evapotranspiration than precipitation and a fluctuating water table.
