= Naredi Formation =

Geologic formation in India

- Stratigraphic range: Eocene, 56–47.8 Ma
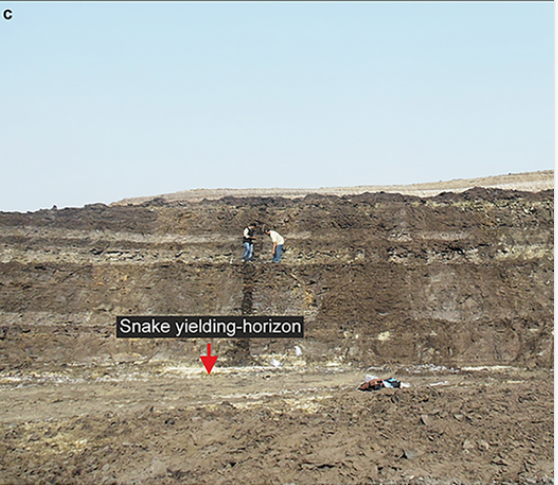
- Outcrop of the Naredi Formation at the Panadhro Lignite Mine
- Type: Geological formation

Location
- Coordinates: 25.3° N, 91.3° E
- Region: Gujarat
- Country: India
- Naredi Formation (India)

The Naredi Formation is a Cenozoic geologic formation in India. Remains of large snakes such as Vasuki are among the fossils that have been recovered from the formation, as well as other flora and fauna.

== Paleobiota ==
=== Mammals ===
Cetacea

Genus	Species	Location	Material	Notes	Images
Andrewsiphius	A. sloani			An early cetacean.	
Kutchicetus	K. minimus			An early cetacean.	

=== Reptiles ===
==== Pseudosuchians ====
Genus	Species	Location	Material	Notes	Images
Crocodilia	Indeterminate			A fragmentary Crocodilian.	

==== Snakes ====
Genus	Species	Location	Material	Notes	Images
Vasuki	V. indicus		Numerous vertebrae.	A madtsoiid snake.	
Nigerophiidae?	Indeterminate		Isolated vertebra.	A potential nigerophiid snake.	
Madtsoiidae	Indeterminate		Isolated vertebra.	Another large madtsoiid snake, the centrum length is 6.79 cm and width is 9.58 cm.	

==== Turtles ====
Genus	Species	Location	Material	Notes	Images
Testudines	Indeterminate			A turtle.	

=== Fishes ===
Genus	Species	Location	Material	Notes	Images
Siluriformes	Indeterminate			A catfish.	
Cylindracanthus	C. sp.		(PU/KTU-1) "Isolated rostrum."	A ray-finned fish	

=== Mollusca ===
Genus	Species	Location	Material	Notes	Images
Deltoidonautilus	D. vredenburgin			A nautiloid	
Caestocorbula	C. gujaratensis			A clam.	
Bicorbula	B. kutchensis			A clam.	
