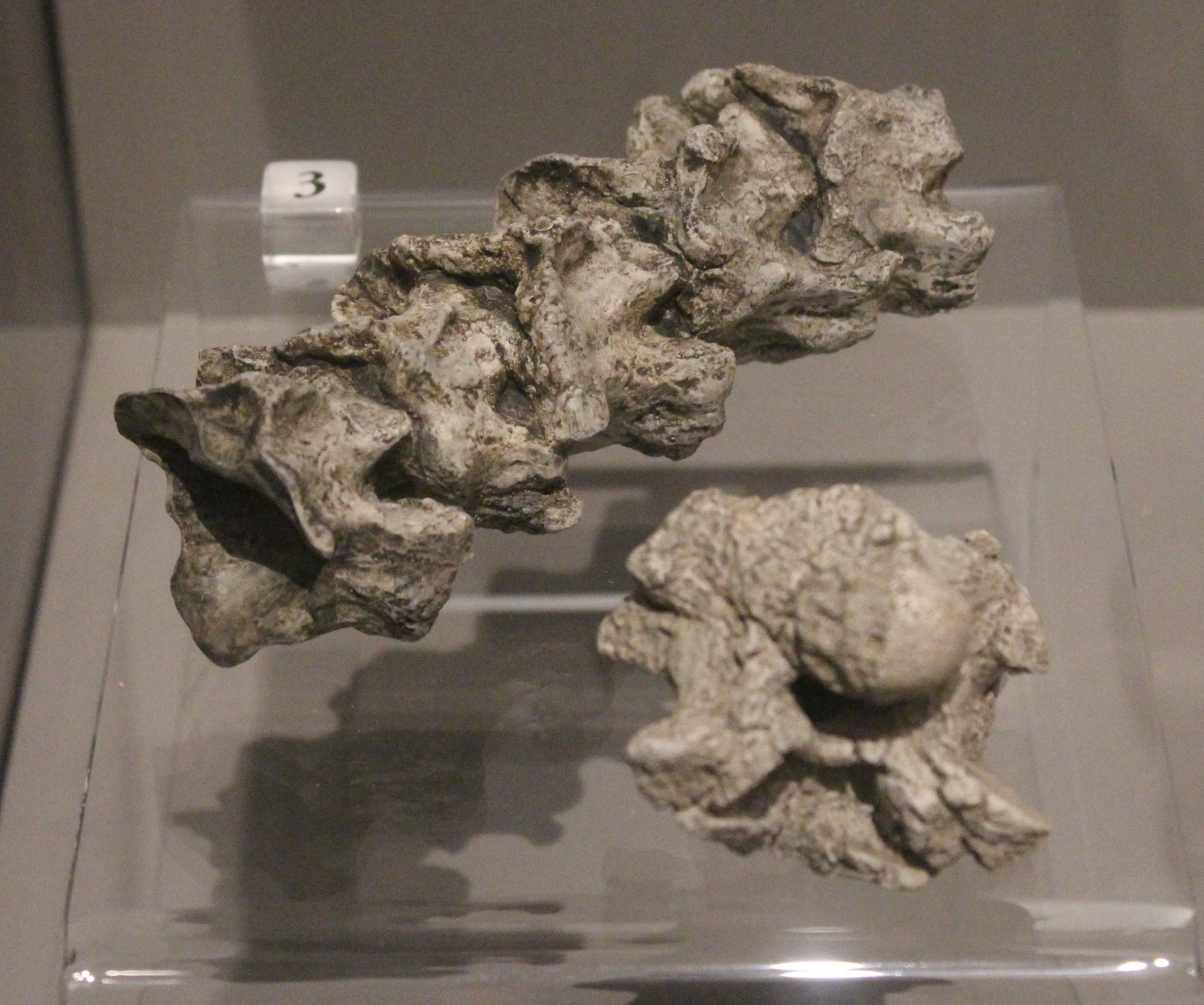
- Cast of vertebrae, University of Michigan Museum of Natural History

Scientific classification
- Kingdom: Animalia
- Phylum: Chordata
- Class: Reptilia
- Order: Squamata
- Family: †Madtsoiidae
- Genus: †Gigantophis
- Species: †G. garstini

Binomial name
- †Gigantophis garstini C. W. Andrews, 1901

= Gigantophis =

Gigantophis Temporal range: Priabonian, 37–35 Ma

Extinct genus of snakes

Gigantophis is an extinct genus of giant snake containing a single species, G. garstini. Before the Paleocene constrictor genus Titanoboa was described from Colombia in 2009, G. garstini was regarded as the largest snake ever recorded. It lived about 40 million years ago during the Eocene epoch of the Paleogene Period, in the Paratethys Sea, within the northern Sahara, where Egypt and Algeria are now located.

== Description ==
=== Size ===
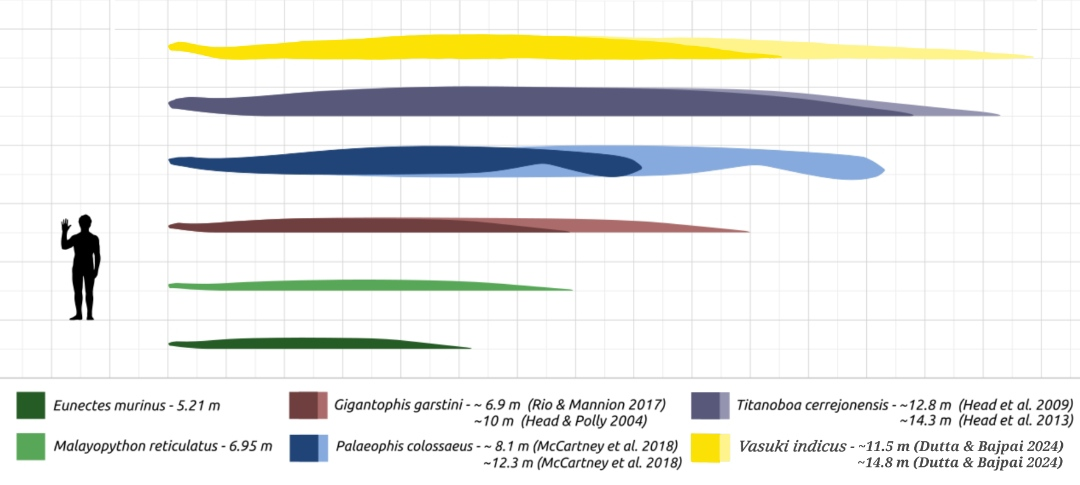
A diagram showing the estimated lengths of Gigantophis garstini (in red) compared to other large snakes

Jason Head, of the Smithsonian Institution in Washington, DC, has compared fossil Gigantophis garstini vertebrae to those of the largest modern snakes, and concluded that the extinct snake could grow from 9.3 to 10.7 m (30.5 to 35.1 ft) in length. If 10.7 m (35.1 ft), it would have been more than 10% longer than its largest living relatives.

Later estimates, based on allometric equations scaled from the articular processes of tail vertebrae referred to Gigantophis garstini, revised the length of Gigantophis garstini to 6.9 ± 0.3 metres (22.64 ± 0.98 ft), although the authors noted the estimate should be treated with caution.

== Discovery ==
The species is known only from a small number of fossils, mostly vertebrae.

Its discovery was published in 1901 by paleontologist Charles William Andrews, who described it, estimated its length to be about 30 feet, and named it garstini in honor of Sir William Garstin, KCMG, the Under Secretary of State for Public Works in Egypt. In 2013, vertebrae collected in Pakistan were found to be similar to Gigantophis vertebrae collected in Egypt, but their exact affinities are uncertain.

== Ecology ==
Gigantophis may have eaten proboscideans.

== Classification ==
Gigantophis garstini is classified as a member of the extinct family Madtsoiidae.

== See also ==
- List of largest snakes
