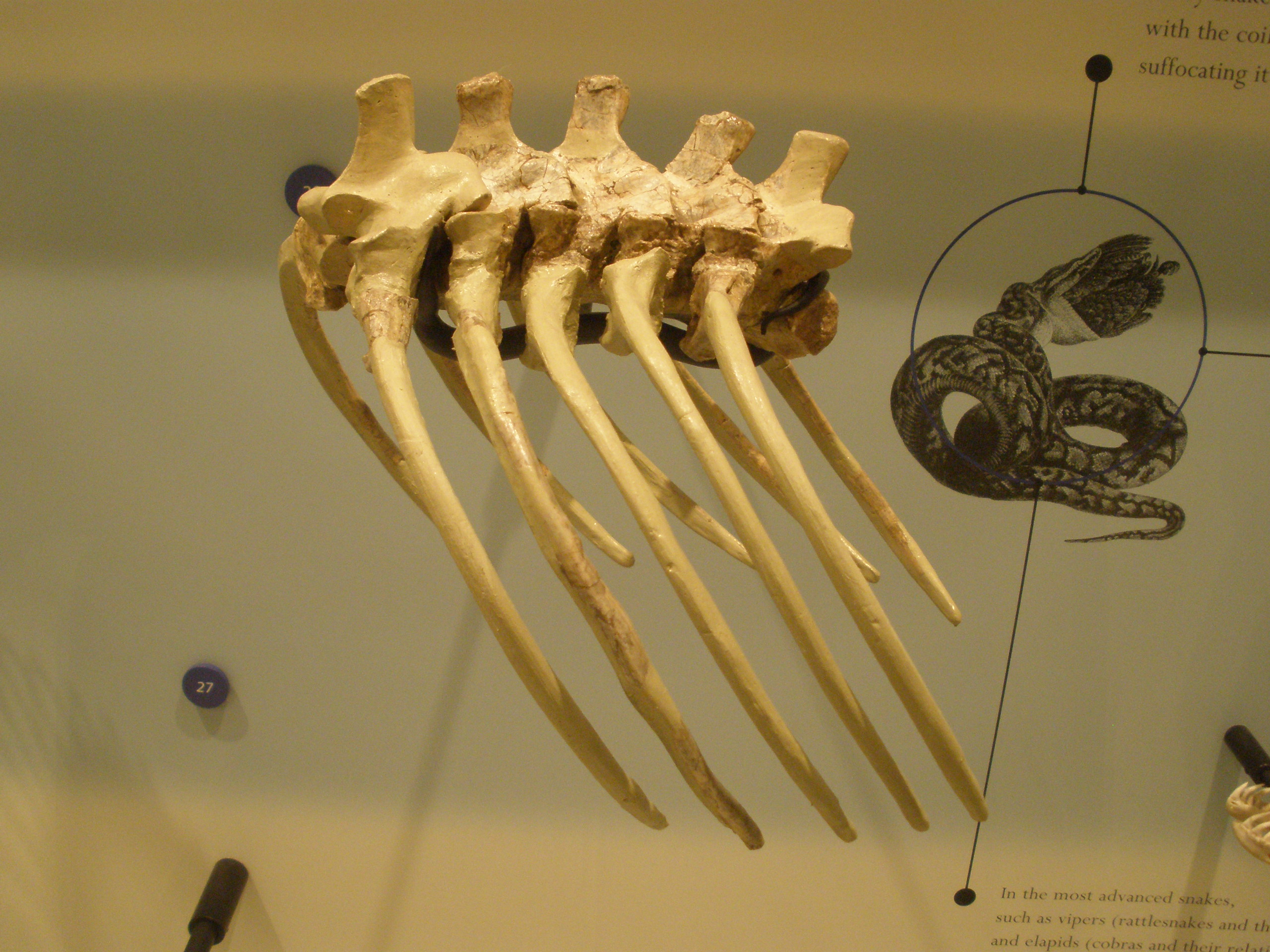
- Fossil specimen of Madtsoia bai

Scientific classification
- Kingdom: Animalia
- Phylum: Chordata
- Class: Reptilia
- Order: Squamata
- Clade: Ophidia
- Family: †Madtsoiidae; Hoffstetter, 1961

Genera
- †Adinophis; †Alamitophis; †Eomadtsoia; †Gigantophis; †Herensugea; †Madtsoia; †Menarana; †Nanowana; †Nidophis; †Patagoniophis; †Platyspondylophis; †Powellophis; †Rionegrophis; †Sanajeh; †Vasuki; †Wonambi; †Yurlunggur

= Madtsoiidae =

Madtsoiidae Temporal range: Early Cenomanian-Late Pleistocene ~98–0.012 Ma

Extinct family of snakes

Madtsoiidae is an extinct family of mostly Gondwanan snakes with a fossil record extending from early Cenomanian (Upper Cretaceous) to late Pleistocene strata located in South America, Africa, India, Australia and Southern Europe. Although madtsoiids largely went extinct during the Eocene, some species persisted in South America and India through the Oligocene, and Australian madtsoiids were extant until the Pleistocene, being the last relicts of the family.

Madtsoiidae include very primitive snakes, which like extant boas and pythons would likely dispatch their prey by constriction. Genera include some of the longest snakes known, such as Vasuki indicus which measured at least 11–15 metres (36–49 ft) long, and the Australian Wonambi and Yurlunggur. As a grouping of basal forms, the composition and even the validity of Madtsoiidae is in a state of flux: as new pertinent finds are described, it is increasingly suggested that the family is paraphyletic or polyphyletic as previously defined.

== Description ==
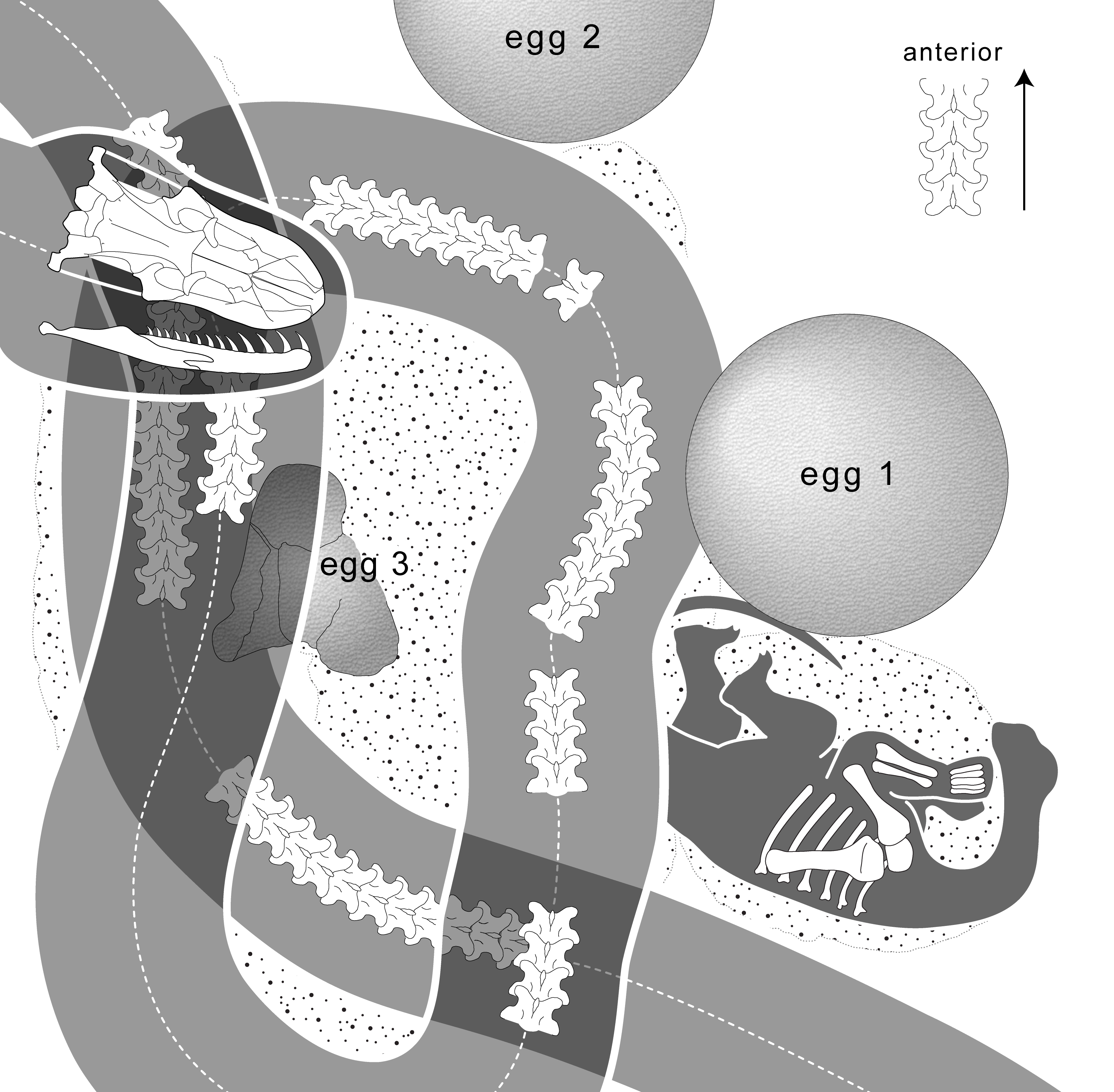
Diagram of the fossil of Sanajeh

Madtsoiidae was first classified as a subfamily of Boidae, Madtsoiinae, in Hoffstetter (1961). Further study and new finds allowed ranking the group as a distinct family in Linnaean systems. With the recent use of cladistics to unravel phylogeny, various analyses have posited Madtsoiidae as a likely clade within Serpentes, or possible paraphyletic stem group outside Serpentes and within a more inclusive Ophidia. Madtsoiid snakes ranged in size from less than 1 metre (3.3 ft) (estimated total length) to over 11 metres (36 ft), and are thought to have been constrictors analogous to modern pythons and boas, but with more primitive jaw structures less highly adapted for swallowing large prey. There are specific anatomical features that diagnose members of this family, such as the presence of hypapophyses only in anterior trunk, that the middle and posterior trunk vertebrae possess a moderately or well-developed haemal keel, except for a few near the cloacal region, often with short laterally paired projections on the posterior part of the keel. Also, all trunk and caudal vertebrae have at least a parazygantral foramen, sometimes several of them, located in a more or less distinct fossa that is lateral to each zygantral facet. Additional features are the prezygapophyseal processes' absence while the paracotylar foramina are present and that the diapophyses are relatively wide, exceeding width across prezygapophyses at least in the posterior trunk vertebrae. (Scanlon 2005)

Like most fossil snakes the majority of madtsoiids are known only from isolated vertebrae, but several (Madtsoia bai, M. camposi, Wonambi naracoortensis, Nanowana spp., unnamed Yurlunggur spp., Najash rionegrina) have associated or articulated parts of skeletons. Of the genera listed below, all have been referred to Madtsoiidae in all recent classifications except Najash rionegrina, which is included here based on diagnostic vertebral characters described by Apesteguía and Zaher (2006). These authors didn't include Najash among madtsoiids because they consider that madtsoiids are a paraphyletic assemblage of basal macrostomatans related to Madtsoia bai and consequently, not related to the Cretaceous alethinophidians from southern continents.

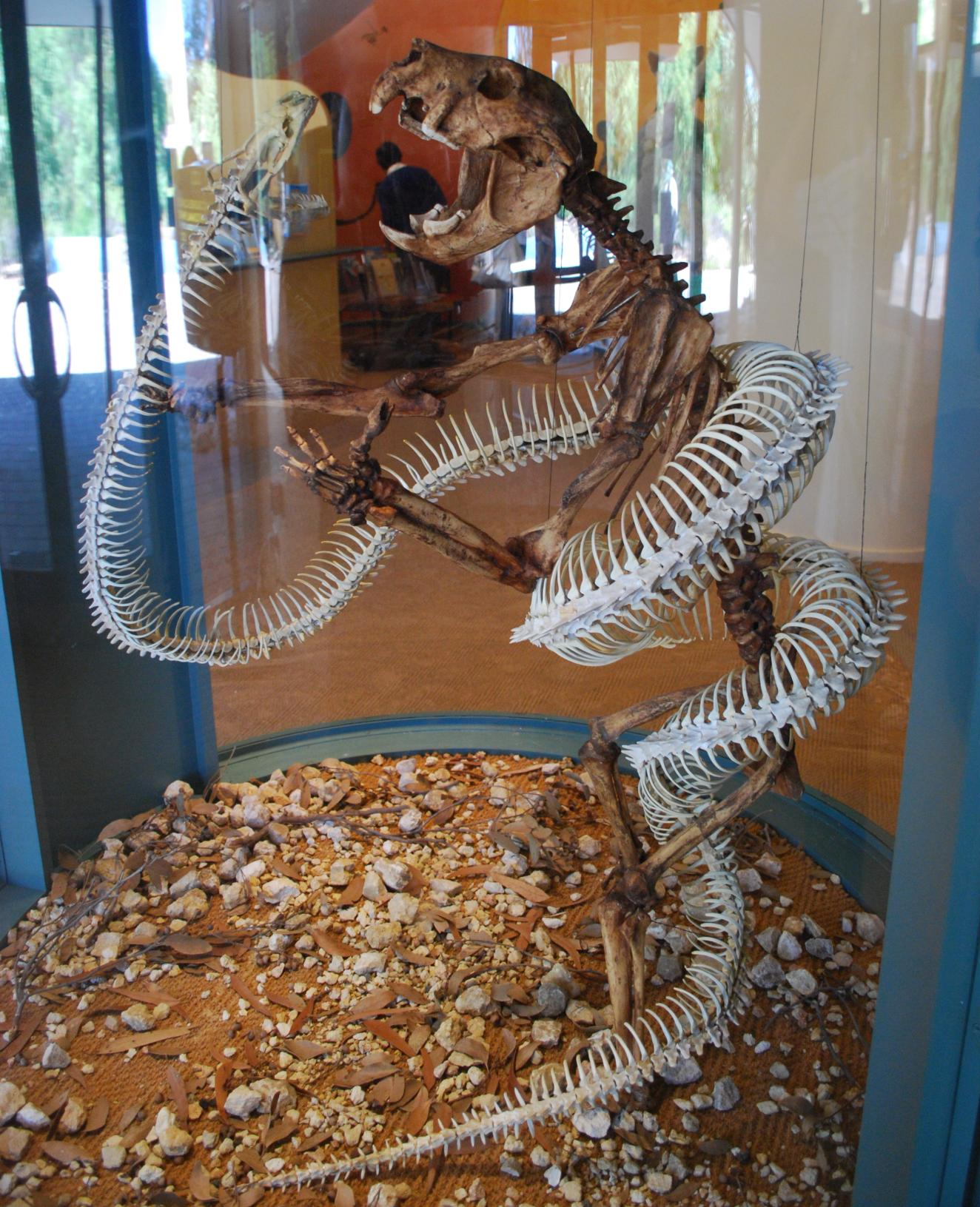
Wonambi naracoortensis and Thylacoleo

Rieppel et al. (2002) classified Wonambi naracoortensis within the extant radiation (crown group) of snakes as Macrostomata incertae sedis, but many of their character state attributions for this species have been criticised or refuted by Scanlon (2005) and the better-preserved skulls of Yurlunggur sp./spp. have numerous characters apparently more plesiomorphic than any macrostomatans (Scanlon, 2006). The partial skull attributed to Najash rionegrina (Apesteguía and Zaher 2006) resembles that of the non-madtsoiid Dinilysia patagonica, and vertebrae support that they are related. The type material of Najash is the only possible madtsoiid specimen retaining evidence of pelvic and hindlimb elements, which are claimed to be more plesiomorphic than other Cretaceous limbed snakes, such as Pachyrhachis, Haasiophis or Eupodophis, in retaining a sacro-iliac contact and well-developed limbs, with a huge and well-defined trochanter. The sacro iliac contact is perhaps misleadingly described by Apesteguía and Zaher as unique possession of a sacrum, whereas it has rarely been questioned that the cloacal vertebrae in snakes are homologous to the sacrals of limbed squamates (i.e. the sacrum is present but has lost contact with the reduced ilia in other taxa). It would be unsurprising if other madtsoiids also possessed hindlimbs as complete as those of Najash.

Several madtsoiid genera have been named using indigenous words for legendary Rainbow Serpents or dragons, including Wonambi (Pitjantjatjara), Yurlunggur (Yolngu) and Nanowana (Ancient Greek nano-, 'dwarf' + Warlpiri Wana) in Australia, and Herensugea (Basque) in Europe. G.G. Simpson (1933) apparently started this trend by compounding Madtsoia from indigenous roots. In this particular case these originated from the Tehuelche language, although the reference made was geographic rather than mythological, the derivation being from that language's terms mad, "valley" and tsoi, "cow" as a rough translation from Spanish name of the type locality, Cañadón Vaca.

A 2022 morphological study found Madtsoiidae to be polyphyletic, with Sanajeh being found to be the most basal member of the Ophidia, whereas the Cenozoic Australian madtsoiids were basal alethinophidians.

== Classification ==
- Gigantophis Andrews, 1901
  - Gigantophis garstini Andrews, 1901 (Andrews, 1906; Hoffstetter, 1961b; Paleogene, Late Eocene; Egypt (Birket Qarun and Qasr el-Sagha Formations), Libya)
- Madtsoia Simpson, 1933
  - Madtsoia bai Simpson, 1933 (Paleogene, Early Eocene Sarmiento Formation; Argentina)
  - Madtsoia cf. M. bai (Simpson, 1935; Hoffstetter, 1960; Paleogene, Late Paleocene Las Flores Formation; Argentina)
  - Madtsoia madagascariensis Hoffstetter, 1961a (Piveteau, 1933; Cretaceous, Maastrichtian Maevarano Formation; Madagascar)
  - Madtsoia aff. madagascariensis (de Broin et al., 1974; Cretaceous, Coniacian or Santonian In Beceten Formation, Niger)
  - Madtsoia camposi Rage, 1998 (Paleogene, middle Paleocene Itaboraí Formation; Brazil)
  - Madtsoia pisdurensis Mohabey et al, 2011 (Cretaceous, Maastrichtian Lameta Formation; India)
- Wonambi Smith, 1976
  - Wonambi naracoortensis Smith, 1976 (Scanlon and Lee, 2000; Scanlon, 2005; Neogene, Pliocene to Pleistocene; Australia)
  - Wonambi barriei Scanlon in Scanlon and Lee, 2000 (Neogene, early Miocene; Australia)
- Patagoniophis Albino, 1986
  - Patagoniophis parvus Albino, 1986 (Cretaceous, Campanian or Maastrichtian Los Alamitos Formation; Argentina)
  - Patagoniophis australiensis Scanlon, 2005 (Scanlon, 1993; Paleogene, early Eocene; Australia)
- Alamitophis Albino, 1986
  - Alamitophis argentinus Albino, 1986 (Cretaceous, Campanian or Maastrichtian Los Alamitos and La Colonia Formations; Argentina)
  - Alamitophis elongatus Albino, 1994 (Cretaceous, Campanian or Maastrichtian Allen Formation; Argentina)
  - Alamitophis tingamarra Scanlon, 2005 (Scanlon, 1993; Paleogene, early Eocene; Australia)
- Rionegrophis Albino, 1986
  - Rionegrophis madtsoioides Albino, 1986 (Cretaceous, Campanian or Maastrichtian Los Alamitos Formation; Argentina)
- Yurlunggur Scanlon, 1992
  - Yurlunggur camfieldensis Scanlon, 1992 (Neogene, middle Miocene Bullock Creek (Northern Territory); Australia)
  - Yurlunggur spp. (Scanlon, 2004; 2006; Paleogene-Neogene, Oligocene to Miocene; Australia)
- Herensugea Rage, 1996
  - Herensugea caristiorum Rage, 1996 (Cretaceous, Campanian or Maastrichtian Vitoria Formation; Spain)
- Nanowana Scanlon, 1997
  - Nanowana godthelpi Scanlon, 1997 (Neogene, early-to-middle Miocene Australian Fossil Mammal Sites (Riversleigh); Australia)
  - Nanowana schrenki Scanlon, 1997 (Neogene, early-to-middle Miocene; Australia)
- Sanajeh Wilson et al., 2010
  - Sanajeh indicus Wilson et al., 2010 (Cretaceous, Maastrichtian Lameta Formation; India)
- Menarana Laduke et al., 2010
  - Menarana nosymena Laduke et al., 2010 (Late Cretaceous, Maastrichtian Maevarano Formation; Madagascar)
  - Menarana laurasiae Rage, 1996 (Astibia et al., 1990; Cretaceous, Campanian or Maastrichtian; Spain)
- Nidophis Vasile et al., 2013
  - Nidophis insularis Vasile et al., 2013 (Late Cretaceous, Maastrichtian Densus-Ciula Formation; Romania)
- Adinophis Pritchard et al., 2014
  - Adinophis fisaka Pritchard et al., 2014 (Late Cretaceous, Maastrichtian Maevarano Formation; Madagascar)
- Platyspondylophis Smith et al., 2016
  - Platyspondylophis tadkeshwarensis Smith et al., 2016 (Paleogene, Eocene Cambay Shale; India)
- Eomadtsoia Gómez et al., 2019
  - Eomadtsoia ragei Gómez et al., 2019 (Cretaceous, Maastrichtian La Colonia Formation; Argentina)
- Powellophis Garberoglio et al., 2022
  - Powellophis andina Garberoglio et al., 2022 (Paleogene, Paleocene Mealla Formation; Argentina)
- Vasuki Datta & Bajpai, 2024
  - Vasuki indicus Datta & Bajpai, 2024 (Paleogene, Eocene Naredi Formation; India)

=== Unnamed specimens ===
- Madtsoiidae indet. (Rage, 1987; Paleogene, Paleocene; Morocco)
- Madtsoiidae indet. (Werner and Rage, 1994, Rage and Werner 1999; Cretaceous, Cenomanian; Sudan)
- ?Madtsoiid (Rage and Prasad, 1992; Cretaceous, Maastrichtian; India)
- ?Madtsoiid (Rage, 1991; Paleogene, early Paleocene Santa Lucía Formation; Bolivia)
- ?Madtsoiidae indet. cf. Madtsoia sp. (Scanlon, 2005; Paleogene, early Eocene; Australia)
- Madtsoiidae indet. (Folie and Codrea, 2005; Cretaceous, Maastrichtian; Romania)
- Madtsoiidae nov. (Gomez and Baez, 2006; Cretaceous, late Campanian or early Maastrichtian; Argentina)
- Madtsoiidae indet. (Wazir et al., 2022; Late-Oligocene, India)

=== Phylogeny ===
According to a cladistic analysis by Scanlon (2006), Wonambi and Yurlunggur as representative genera of Madtsoiidae form a monophyletic assembly. However, as Madtsoia is not included, its grouping in the same family is questionable.

- unnamed
  - Pachyrhachis†
  - unnamed
    - Haasiophis†
    - unnamed
      - unnamed
        - Wonambi†
        - Yurlunggur†
      - unnamed
        - Dinilysia†
        - unnamed
          - Scolecophidia
          - Alethinophidia
