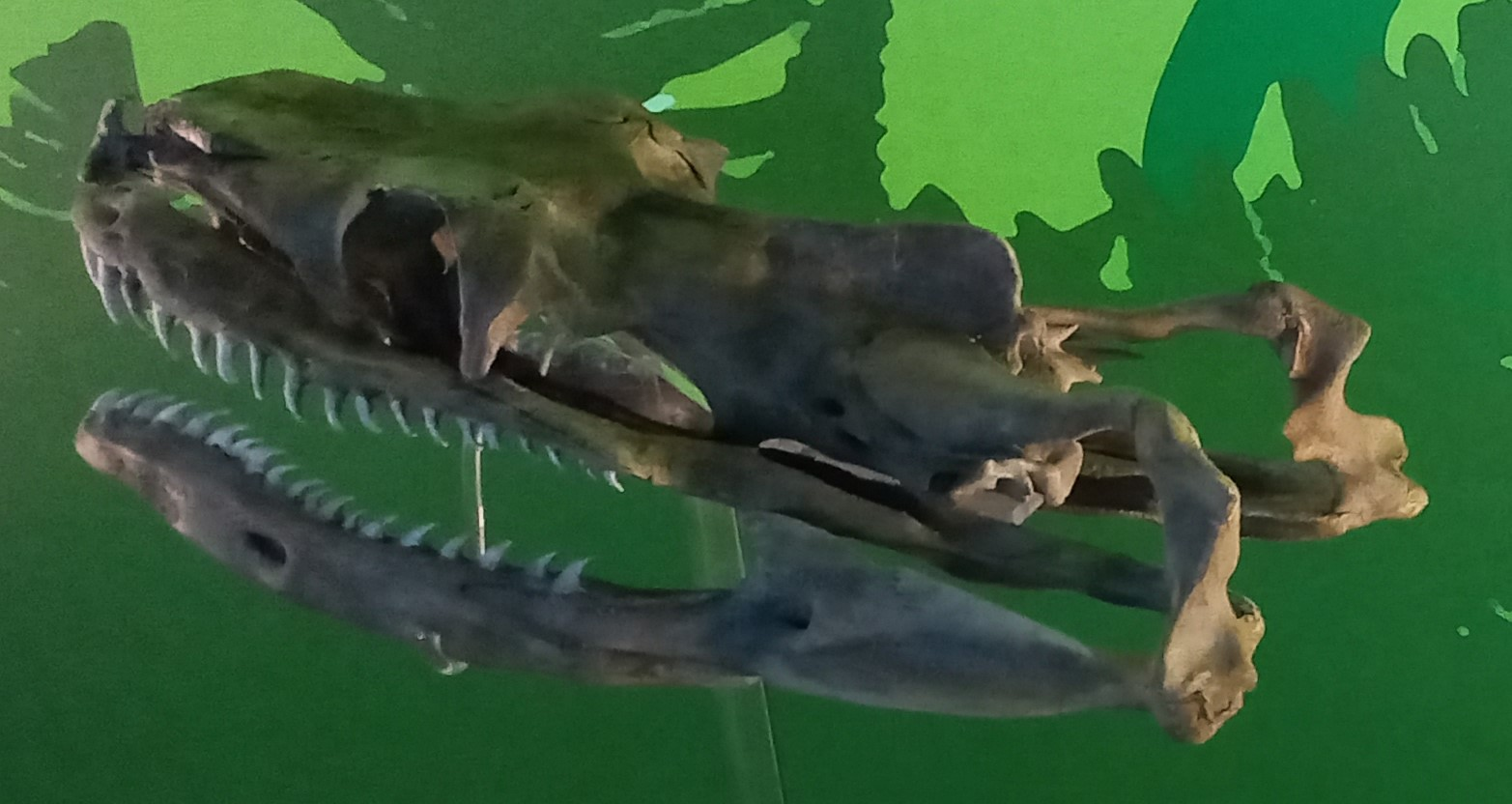
- Reconstructed skull of M. bai

Scientific classification
- Kingdom: Animalia
- Phylum: Chordata
- Class: Reptilia
- Order: Squamata
- Family: †Madtsoiidae
- Genus: †Madtsoia; Simpson, 1933

Species
- M. bai Simpson, 1933 (type); M. camposi Rage, 1998; M. madagascariensis Hoffstetter, 1961; M. pisdurensis Mohabey et al, 2011

= Madtsoia =

Madtsoia Temporal range: Maastrichtian–Eocene Possible Coniacian/Santonian and Late Oligocene records

Extinct genus of snakes

Madtsoia is an extinct genus of madtsoiid snakes. It is known from the Eocene of Argentina (M. bai), the Paleocene of Brazil (M. camposi), the Late Cretaceous (Maastrichtian) of India (M. pisdurensis), and the Late Cretaceous (Maastrichtian) of Madagascar (M. madagascariensis). The type species (M. bai) was the largest with an estimated length of 9–10 m (30–33 ft), and the other three species were smaller. A 5.1 m (17 ft) long M. madagascariensis would have weighed 50 kg (110 lb), but an isolated specimen suggests that this species reached 8 m (26 ft) in maximum length. Juvenile Madtsoia madagascariensis may have eaten a wide array of small vertebrates, while adults likely ate a narrower range of larger taxa. Possible prey for adult M. madagascariensis would have included medium-sized crocodyliforms (e.g., adult Simosuchus clarki, subadult Mahajangasuchus insignis) as well as small theropod dinosaurs (e.g., adult Masiakasaurus knopfleri, subadult Majungasaurus crenatissimus), though such large prey would have caused injuries for the snake. In the Sarmiento Formation of Argentina, Madtsoia would have frequently eaten the more varied and abundant mammals of larger size. Madtsoia likely killed its prey by constriction.

Madtsoia length estimates
| Species | Length |
|---|---|
| M. bai | 9–10 m (30–33 ft) |
| M. camposi | 5–6 m (16–20 ft) |
| M. madagascariensis | 5.1–8 m (17–26 ft) |
| M. pisdurensis | 5 m (16 ft) |

== Distribution ==
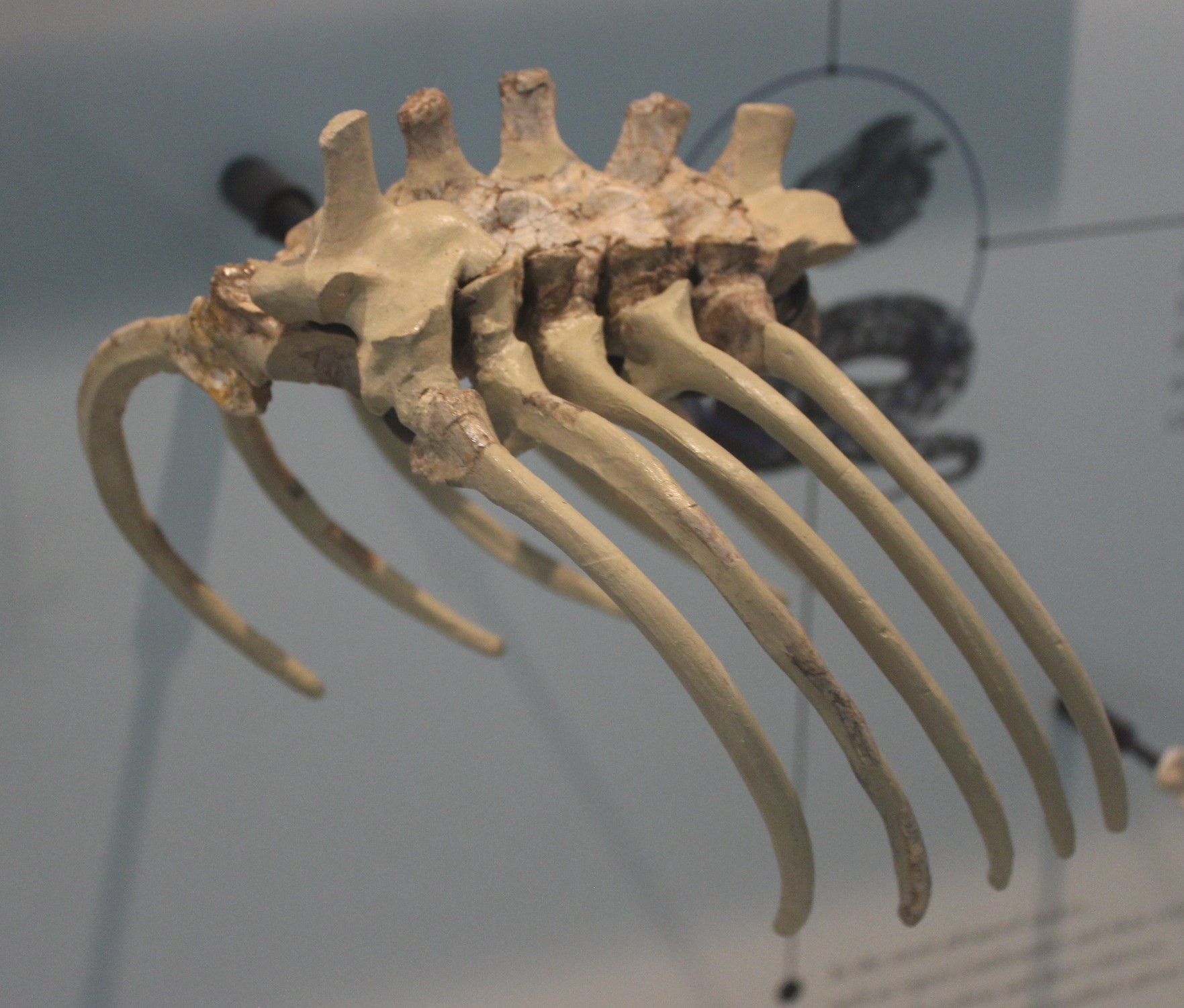
Holotype of M. bai (AMNH 3154), American Museum of Natural History

Fossils of Madtsoia have been found in:

Coniacian

- In Beceten Formation, Niger

Campanian

- Laño, Spain

Late Cretaceous (Maastrichtian)

- Lameta Formation, India
- Maevarano Formation, Madagascar

Eocene

- Casamayoran Sarmiento Formation, Argentina
- Itaboraian Las Flores Formation, Argentina and Itaboraí Formation, Brazil
