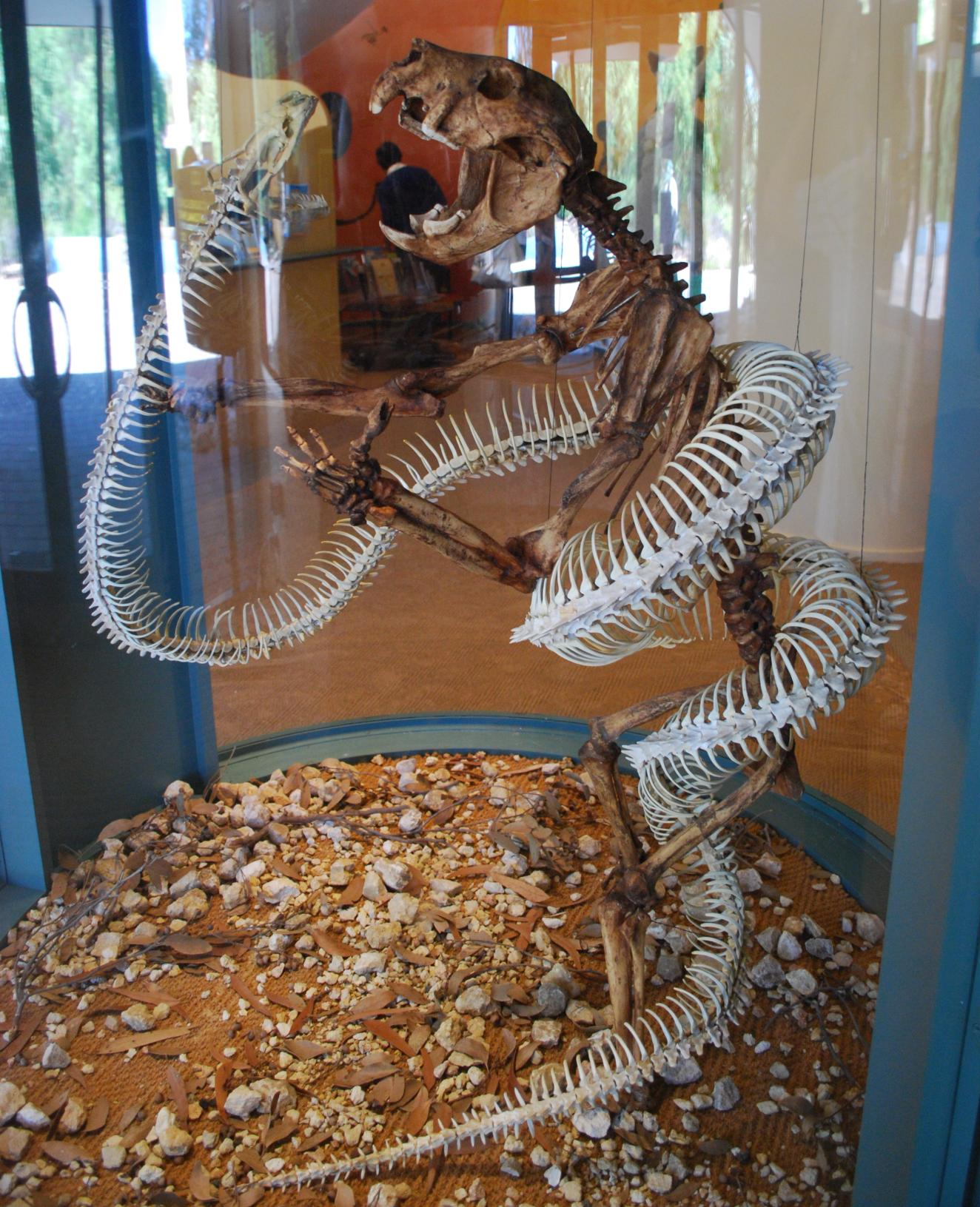
- Wonambi naracoortensis and Thylacoleo

Scientific classification
- Kingdom: Animalia
- Phylum: Chordata
- Class: Reptilia
- Order: Squamata
- Family: †Madtsoiidae
- Genus: †Wonambi

Type species
- Wonambi naracoortensis Smith, 1976

Species
- †Wonambi barriei Scanlon, 2000 †Wonambi naracoortensis Smith, 1976

= Wonambi =

Wonambi Temporal range: Miocene-Pleistocene 23.03–0.012 Ma

Extinct genus of snakes

Wonambi is an extinct genus of madtsoiid snakes that lived in late Neogene to late Quaternary Australia. Species of Wonambi were constrictor snakes unrelated to Australian pythons.

== Taxonomy and naming ==
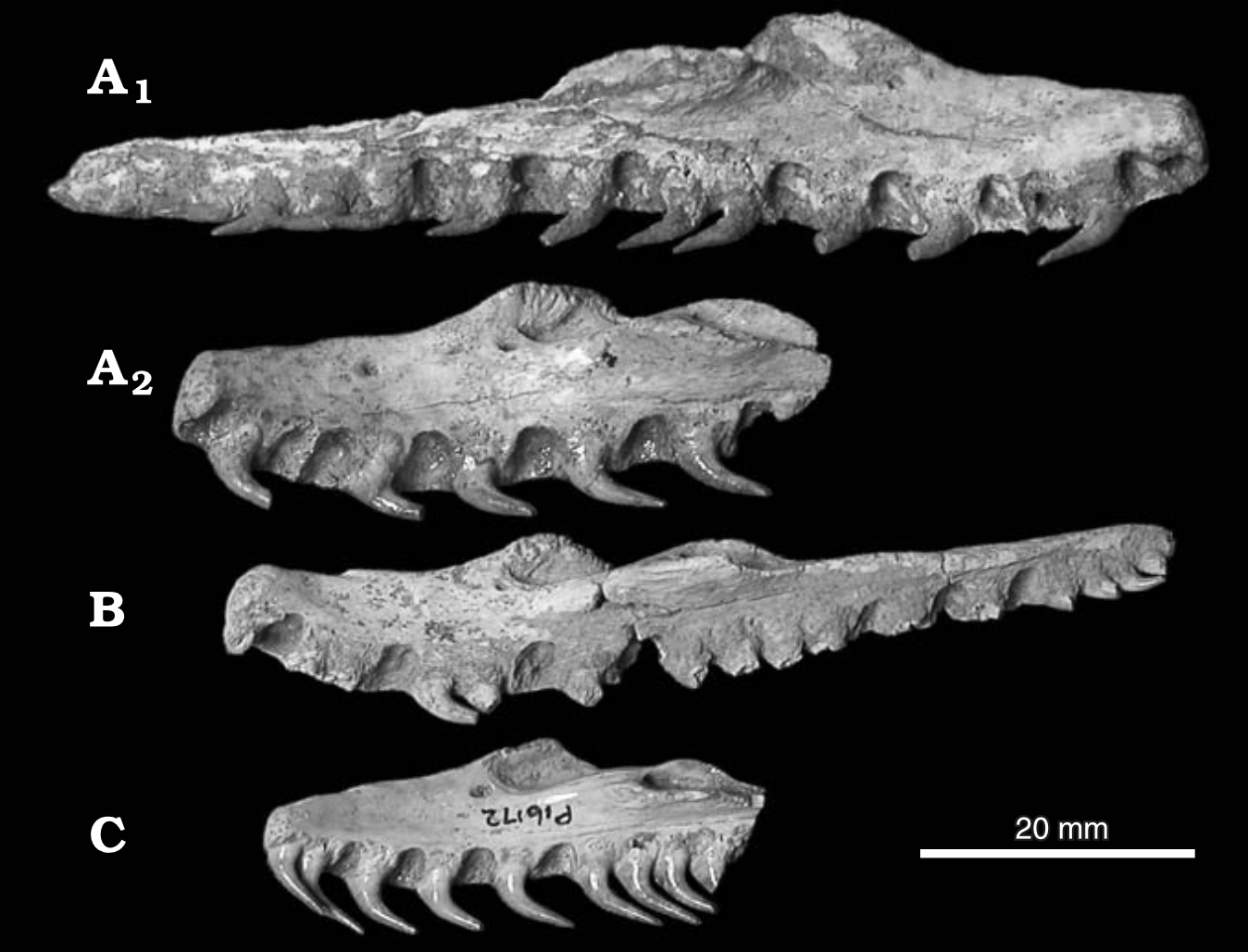
Maxillae

Wonambi naracoortensis was first described from fossils collected at Naracoorte, South Australia, the first extinct snake to be found in Australia.

It was given the name Wonambi from the description, by the local Aboriginal people, of a serpent of the Dreamtime. This serpent, a mythological being commonly referred to by both Aboriginal people and Europeans as the Rainbow Serpent, was often held responsible for the creation of major features of the landscape. The Wagyl of the Western Australian Noongar people is thought to correlate to the South Australian people's Wonambi. It is cognate with the genus Yurlunggur, found at Riversleigh in Queensland and in the Northern Territory. The shorter species, W. barriei, was named in honour of David John Barrie, who collected and prepared most of the material for W. naracoortensis.

The family of this species, Madtsoiidae, became extinct in other parts of the world around 55 million years ago, but new species continued to evolve in Australia. These species are the last known to have existed, becoming extinct in the last 50,000 years.

== Description ==
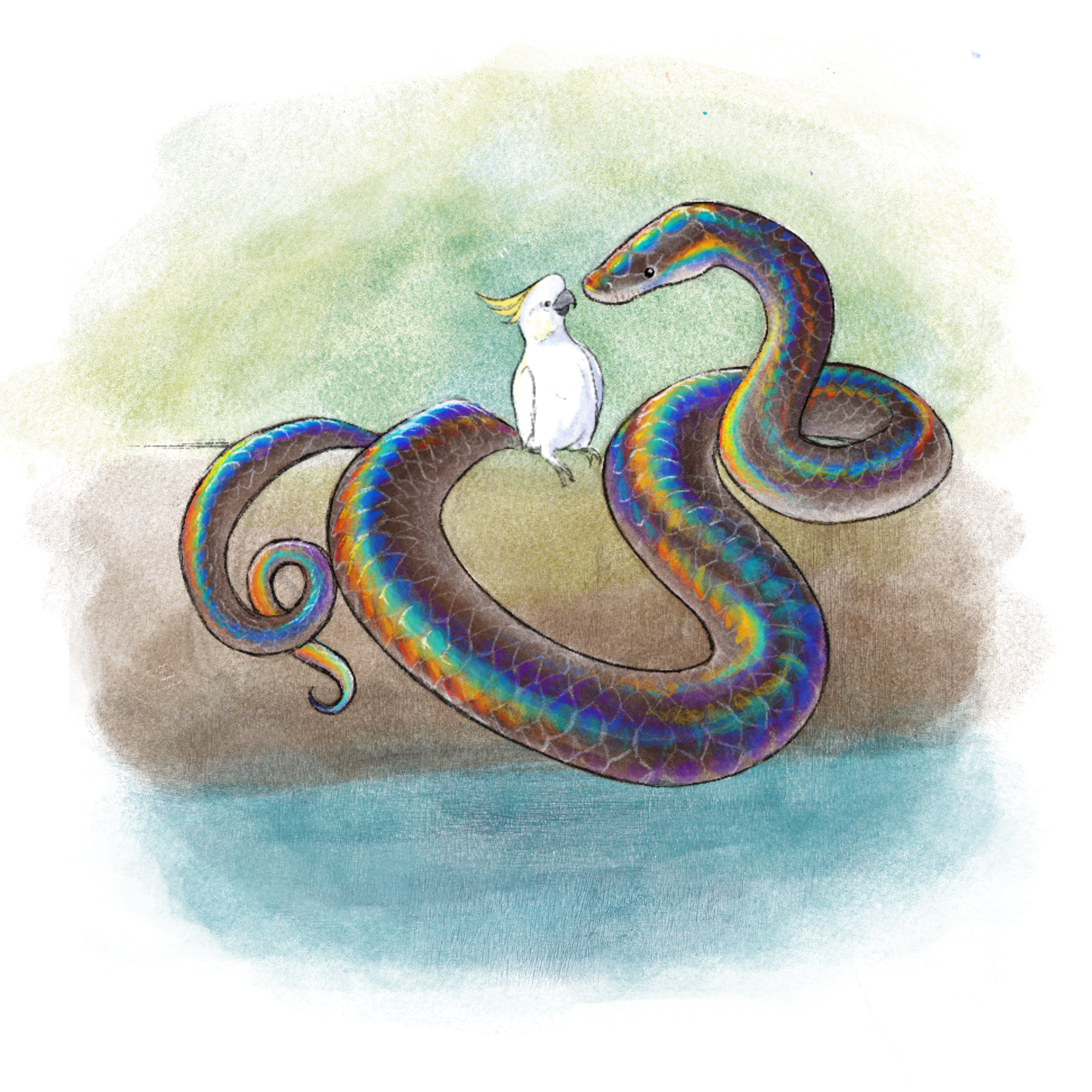
Paleoart rendering of Wonambi naracoortensis

Wonambi was a fairly large snake, with the type species (W. naracoortensis) exceeding 4–6 m (13–20 ft) long and the other species (W. barriei) reaching less than 3 m (9.8 ft) long. It was a non-venomous, constrictor snake, and may have been an ambush predator that killed its prey by constriction. The head of the animal was small, restricting the size of its prey.

== Paleoecology ==
Wonambi naracoortensis lived during the Pleistocene, living in relatively cool and arid regions of Australia. It is believed they would have dwelt in natural sun-traps beside local waterholes, where they would ambush kangaroo, wallaby and other prey coming to the water to drink. Mapping such locations in Western Australia, has been found to be closely associated with areas the Noongar people regard as Waugal sacred sites.

Tim Flannery claims that this animal, along with other Australian megafauna, became extinct (partly) as a result of activities of Aboriginal Australians (for example, hunting and firestick farming).

== See also ==
- Australian megafauna
