= Yurlunggur =

Yurlunggur Temporal range: Oligocene-Miocene, 23.03–11.608 Ma

Scientific classification
- Kingdom: Animalia
- Phylum: Chordata
- Class: Reptilia
- Order: Squamata
- Family: †Madtsoiidae
- Genus: †Yurlunggur; Scanlon, 1992
- Species: †Y. camfieldensis

Binomial name
- †Yurlunggur camfieldensis Scanlon, 1992

Genus of snakes

Yurlunggur is a genus of fossil snake in the extinct family Madtsoiidae containing the species Yurlunggur camfieldensis known from the Oligocene and Miocene of Australia.

Y. camfieldensis was a large apex predator that typically reached 4.5–6 m (15–20 ft) in length, with one vertebra from the Wyandotte Creek suggesting a maximum length of 7–8 m (23–26 ft). It is closely related to Wonambi naracoortensis, present in Australia during the Pleistocene.

The name of the genus is derived from traditional name given by the people of Arnhem Land to the Rainbow serpent. They closely resemble Varanus (monitors) more than small burrowing lizards. John Scanlon has presented this as evidence of descent from the former, rather than burrowing ancestors that evolved into the elongate and legless snakes. The fossil material described by this species includes a rare example of a complete skull and mandible, often crushed in the fossilisation process, that was preserved in the soft limestone of a body of fresh water. This was found at the Riversleigh fossil site in northwest Queensland.

In 2018, researchers have suggested that this genus was a fossorial or semi-fossorial animal.
