= List of Testudines families =

There are fourteen extant families of the order Testudines, an order of reptile. The testudines are some of the most ancient reptiles alive, with only the tuataras considered more primitive. There are approximately 300 extant species and 97 genera of testudines, split into two suborders: the Cryptodirans and the Pleurodirans. The distinction between these two suborders is based on the mode in which they cover their head and neck. The Pleurodirans, also called the side-necked turtles, have long necks, and fold them sideways to align them with the shell. The Pelomedusidae and Chelidae are the only extant families of pleurodires. The Cryptodirans pull their neck straight back to conceal their head within the shell. The Carettochelyidae, Cheloniidae, Chelydridae, Dermatemydidae, Dermochelyidae, Emydidae, Kinosternidae, Testudinidae and Trionychidae are all cryptodires, although the ability to retract the head has been lost in the sea turtles (Cheloniidae and Dermochelyidae). A third order, the Paracryptodirans, are extinct.

Reptiles are classified according to the pattern of fenestration in the temporal region of the skull. Testudines are placed in the subclass Anapsida because they lack fenestration. There are suggestions that this lack of fenestration is a secondary characteristic and that turtles belong in Diapsida. Both sides cite strong evidence, and the conflict has yet to be resolved. The shell of testudines distinguishes them from other vertebrates. The shell is not an exoskeleton, but a modified ribcage and part of the vertebral column. Because of the shell, the pectoral and pelvic girdles are located within the ribcage. The limb bones are also modified to accommodate to the shell.

The earliest known turtles are from fossils in the Upper Triassic. These fossils are nearly indistinguishable from modern turtles anatomically. In these early fossils (mostly of the genus Proganochelys), the teeth have already been lost, and a keratin beak is suggested by the mandibles. Important differences between Proganochelys and modern turtles are the presence of the palatal teeth (lost in modern species), the inability to retract the head within the shell, and the lack of a trochlear pulley in the jaw closing anatomy.

== Families ==
The following lists the family—the Latin name of the family, date in which the species was formally described and classified, and the binomial authority on the species; the number of genera belonging to the family; the name or names commonly used; an example species and an example image.

Cryptodira – 11 families, 74 genera, over 200 species
| Family | Genera | Common name(s) | Example species | Example image |
| Carettochelyidae; Boulenger, 1887 | 1 | Pig-nosed turtle | Pig-nosed turtle (Carettochelys insculpta) | |
| Cheloniidae; Oppel, 1811 | 6 | Sea turtles | Green sea turtle (Chelonia mydas) | |
| Chelydridae; Gray, 1831 | 2 | Snapping turtles | Alligator snapping turtle (Macrochelys temminckii) | |
| Dermatemydidae; Gray, 1870 | 1 | Central American river turtle | Central American river turtle (Dermatemys mawii) | |
| Dermochelyidae; Fitzinger, 1843 | 1 | Leatherback sea turtle | Leatherback sea turtle (Dermochelys coriacea) | |
| Emydidae; Rafinesque, 1815 | 12 | Pond turtles, terrapins, and sliders | Red-eared slider (Trachemys scripta elegans) | |
| Geoemydidae; Theobald, 1868 | 24 | Asian leaf turtles, roofed turtles, and Asian box turtles | Amboina box turtle (Cuora amboinensis) | |
| Kinosternidae; Agassiz, 1857 | 4 | Mud and musk turtles | Common musk turtle (Sternotherus odoratus) | |
| Platysternidae; Gray, 1869 | 1 | Big-headed turtle | Big-headed turtle (Platysternon megacephalum) | |
| Testudinidae; Batsch, 1788 | 12 | Tortoises | Aldabra giant tortoise (Geochelone gigantea) | |
| Trionychidae; Fitzinger, 1826 | 14 | Softshell turtles | Spiny softshell turtle (Apalone spinifera) | |
Pleurodira – 3 families, 16 genera, over 60 species
| Family | Genera | Common names | Example species | Example image |
| Chelidae; Gray, 1831 | 15 | Austro-American sideneck turtles | Common snakeneck turtle (Chelodina longicollis) | |
| Pelomedusidae; Cope, 1868 | 2 | Afro-American sideneck turtles | African helmeted turtle (Pelomedusa subrufa) | |
| Podocnemididae; Gray, 1869 | 3 | Madagascar big-headed, big-headed Amazon River turtle and South American sideneck river turtles | Madagascar big-headed turtle (Erymnochelys madagascariensis) | |
