= 2010 in paleontology =

Paleontology or palaeontology is the study of prehistoric life forms on Earth through the examination of plant and animal fossils. This includes the study of body fossils, tracks (ichnites), burrows, cast-off parts, fossilised feces (coprolites), palynomorphs and chemical residues. Because humans have encountered fossils for millennia, paleontology has a long history both before and after becoming formalized as a science. This article records significant discoveries and events related to paleontology that occurred or were published in the year 2010.

== Plants ==
=== Bennettitales ===
Name	Novelty	Status	Authors	Age	Unit	Location	Notes	Images
Pterophyllum palmulum	Sp nov	valid	Miller & Hickey	Cretaceous; Late Albian	Winthrop Formation	USA; Washington	A williamsoniaceous leaf morphospecies.	
Williamsonia aculeata	Sp nov	valid	Miller & Hickey	Cretaceous; Late Albian	Winthrop Formation	USA; Washington	A williamsoniaceous strobilus morphospecies.	
Williamsonia winthropensis	Sp nov	valid	Miller & Hickey	Cretaceous; Late Albian	Winthrop Formation	USA; Washington	A williamsoniaceous strobilus morphospecies.	

=== Cycadales ===
Name	Novelty	Status	Authors	Age	Unit	Location	Notes	Images
Androstrobus scutulatus	Sp nov	valid	Miller & Hickey	Cretaceous; Late Albian	Winthrop Formation	USA; Washington	A male cycad cone of uncertain familial affinities.	
Laceria	gen et sp nov	valid	Miller & Hickey	Cretaceous; Late Albian	Winthrop Formation	USA; Washington	A cycad morphogenus of uncertain affiliation. The type species is L. pulcra	
Orthoneura	gen et sp nov	valid	Miller & Hickey	Cretaceous; Late Albian	Winthrop Formation	USA; Washington	A cycad morphogenus of uncertain affiliation. The type species is L. longissima	
Nilssoniocladus corrugatus	Sp nov	valid	Miller & Hickey	Cretaceous; Late Albian	Winthrop Formation	USA; Washington	A nilsoniaceous leaf morphospecies.	

=== Czekanowkiales ===
Name	Novelty	Status	Authors	Age	Unit	Location	Notes	Images
Czekanowskia durabilis	Sp nov	valid	Miller & Hickey	Cretaceous; Late Albian	Winthrop Formation	USA; Washington	A czekanowskiaceous leaf morphospecies	

=== Pinales ===
Name	Novelty	Status	Authors	Age	Unit	Location	Notes	Images
Athrotaxis parvistrobili	Sp nov	valid	Miller & Hickey	Cretaceous; Late Albian	Winthrop Formation	USA; Washington	A cupressaceous species.	
Brachyphyllum cracenente	Sp nov	valid	Miller & Hickey	Cretaceous; Late Albian	Winthrop Formation	USA; Washington	A pinophyte species of uncertain affiliation.	
Conago	gen et sp nov	valid	Miller & Hickey	Cretaceous; Late Albian	Winthrop Formation	USA; Washington	A pinophyte cone morphogenus of uncertain affiliation. The type species is C. tonsifera Genus also includes C. chartifera, C. fornicata, C. spinosa, & C. tonsifera	
Elatocladus gracilis	Sp nov	valid	Miller & Hickey	Cretaceous; Late Albian	Winthrop Formation	USA; Washington	A pinophyte species of uncertain affiliation.	
Geinitzia dentifolia	Comb nov	valid	(Fontaine) Miller & Hickey	Cretaceous	Patuxent Formation	USA; Maryland	A pinophyte species of uncertain affiliation. Moved from Sphenolepidium dentifolium (1889); Also includes Sequoia ambigua auct. non Heer, 1874a; Bell, 1956, Sphenolepidium pachyphyllum (1889) & Sphenolepidium recurvifolium (1889)	
Geinitzia subtilis	Sp nov	valid	Miller & Hickey	Cretaceous; Late Albian	Winthrop Formation	USA; Washington	A pinophyte species of uncertain affiliation.	
Pagiophyllum tenuifolium	Sp nov	valid	Miller & Hickey	Cretaceous; Late Albian	Winthrop Formation	USA; Washington	A pinophyte species of uncertain affiliation.	
Conago	gen et sp nov	valid	Miller & Hickey	Cretaceous; Late Albian	Winthrop Formation	USA; Washington	A pinophyte morphogenus of uncertain affiliation. The type species is P. creberum	
Podozamites decrescens	Comb & syn nov	valid	(Fontaine) Miller & Hickey	Cretaceous; Aptian	Potomac Group	USA; Virginia	A pinophyte species of uncertain affiliation. Moved from Nageiopsis decrescens (1889); Also includes Nageiopsis heterophylla (1889) & Nageiopsis microphylla (1889)	
Podozamites varifolia	Sp nov	valid	Miller & Hickey	Cretaceous; Late Albian	Winthrop Formation	USA; Washington	A pinophyte species of uncertain affiliation.	
Sphenolepis condita	Comb nov	valid	(Lesquereaux) Miller & Hickey	Cretaceous	Dakota Formation	USA; Kansas	A cupressaceous species. Moved from Sequoia condita (1876)	

=== Pteridospermopsida ===
Name	Novelty	Status	Authors	Age	Unit	Location	Notes	Images
Sagenopteris panda	Sp nov	valid	Miller & Hickey	Cretaceous; Late Albian	Winthrop Formation	USA; Washington	A caytoniaceous pteridospermopsid leaf morphospecies	

=== Angiosperms ===
Name	Novelty	Status	Authors	Age	Unit	Location	Notes	Images
Cornus piggae	Sp nov	Valid	Manchester, Xiang, and Xiang	Tiffanian	Sentinel Butte Formation	USA; North Dakota	Oldest member of Cornus subgenus Cornus.	
Hymenaea allendis	sp nov	Valid	Calvillo-Canadell, Cevallos-Ferriz & Rico-Arce	Late Oligocene - Early Miocene	Mexican amber	Mexico	Second Hymenaea sp. from Mexican amber	
Lagokarpos	Gen et sp nov	Valid	McMurran & Manchester	Late Paleocene - Ypresian	Green River Formation; Fossil Butte Member	USA; Wyoming	A fruit of uncertain affinity Also found in the Clarno Formation (Oregon) & Horsefly Shales (British Columbia); The type species is L. lacustris	
Ploufolia	Gen. nov.	Valid	Sender et al.	Albian	Utrillas Formation	Spain		
Sagaria	Gen et sp nov	Valid	Bravia, Barone Lumagab, & Mickle	Middle Albian	Monti Alburni, near Petina	Italy		
Solaranthus	Gen et sp nov	Valid	Shaolin Zheng & Xin Wang	Middle Jurassic	Jiulongshan Formation	China	An early flowering plant.	
Xingxueanthus	Gen et sp nov	Valid	Xin Wang & Shijun Wang	Middle Jurassic	Haifanggou Formation	China	An early flowering plant.	

=== Other plants ===
Name	Novelty	Status	Authors	Age	Unit	Location	Notes	Images
Desmiophyllum truncatum	Sp nov	valid	Miller & Hickey	Cretaceous; Late Albian	Winthrop Formation	USA; Washington	A plant species of uncertain affiliations.	

== Molluscs ==
=== Newly named bivalves ===
Name	Novelty	Status	Authors	Age	Unit	Location	Notes	Images
Emiliodonta	Gen. nov.	valid	Sánchez	Caradoc	Don Braulio Formation	Argentina	Replacement name for Emiliania Sánchez, 1999 preoccupied by Emiliania Hay & Mohler, 1967	
Erodona doellojuradoi	Sp. nov.	valid	Pérez, Iturerría & Griffin	Late Miocene	Paraná Formation	Argentina	An erodonid.	
Polymesoda muravchiki	Sp. nov.	valid	Pérez, Iturerría & Griffin	Late Miocene	Paraná Formation	Argentina	A cyrenid.	

== Amphibians ==
=== Newly named amphibians ===
Name	Status	Authors	Age	Unit	Location	Notes	Images
Deltaherpeton	Valid	Bolt; Lombard	Late Viséan		USA	A colosteid.	
Fedexia	Valid	Berman; Henrici; et al. (Note: Berman, Henrici, Brezinski, Kollar.)	Gzhelian	Casselman Formation	USA	A trematopid genus currently among the oldest known vertebrates with a primarily terrestrial lifestyle.	
Hungarobatrachus	Valid	Szentesi; Venczel	Santonian	Csehbánya Formation	Hungary	Advanced frog.	
Madygenerpeton	Valid	Schoch; Voigt; Buchwitz	Middle/Upper Triassic	Madygen Formation	Kyrgyzstan	A chroniosuchid reptiliomorph.	
Pelobates fahlbuschi	Valid	Böhme	Miocene		Germany	A European spadefoot toad.	

== Basal reptiles ==
=== Newly named basal reptiles ===
Name	Status	Authors	Age	Unit	Location	Notes	Images
Microleter	Valid	Tsuji; Muller; Reisz	Lower Permian		USA	A basal parareptile. The species is M. mckinzieorum.	
Phonodus	Valid	Modesto; Scott; et al. (Note: Modesto, Scott, Botha-Brink, Reisz.)	Induan (early Triassic)	Katberg Formation	South Africa	The earliest known leptopleuronine procolophonid.	
Reiszorhinus	Valid	Sumida; Dodick; et al. (Note: Sumida, Dodick, Metcalf, Albright.)	Lower Permian	Waggoner Ranch Formation	USA	A basal captorhinid. The species is Reiszorhinus olsoni.	

== Ichthyopterygians ==
=== Newly named ichthyopterygians ===
Name	Status	Authors	Age	Unit	Location	Notes	Images
Arthropterygius	Valid	Maxwell		Queen Elizabeth Islands	Canada	A new genus for "Ophthalmosaurus" chirsorum (Russell, 1993).	
Athabascasaurus	Valid	Druckenmiller; Maxwell	Lower Albian	Clearwater Formation	Canada	The most complete and stratigraphically oldest known ichthyosaur from the Cretaceous of North America.	
Barracudasauroides	Valid	Maisch	Middle Triassic	Guanling Formation	China	A new genus for "Mixosaurus" panxianensis (Jiang, Schmitz, Hao & Sun, 2006).	
Mixosaurus xindianensis	Valid	Chen; Cheng	Middle Triassic	Guanling Formation	China		
Omphalosaurus merriami	Valid	Maisch	Early Triassic	Sticky Keep Formation	Norway	A species of a possible ichthyopterygian genus Omphalosaurus.	

== Lepidosauromorphs ==
=== Newly named plesiosaurs ===
Name	Status	Authors	Age	Unit	Location	Notes	Images
Alexeyisaurus	Valid	Sennikov; Arkhangelsky	Norian	Wilczek Formation	Russia	A new elasmosaurid	
Meyerasaurus	Valid	Smith; Vincent	Lower Toarcian	Posidonia Shale	Germany	A pliosaur, a new genus for "Plesiosaurus" victor (Fraas, 1910).	Meyerasaurus victor

=== Newly named basal lepidosaurs ===
Name	Status	Authors	Age	Unit	Location	Notes	Images
Cargninia	Valid	Bonaparte; Schultz; et al. (Note: Bonaparte, Schultz, Soares, Martinelli.)	Carnian - Norian	Caturrita Formation	Brazil	A basal lepidosaur.	

=== Newly named lizards ===
Name	Status	Authors	Age	Unit	Location	Notes	Images
Adriosaurus skrbinensis	Valid	Caldwell; Palci	Late Cenomanian	Skrbina	Slovenia		
Bavaricordylus molassicus	Valid	Böhme	Miocene (late Karpatian)		Germany	A cordylid, a species of Bavaricordylus.	
Headonhillia	Valid	Klembara; Green	Late Eocene, Ludian (Priabonian)	Bembridge Limestone Formation	England	An anguine lizard. The species is H. parva.	
Heloderma welcommei	Valid	Herman; Van Den Eeckhaut	Eocene		Belgium	An anguimorph lizard. Herman and Van Den Eeckhaut (2010) consider it to be a species of Heloderma (though the authors define the genus Heloderma more broadly than most herpetologists, and explicitly synonymize the glyptosaurine genus Placosaurus with it).	
Kleskunsaurus	Valid	Nydam; Caldwell; Fanti	Upper Campanian	Wapiti Formation	Canada	A scincomorph lizard. The species is K. grandeprairiensis.	
Liushusaurus	Valid	Evans; Wang	Lower Cretaceous	Yixian Formation	China	A scincogekkonomorph lizard. The species is L. acanthocaudata.	
Pedrerasaurus	Valid	Bolet; Evans	Early Cretaceous (late Berriasian-early Valanginan)	Montsec's Formation (ca)	Spain	A scincogekkonomorph lizard. The species is P. latifrontalis.	
Tropidophorus bavaricus	Valid	Böhme	Miocene (late Karpatian)		Germany	A lygosomine skink, a species of Tropidophorus.	
Varanus debiei	Valid	Herman; Van Den Eeckhaut	Eocene		Belgium	A monitor lizard.	

=== Newly named snakes ===
Name	Status	Authors	Age	Unit	Location	Notes	Images
Colombophis spinosus	Valid	Hsiou, Albino & Ferigolo	Late Miocene	Solimões Formation	Brazil	An alethinophidian snake, a species of Colombophis.	
Kelyophis	Valid	Laduke; Krause; Scanlon; Kley	Late Cretaceous (Maastrichtian)	Maevarano Formation	Madagascar	A nigerophiid snake	
Menarana	Valid	Laduke; Krause; Scanlon; Kley	Late Cretaceous (Maastrichtian)	Maevarano Formation	Madagascar	A madtsoiid snake	
Micronatrix	Valid	Parmley & Hunter	Late Miocene (Clarendonian)		United States	A natricine colubrid snake. The type species is Micronatrix juliescottae.	
Sanajeh	Valid	Wilson; Mohabey; et al. (Note: Wilson, Mohabey, Peters, Head.)	Maastrichtian	Lameta Formation	India	A madtsoiid snake which preyed on hatchling sauropods.	Model of Sanajeh in a titanosaur nest

== Turtles ==
=== Newly named turtles ===
Name	Status	Authors	Age	Unit	Location	Notes	Images
Cerrejonemys	Valid	Cadena; Bloch; Jaramillo	Paleocene	Cerrejón Formation	Colombia		
Chupacabrachelys	Valid	Lehman; Wick	Campanian	Aguja Formation	USA	A taphrosphyini bothremydid	
Gamerabaena	Valid	Lyson; Joyce	Late Cretaceous (Maastrichtian)	Hell Creek Formation	USA		
Itilochelys	Valid	Danilov; Averianov; Yarkov	Danian	Beryozovaya beds	Russia		
Jiangxichelys	Valid	Tong; Mo	Late Cretaceous	Ganzhou	China	A nanhsiungchelyid turtle.	
Liaochelys	Valid	Zhou	Early Cretaceous	Jiufotang Formation	China	A macrobaenid turtle.	
Mexichelys	Valid	Parham; Pyenson	Late Campanian	Cerro del Pueblo Formation	Mexico	A sea turtle. A new genus for "Euclastes" coahuilaensis (Brinkman et al., 2009).	
Pacifichelys	Valid	Parham; Pyenson	Miocene		Peru; USA	A sea turtle.	
Pangshura tatrotia	Valid	Joyce; Lyson	Pliocene	Tatrot Formation	Pakistan	A species of Pangshura.	
"Trionyx" kansaiensis	Valid	Vitek & Danilov	Late Cretaceous		Kazakhstan; Tajikistan	A trionychid with unclear systematic position, a species of Trionyx sensu lato.	

== Archosauromorphs ==
=== Newly named basal archosauromorphs ===
Name	Status	Authors	Age	Unit	Location	Notes	Images
Azendohsaurus madagaskarensis	Valid	Flynn; Nesbitt; et al. (Note: Flynn, Nesbitt, Parrish, Ranivoharimanana, Wyss.)	Ladinian/Carnian	Makay Formation	Madagascar	A basal archosauromorph.	
Bentonyx	Valid	Langer; Montefeltro; et al. (Note: Langer, Montefeltro, Hone, Whatley, Schultz.)	Middle Triassic	Otter Sandstone Formation	England	A rhynchosaur.	
Koilamasuchus	Valid	Ezcurra; Lecuona; Martinelli	Early Triassic	Quebrada de los Fósiles Formation	Argentina	The best-known basal archosauriform from South America.	
Megalancosaurus endennae	Valid	Renesto; Spielmann; et al. (Note: Renesto, Spielmann, Lucas, Tarditi Spagnoli.)	Alaunian (early Norian)	Zorzino Limestone Formation	Italy	A drepanosaurid that is known from MBSN 25, a partial skeleton (Partial postcranial skeleton).	
Teyumbaita	Valid	Montefeltro; Langer; Schultz	Late Triassic	Caturrita Formation; Ischigualasto Formation	Argentina; Brazil	A rhynchosaur. A new genus for "Scaphonyx" sulcognathus (Azevedo & Schultz, 1987).	
Uatchitodon schneideri	Valid	Mitchell; Heckert; Sues	Late Triassic	Cumnock Formation; Bluewater Creek Formation	USA	A venomous archosauriform known only from isolated teeth.	
Vallesaurus zorzinensis	Valid	Renesto; Spielmann; et al.	Alaunian (early Norian)	Zorzino Limestone Formation	Italy	A basal drepanosauromorph that is known from MCSNB 4783, a set of vertebrae and hindlimbs.	

== Synapsids ==
=== Newly named non-mammalian synapsids ===
Name	Status	Authors	Age	Unit	Location	Notes	Images
Beishanodon	Valid	Gao; Fox; et al. (Note: Gao, Fox, Zhou, Li.)	Lower Triassic	Hongyanjing Formation	China	A eucynodont. The type species is Beishanodon youngi.	
Chiniquodon kalanoro	Valid	Kammerer; Flynn; et al. (Note: Kammerer, Flynn, Ranivoharimanana, Wyss.)	Middle Triassic? (Ladinian or Carnian)	Makay Formation	Madagascar	A cynodont.	Chiniquodon skull
Kombuisia antarctica	Valid	Fröbisch; Angiekczyk; Sidor	Early Triassic (Induan)	Fremouw Formation	Antarctica	A dicynodont.	
Minicynodon	Valid	Bonaparte; Schultz; et al.	Carnian - Norian	Caturrita Formation	Brazil	A brasilodontid cynodont.	
Prosictodon	Valid	Angielczyk; Rubidge	Middle Permian	Abrahamskraal formation	South Africa	A pylaecephalid dicynodont. The type species is Prosictodon dubei.	
Trucidocynodon	Valid	Oliveira; Soares; Schultz	Upper Triassic	Santa Maria Formation	Brazil	A cynodont. The type species is Trucidocynodon riograndensis.	

== Other animals ==
Name	Status	Authors	Age	Unit	Location	Notes	Images
Pywackia	Valid	Landing in Landing, English & Keppie	Late Cambrian	Tiñu Formation	Mexico	An animal of uncertain phylogenetic placement; it might be a bryozoan or an octocoral. The type species is Pywackia baileyi.	

== Footnotes ==
=== Complete author list ===
As science becomes more collaborative, papers with large numbers of authors are becoming more common. To prevent the deformation of the tables, these footnotes list the contributors to papers that erect new genera and have many authors.
