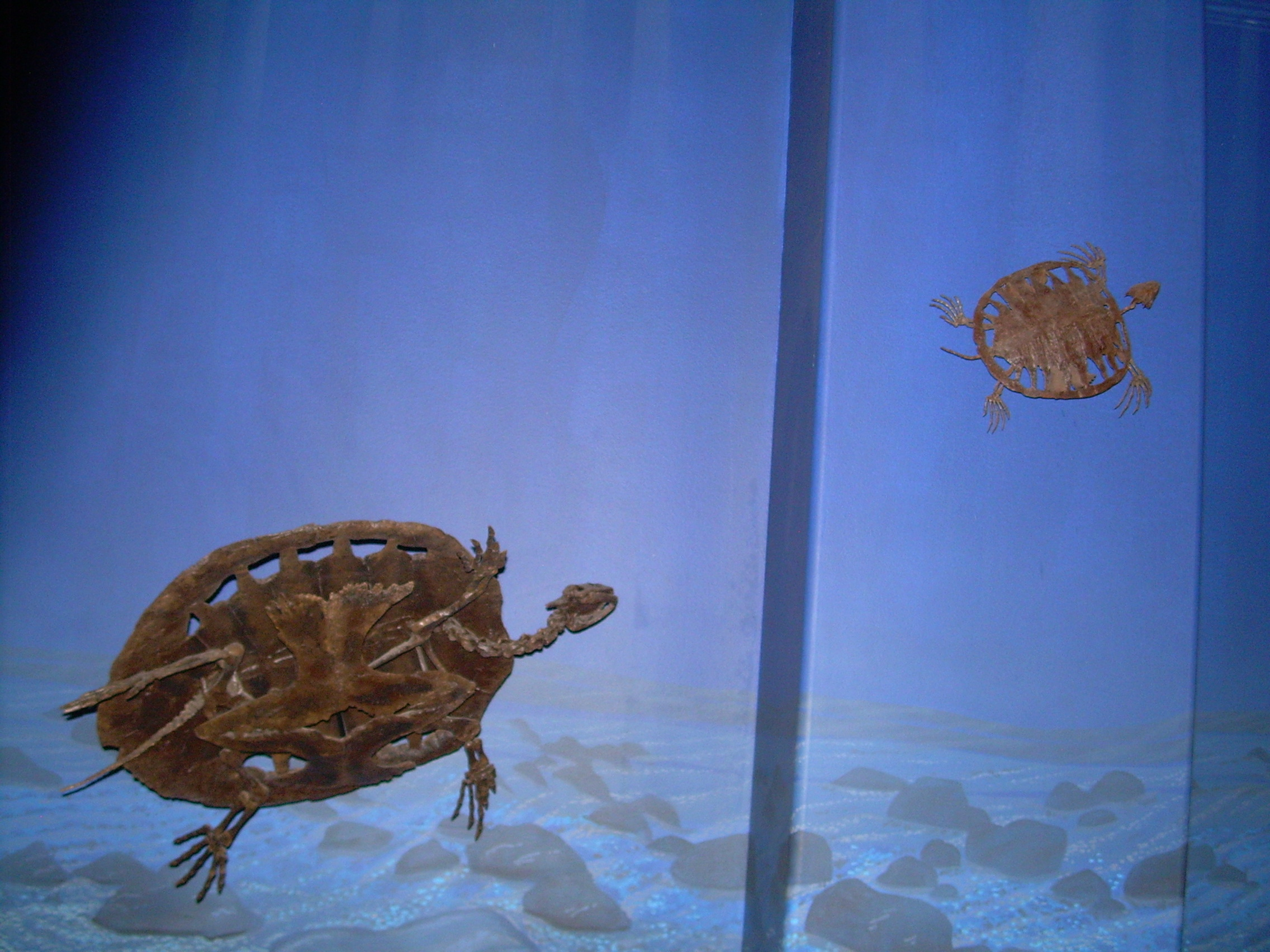
- Ctenochelys stenoporus skeletons

Scientific classification
- Kingdom: Animalia
- Phylum: Chordata
- Class: Reptilia
- Order: Testudines
- Suborder: Cryptodira
- Clade: Panchelonioidea
- Clade: Pancheloniidae

Subgroups
- See text.

= Pancheloniidae =

Pancheloniids Temporal range: Late Cretaceous-Holocene, 73–0 Ma

Clade of turtles

Pancheloniidae is a clade of sea turtles It is defined as all turtles more closely related to cheloniid sea turtles than to dermochelyid ("leatherback") sea turtles.

== Genera ==
The following genera are placed here:

- †Argillochelys
- †Catapleura
- †Ctenochelyidae
- †Erquelinnesia
- †Glossochelys
- †Glyptochelone
- †Itilochelys
- †Lytoloma
- †Osteopygis
- †Pampaemys
- †Peritresius
- †Porthochelys
- †Prionochelys
- †Procolpochelys
- †Retechelys
- †Thinochelys

=== Historic taxon placement ===
The following list of non-cheloniid pancheloniid species was published by Hirayama and Tong in 2003

- †Allopleuron hoffmani, later assigned to Cheloniidae
- †Catapleura arcansaw
- †Catapleura repanda
- †Ctenochelys stenoporus
- †Erquelinnesia gosseleti
- †Glyptochelone suyckerbuykii
- †Lytoloma cantabrigiens
- †Osteopygis emarginatus
- †Pampaemys meridionalis
- †Peritresius ornatus
- †Porthochelys laticeps
- †Prionochelys nauta
- †Retechelys platyops
- †Tasbacka aldabergeni, later assigned to Cheloniidae
- †Thinochelys lapisossea
- †Toxochelys latiremis, later assigned to clade Durocryptodira.

=== Cladogram ===
Below is a cladogram showing the phylogenetic relationships of living and extinct sea turtles in the clade Pancheloniidae based on Lynch and Parham (2003) and Parham and Pyenson (2010).

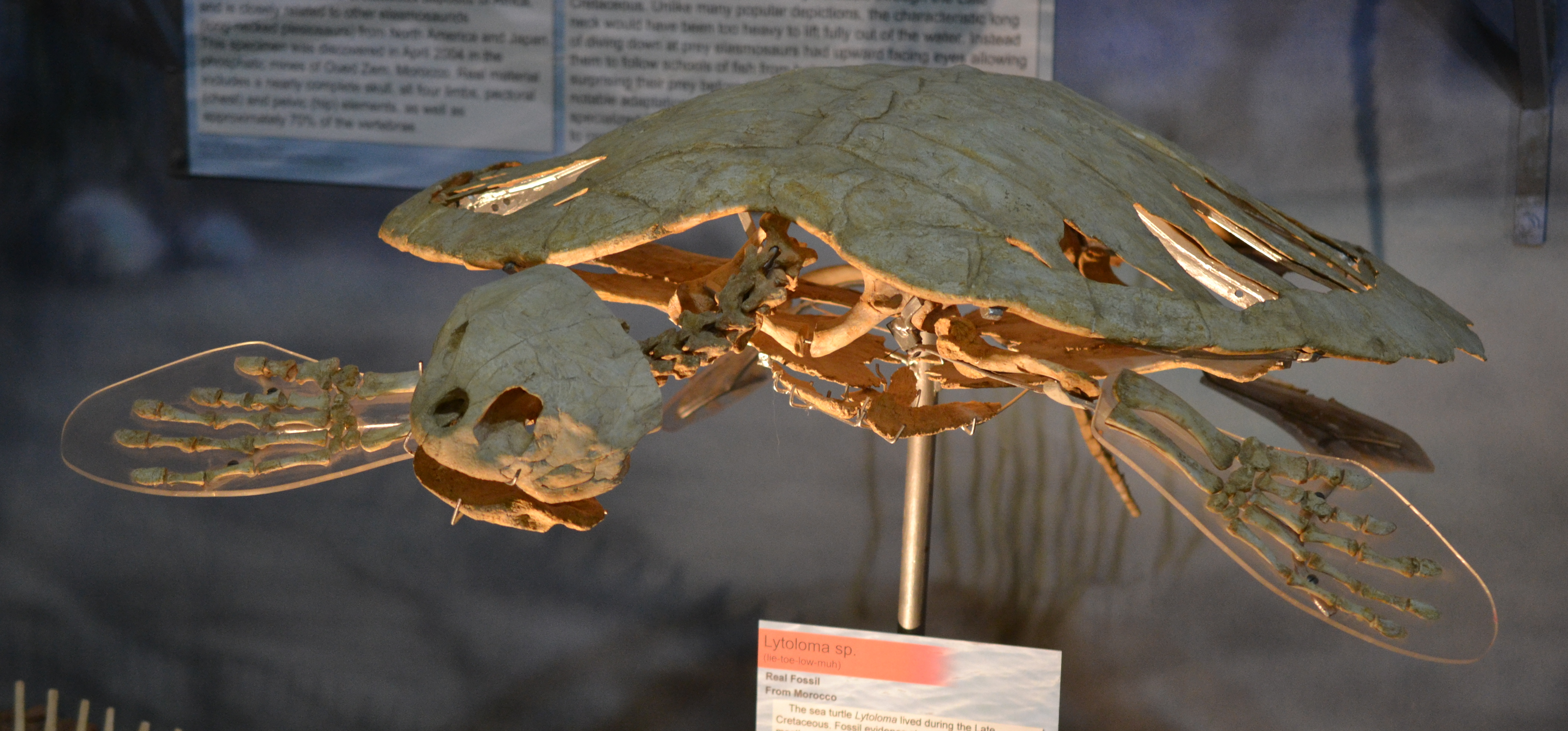
Lytoloma fossil

- Pancheloniidae
  - †Toxochelys
  - - †Mexichelys
    - - †Lophochleyinae
      - - †Euclastes
        - - †Argillochelys
          - †Eochelone
          - - - †Erquelinnesla
              - †Pacifichelys
            - - †Puppigerus
              - Cheloniidae
