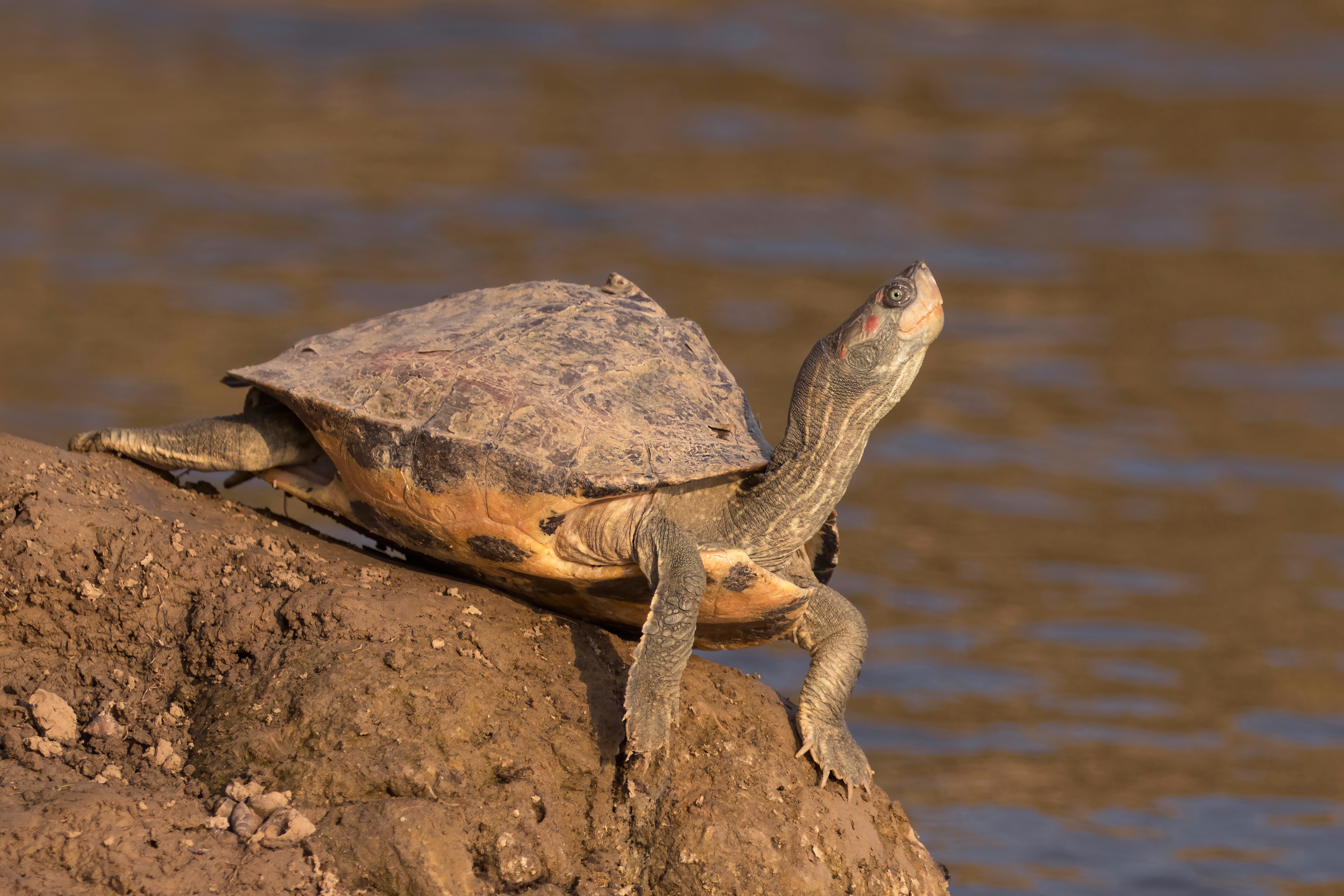
- P. t. tentoria Chambal River, Uttar Pradesh, India

Conservation status
- Least Concern (IUCN 3.1)
- CITES Appendix II

Scientific classification
- Kingdom: Animalia
- Phylum: Chordata
- Class: Reptilia
- Order: Testudines
- Suborder: Cryptodira
- Family: Geoemydidae
- Genus: Pangshura
- Species: P. tentoria

Binomial name
- Pangshura tentoria (Gray, 1834)

Synonyms
- Pangshura tentoria tentoria: Emys tentoria Gray, 1834; Batagur (Pangshura) tentoria Gray, 1856; ? Emys namadicus Theobald, 1860 (nomen nudum); Clemmys tentoria Strauch, 1862; Pangshura tentoria Günther, 1864; Pangshura tentori [sic] Theobald, 1868 (ex errore); Pangshura tentorium Gray, 1869; Emys (Pangshura) tectum var. intermedia Blanford, 1870; Cuchoa tentoria Gray, 1870; Pangshura leithii Gray, 1870; ? Emys namadica Boulenger, 1889; Kachuga intermedia Boulenger, 1889; Kachuga tectum intermedia Annandale, 1912; Kachuga tectum tentoria M.A. Smith, 1931; Kachuga tecta tentoria Mertens, L. Müller & Rust, 1934; Kachuga tentoria tentoria Pritchard, 1979; Pangshura tentoria tentoria Das, 2001; Kachuga tentnria [sic] Artner, 2003 (ex errore); Pangshura tentoria circumdata: Kachuga tecta circumdata Mertens, 1969; Kachuga tecta circumbata [sic] Thelwall, 1971 (ex errore); Kachuga tentoria circumdata Pritchard, 1979; Pangshura tentoria circumdata Das, 2001; Pangshura tentoria flaviventer: Pangshura flaviventer Günther, 1864; Cuchoa flaviventris [sic] Gray, 1870 (ex errore); Kachuga tecta flaviventer Mertens, 1969; Kachuga tentoria flaviventer Moll, 1987; Pangshura tentoria flaviventer Das, 2001

= Indian tent turtle =

Species of turtle

The Indian tent turtle (Pangshura tentoria), or Indian gamp turtle, is a species of turtle in the family Geoemydidae. The species is found in India, Nepal, and Bangladesh.

== Systematics ==
Three subspecies of P. tentoria are recognized as being valid, including the nominotypical subspecies.

- Pangshura tentoria tentoria (Gray, 1834)
- Pangshura tentoria circumdata (Mertens, 1969)
- Pangshura tentoria flaviventer (Günther, 1864)

- Pangshura
  - Pangshura sylhetensis
  - - - Pangshura tecta
      - † Pangshura tatrotia
    - - Pangshura smithii
      - Pangshura tentoria

Cladogram showing Pangshura tentoria within Pangshura

The species was first described in 1834 by John Edward Gray, who placed it in the genus Emys. The type locality was originally given as the Deccan region of India, (Note: Written as "Indiae Orientalis regione Dukhun" by Gray.) and was subsequently restricted by Malcolm Arthur Smith to Daund, Pune district, (Note: Written as "Dhond, Poona Dist." by Smith.) in 1931. The specific name tentoria is derived from the Latin tentorium meaning 'tent', in reference to the shape of the species' carapace. The first instance of the species being placed in Pangshura was Gray's 1870 description of Pangshura leithii, later deemed a synonym of tentoria. The first use of Pangshura tentoria was by James A. Murray in 1886. This became the nominotypical subspecies Pangshura tentoria tentoria.

Pangshura tentoria flaviventer was first described in 1864 by Albert Günther, who classified it as its own species. Authors have varied in classifying it as its own species or as a subspecies of Pangshura tentoria. As of 2025 the Turtle Taxonomy Working Group considers it to be a subspecies.

Pangshura tentoria circumdata was first described in 1969 by Robert Mertens. It is also known commonly as the pink-ringed roofed turtle.

== Description ==
P. tentoria is a small species of turtle, growing to a maximum straight carapace length of 27 cm (11 in).

== Distribution and habitat ==
P. tentoria is found in Peninsular India, Nepal, and Bangladesh at elevations below 80 m (260 ft) asl.

- P. t. tentoria – Mahanadi and Godavari river drainages in India (country endemic)
- P. t. circumdata – upper and central Ganges river drainage in India and southern Nepal
- P. t. flaviventer – lower Ganges drainage in Bangladesh, India, and southern Nepal

P. tentoria is primarily a riverine turtle that occurs in both small and large rivers. They bask on rocks and tree snags. Females are largely herbivores while males and juveniles are more carnivorous.
