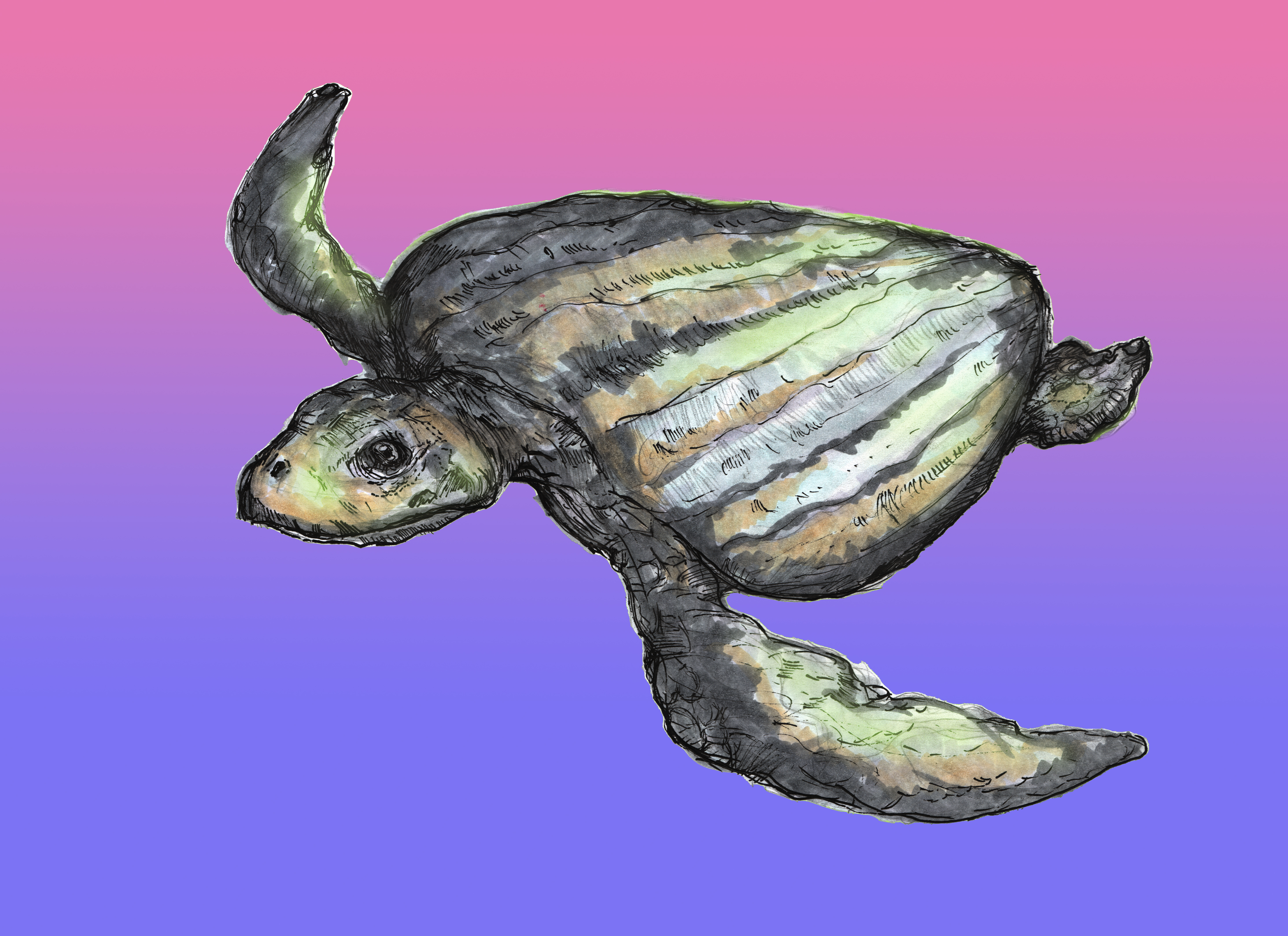
- Erquelinnesia meridionalis restoration from scientific morphological descriptions

Scientific classification
- Kingdom: Animalia
- Phylum: Chordata
- Class: Reptilia
- Order: Testudines
- Suborder: Cryptodira
- Family: Cheloniidae
- Genus: †Erquelinnesia; Dollo, 1887

Species
- †Erquelinnesia gosseleti; †Erquelinnesia meridionalis

= Erquelinnesia =

Erquelinnesia Temporal range: Cretaceous - Paleogene

Extinct genus of turtles

Erquelinnesia is an extinct turtle genus from the Cretaceous period, which has been found in fossils. Paleontologist Louis Dollo first described this genus late 19th century from fossilized samples found in the layers of Upper Paleocene / Lower Eocene in Hainaut, Belgium. Erquelinnesia lived between the Upper Cretaceous (Maastrichtian, about 70.6 million years ago) and Lower Paleocene (Danian, about 61.7 million years ago). Louis Dollo named his discovery as Pachyrhynchus gosseleti in 1886. However, in the following year, the nomenclature was changed by Dollo to Erquelinnesia gosseleti to resolve a conflict with another already existing generic name. Moreover, an additional species was attributed to the genus Erquelinnesia. The North American species called Erquelinnesia molaria that was known only from a fossilized mandible bone has subsequently re-categorized to the genus Euclastes.

In 2010, new remnants were found in South America. The newly discovered species was from the Paleocene of Argentina; it was given the name Erquelinnesia meridionalis. The species was previously designated to a separate genus, Pampaemys and then, Euclastes before the re-classification in light of the newly found fossilized evidence.

== Description ==
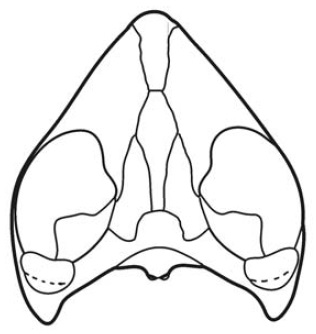
morphological features of Erquelinnesia gosseleti skull

This genus of prehistoric sea turtle was similar to the modern sea turtles like Dermochelys coriacea (leatherback sea turtle); both have reduced carapace and slender bodies. Physically, Erquelinnesia have very large and prominent triangular skulls and elongated symphysis structures of their mandibles. They also have remarkably long secondary palates. The massive jaws and various specialized structures of the jaws appeared to be ideal for crushing the hard shells of ancient mollusks. Erquelinnesia exemplified a development of evolutionary radiation in ancient sea turtles. They have physiologically developed a skull suitable for crushing shells (durophagy). This morphological features survived until the Miocene period with the discovery of the genus Pacifichelys

== Taxonomy ==
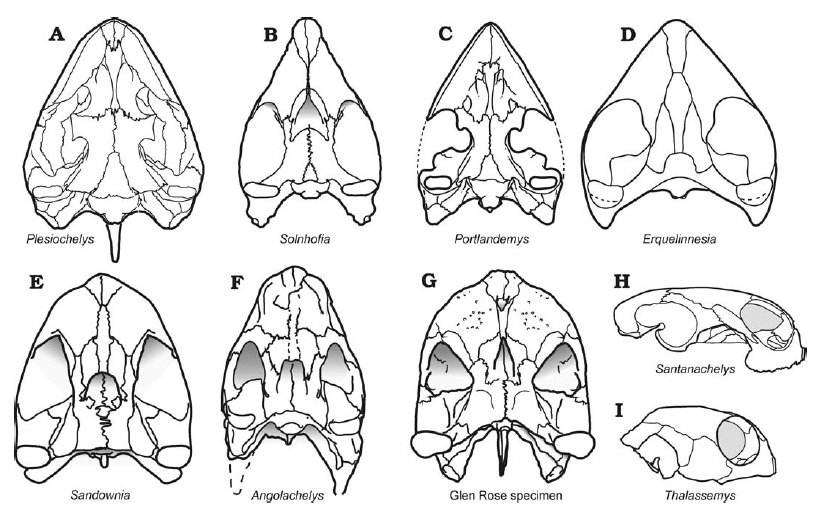
various Eucryptodira fossil skulls for comparative studies

Cladogram based on Lynch and Parham (2003) and Parham and Pyenson (2010):

- Cheloniidae sensu lato
  - Toxochelys
  - - Mexichelys
    - - Lophochelyinae
      - - Euclastes
        - - Argillochelys
          - Eochelone
          - - - Erquelinnesia
              - Pacifichelys
            - - Puppigerus
              - Cheloniidae sensu stricto

== Bibliography ==
- Zangerl, R. 1971. Two toxochelyid sea turtles from the Landenian Sands of Erquelinnes (Hainaut) of Belgium. Institut Royal des Sciences Naturelles de Belgique, Memoires 169: 1–32.
