= Cheloniidae =

Cheloniid sea turtles Temporal range: Late Cretaceous-Holocene, 72–0 Ma
- Green (left) and loggerhead (right) sea turtles

Scientific classification
- Kingdom: Animalia
- Phylum: Chordata
- Class: Reptilia
- Order: Testudines
- Suborder: Cryptodira
- Superfamily: Chelonioidea
- Family: Cheloniidae; Oppel, 1811

Type genus
- Chelonia Brongniart, 1800

Genera
- See text.
- Cheloniidae distribution

Synonyms
- Chelonii - Oppel, 1811; Cheloniadae - Gray, 1825; Carettidae - Gray, 1825; Mydae - Ritgen, 1828; Chelonidae - Bonaparte, 1832; Cheloniidae - Cope, 1868

Family of turtles

Cheloniidae is a family of typically large marine turtles that are characterised by their common traits such as having a flat streamlined wide and rounded shell and almost paddle-like flippers for their forelimbs. They are the only sea turtles to have stronger front limbs than back limbs. The six living species that make up this family are the green sea turtle, loggerhead sea turtle, olive ridley sea turtle, hawksbill sea turtle, flatback sea turtle and the Kemp's ridley sea turtle.

== Classification ==
=== Extant genera ===
- Subfamily Carettinae
  - Genus Caretta
    - Loggerhead sea turtle (Caretta caretta)
  - Genus Lepidochelys
    - Kemp's ridley sea turtle (Lepidochelys kempii)
    - Olive ridley sea turtle (Lepidochelys olivacea)
- Subfamily Cheloniinae
  - Genus Chelonia
    - Green sea turtle (Chelonia mydas)
  - Genus Eretmochelys
    - Hawksbill sea turtle (Eretmochelys imbricata)
  - Genus Natator
    - Flatback sea turtle (Natator depressus) (previously in Chelonia)

=== Extinct genera ===
- †Allopleuron
- †Argillochelys
- †Cabindachelys
- †Carolinochelys
- †Catapleura
- †Erquelinnesia
- †Gigantatypus
- †Glyptochelone
- †Itilochelys
- †Lytoloma
- †Marocokatognathus
- †Osteopygis
- †Pampaemys
- †Peritresius
- †Porthochelys
- †Prionochelys
- †Procolpochelys
- †Retechelys
- †Syllomus
- †Tasbacka
- †Thinochelys
- †Miocaretta

=== Phylogenetics ===
Below is a cladogram showing the phylogenetic relationships of living and extinct sea turtles in the family Cheloniidae based on Lynch and Parham (2003) and Parham and Pyenson (2010).

- Pancheloniidae (=Cheloniidae sensu lato)
  - †Toxochelys
  - - †Mexichelys
    - - †Lophochleyinae
      - - †Euclastes
        - - †Argillochelys
          - †Eochelone
          - - - †Erquelinnesia
              - †Pacifichelys
            - - †Puppigerus
              - Cheloniidae(sensu stricto)
                - †Syllomus
                - - †Procolpochelys
                  - - Chelonia mydas
                    - Natator depressus
                  - - Eretmochelys imbricata
                    - Carettini
                      - Lepidochelys
                        - Lepidochelys kempii
                        - Lepidochelys olivacea
                      - Caretta caretta

== Morphology ==
In contrast to their earth-bound relatives, tortoises, sea turtles do not have the ability to retract their heads into their shells. Their plastron, which is the bony plate making up the underside of a turtle or tortoise's shell, is comparably more reduced from other turtle species and is connected to the top part of the shell by ligaments without a hinge separating the pectoral and abdominal plates of the plastron. Sizes among the seven species of sea turtles range from 71 to 213 cm; for example, the smallest turtle species in the family Cheloniidae, the Kemp's ridley, only has a shell size of about 75 cm and a weight of 50 kg. All species have a distinct hardened shell.

Hawksbill

Loggerhead

Olive ridley

Kemp's ridley

Green

*Flatback (Natator compressus) not pictured

== Reproduction and life cycle ==
Reproductive behaviors among the different species of sea turtles are similar, with slight differences in each of the species. The females come to shore and bury their clutch of eggs on beaches or sandy environments typically at night and well away from the high tide line of the shore. Most females nest only once every three to four years and most species have two to four egg laying time periods per nesting season, which is from spring to late fall. A common number of eggs laid in a nest is often about 100 eggs per clutch. The incubation period of some turtles can range anywhere from 50 to 60 days. The development of the eggs is dependent on the temperature of the environment that they were buried in, with warmer climates bringing about an earlier emergence by the hatchlings. The timing of sea turtle hatching tends to be almost synchronous among the whole clutch of eggs, with just about all the eggs in the nest hatching within the same time. This is thought to aid the process of the hatchlings unburying themselves from the sand and most often occurs at night time. Temperature has also been linked to the likeliness of hatching's sex, warmer temperature more likely to produce females and colder temperatures more commonly producing males.

== Habitat and ecology ==
The habitat range of sea turtles, in general, is known to be far reaching into warmer temperatures and the tropical and subtropical areas of the Pacific and Atlantic Oceans and is even also found in warmer seas such as the Mediterranean Sea. Within these temperamental biomes, sea turtles frequent near by the coastlines when nesting, and spend most of their lives swimming out in waters over the continental shelf when feeding. Travelling throughout the oceans has been reported in olive ridley sea turtles but more often than not, they tend to frequent bays and estuaries. The diets of all the sea turtle species, except for the green sea turtle, which is only herbivorous from hatchling to juvenile, are mostly carnivorous, with some herbivorous tendencies. Sea turtles feed mainly on sea sponges, jellyfish, mollusks and barnacles, sea urchins, and even fish. The green sea turtle, on the other hand, feeds primarily on many different types of sea grasses.

== Climate change ==
Sea turtles are ectotherms, meaning their life history traits, behaviors, and physiology are impacted by environmental temperature, which determines sea turtle sex-ratio and hatching success. This sensitivity makes them highly vulnerable to increasing temperatures and events related to climate change. Temperature increases also drive processes like sea-level rise and cyclonic activity, both of which can alter nesting environments and increase the risk of embryo mortality.

A study predicted that by 2070, nesting grounds of Chelonia mydas in the Northern Great Barrier Reef would be most vulnerable to higher temperatures, with temperature posing a greater threat than sea-level rise and cyclonic activity. Mitigating temperature-related threats will have the greatest impact on reducing nesting site vulnerability. Climate risks will vary geographically and across species as different species of sea turtles will adapt their nesting behavior and ecology in response to ongoing climate change.

Despite rising temperatures, sea turtles have shown resilience to climate changes in the past that have allowed them to persist for millions of years. Cheloniidae and Dermochelyidae (sister group) are the only sea turtle families that have survived extreme periods of climatic fluctuation, thus they may adapt to future climate conditions.

== Conservation status and significance to humans ==
The conservation status of each of the seven turtle species vary from endangered or threatened, to least concern or data deficient (Flatback). The green and Loggerhead sea turtles were both recategorized in late 2025 to least concern and vulnerable, respectively. Olive Ridley are classified as vulnerable, Kemp's Ridley, and Hawksbill sea turtles are critically endangered and the Flatback sea turtle does not have enough data to draw an accurate conclusion on conservation status.

Most do not reach sexual maturity before becoming prey to other organisms, or being caught by humans either intentionally or as bycatch by commercial fishing operations. Their slow maturity rate, which most of the time means about 10 or 15 years, does not allow the turtles which have been caught to have fully reproductively matured and to have produced hatchlings of their own. International legislation has been put into place to attempt to reduce the number of sea turtle deaths but this does not deter the demand for the consumption of turtle eggs around the world, and some are hunted for their shells.

In addition to this, turtles face another threat which has been theorized as being linked to human pollution. A growing number of turtles have been found with fibropapillomatosis, fibrous tumor growths on their skin, mouths, and even internal organs. In some areas the number of infected turtles is over 70%. It is unknown what the effects of the growths will have in the long term for sea turtle populations.

Sea turtles play a very important part in marine ecosystems. They maintain the balance of health of sea grasses and reefs, which in turn benefit the likes of shrimp, lobsters, and tunas. They are also the last living members of the seafaring category of marine reptiles that have been in existence on Earth for at least the past 100 million years. They are also highly significant to multiple cultures and are also popular animals in tourism, which gives a higher importance to their conservation.

== Sources ==
- Rhodin, Anders G.J.; Iverson, John B.; Bour, Roger; Fritz, Uwe; Georges, Arthur; Shaffer, H. Bradley; van Dijk, Peter Paul (2021). Turtles of the World: Annotated Checklist and Atlas of Taxonomy, Synonymy, Distribution, and Conservation Status. Chelonian Research Monographs. Vol. 8 (9th ed.). doi:10.3854/crm.8.checklist.atlas.v9.2021. ISBN 978-0-9910368-3-7.
