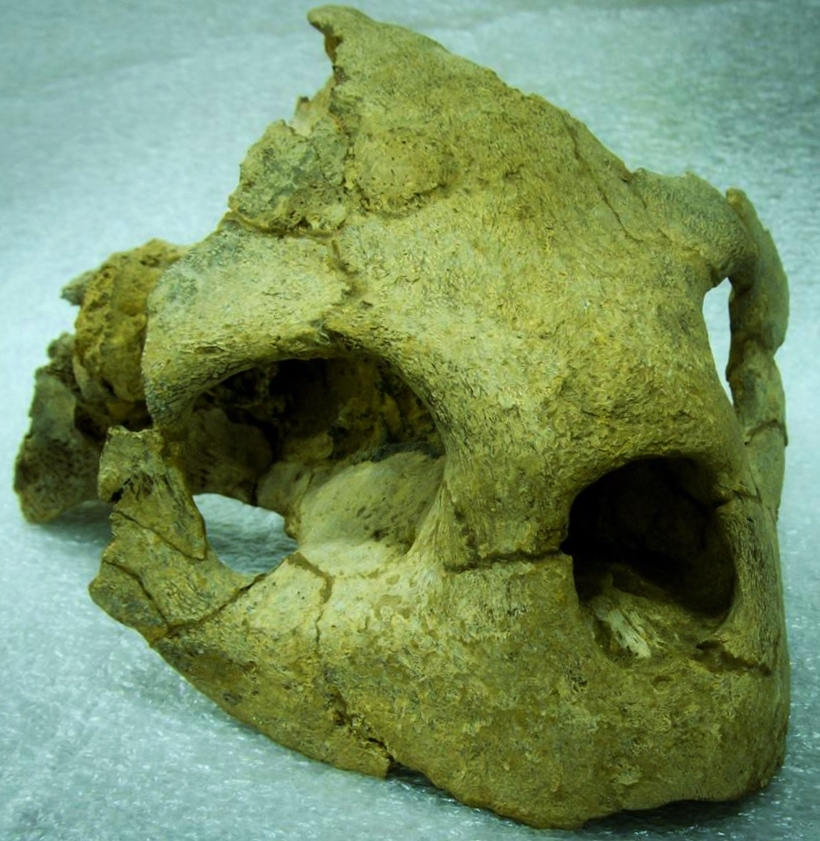
- Skull of Pacifichelys urbinai

Scientific classification
- Domain: Eukaryota
- Kingdom: Animalia
- Phylum: Chordata
- Class: Reptilia
- Order: Testudines
- Suborder: Cryptodira
- Superfamily: Chelonioidea
- Family: Cheloniidae
- Genus: †Pacifichelys

Type species
- Pacifichelys urbinai Parham and Pyenson, 2010

Species
- P. urbinai Parham and Pyenson, 2010; P. hutchisoni (Lynch and Parham, 2003)

Synonyms
- Euclastes hutchisoni Lynch and Parham, 2003)

= Pacifichelys =

Pacifichelys Temporal range: Mid Miocene (Friasian-Laventan) ~15.97–13.65 Ma

Extinct genus of turtles

Pacifichelys is an extinct genus of sea turtle from the Middle Miocene of Peru (Pisco Formation) and California (Temblor Formation). It was first named by James F. Parham and Nicholas D. Pyenson in 2010, and the type species is Pacifichelys urbinai from Peru. A second species, P. hutchisoni, was reassigned from the genus Euclastes. It is known from the Miocene of California. Like the living Ridley and loggerhead sea turtles, Pacifichelys was durophagous, consuming hard-shelled organisms with crushing jaws.

== Taxonomy ==
Cladogram based on Lynch and Parham (2003) and Parham and Pyenson (2010):

- Cheloniidae sensu lato
  - Toxochelys
  - - Mexichelys
    - - Lophochelyinae
      - - Euclastes
        - - Argillochelys
          - Eochelone
          - - - Erquelinnesia
              - Pacifichelys
            - - Puppigerus
              - Cheloniidae sensu stricto
