= Chelonii =

Chelonii may refer to:

- Chelonii, the order of turtles.
- Chelonioidea, the superfamily of sea turtles, who have a synonym of Chelonii.
- Cheloniidae, a family of sea turtle, who have a synonym of Chelonii.
