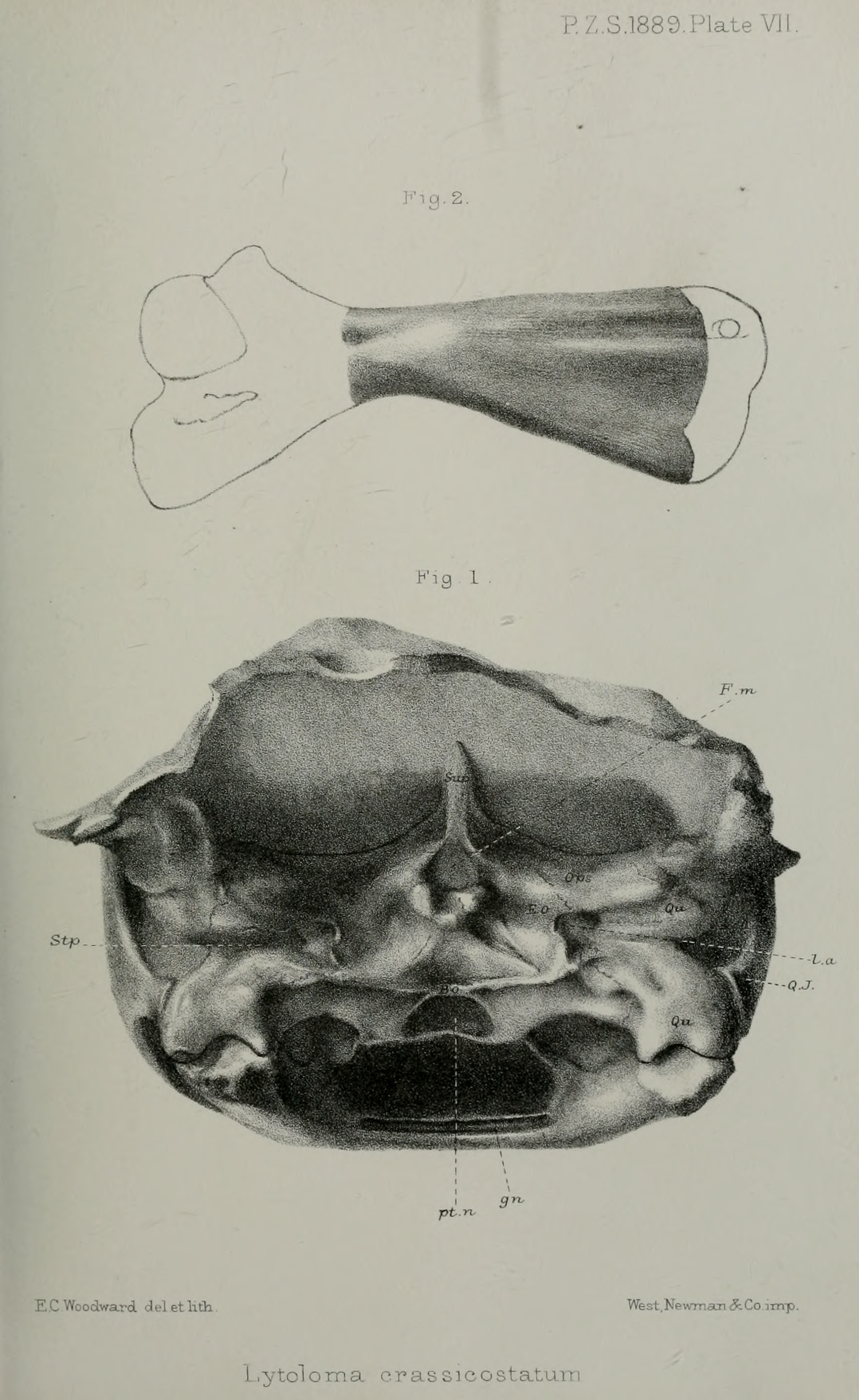
- Humerus seen from above and skull seen from behind

Scientific classification
- Domain: Eukaryota
- Kingdom: Animalia
- Phylum: Chordata
- Class: Reptilia
- Order: Testudines
- Suborder: Cryptodira
- Genus: †Glossochelys; Seeley, 1871
- Species: †G. planimentum

Binomial name
- †Glossochelys planimentum Owen, 1842

Synonyms
- Chelone planimentum Owen, 1842; Erquelinnesia planimenta Owen, 1842; Lytoloma crassicostatum Owen, 1842; Lytoloma planimentum Owen, 1842

= Glossochelys =

Glossochelys Temporal range: Eocene, 55.8–48.6 Ma

Extinct genus of sea turtles

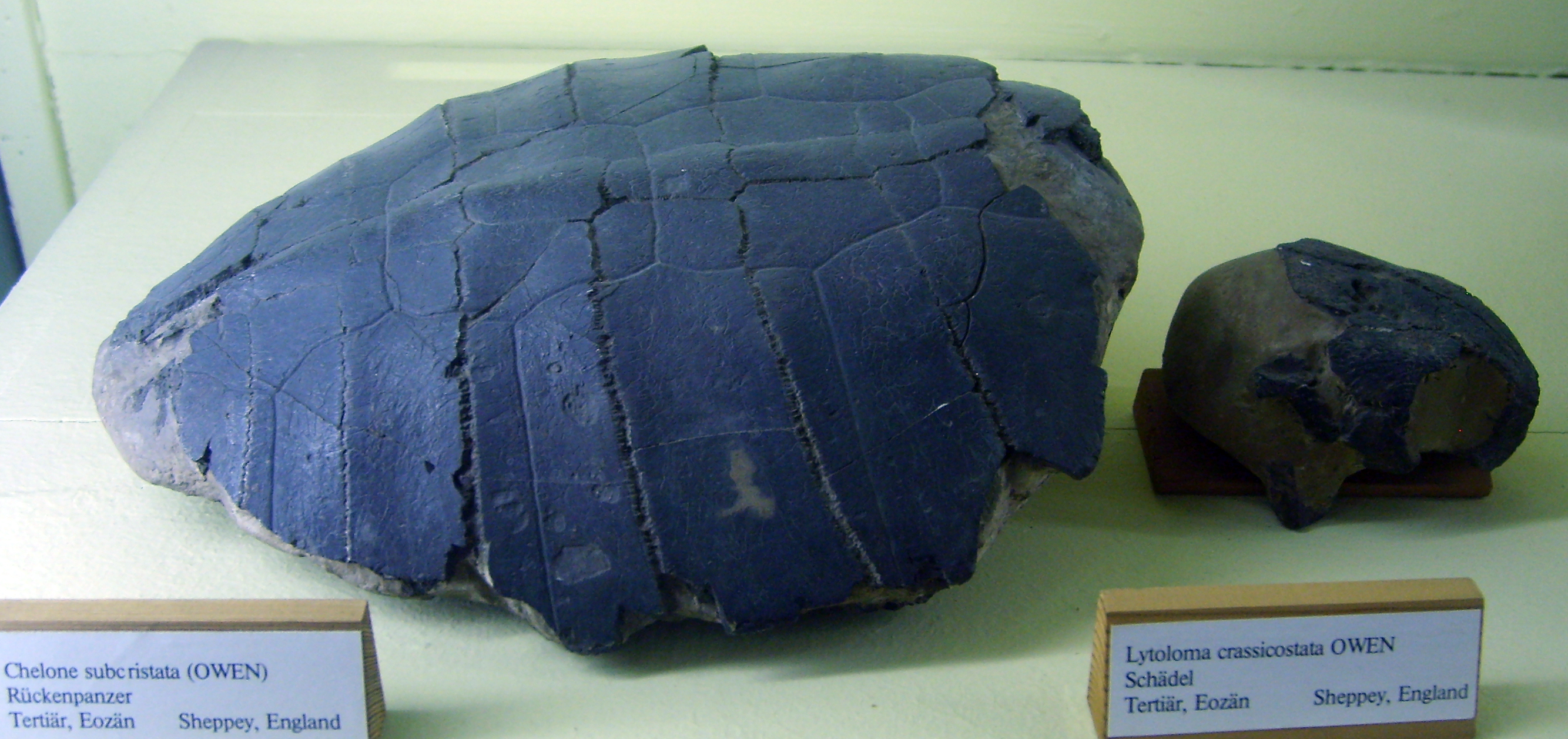
Shell of Argillochelys and skull of G. planimentum, at the Museum für Naturkunde, Berlin

Glossochelys is an extinct genus of sea turtles from the Pancheloniidae that has been discovered in Eocene (Ypresian) deposits in Harwich, England (London Clay Formation) that was first described as a species of Lytoloma in 1842. The type species, G. planimentum, was described as a separate species in 1871 by Harry Seeley. It was possibly the same animal as Euclastes or Erquelinnesia.
