= Miocaretta =

Miocaretta Temporal range: Miocene

Scientific classification
- Kingdom: Animalia
- Phylum: Chordata
- Order: Testudines
- Suborder: Cryptodira
- Family: Cheloniidae
- Genus: †Miocaretta; Deraniyagala, 1967
- Species: †M. lankae

Binomial name
- †Miocaretta lankae Deraniyagala, 1967

Extinct genus of turtles

Miocaretta is an extinct genus of sea turtle from the Miocene era in what is now Sri Lanka. It was first named by Paul E. P. Deraniyagala in 1967. The type and only species is M. lankae.
