= Mexichelys =

Mexichelys Temporal range: Late Campanian

Scientific classification
- Domain: Eukaryota
- Kingdom: Animalia
- Phylum: Chordata
- Class: Reptilia
- Order: Testudines
- Suborder: Cryptodira
- Superfamily: Chelonioidea
- Family: Cheloniidae
- Genus: Mexichelys; Parham & Pyenson, 2010

Species
- M. coahuilaensis (Brinkman et al., 2009) (type)

Synonyms
- Euclastes coahuilaensis Brinkman et al., 2009

Extinct genus of turtles

Mexichelys is an extinct monotypic genus of sea turtle which lived in Mexico during the Cretaceous. The only species is Mexichelys coahuilaensis. Mexichelys was erected in 2010 as a replacement name for Euclastes coahuilaensis, a species named in 2009.

Cladogram based on Lynch and Parham (2003) and Parham and Pyenson (2010):

- Cheloniidae sensu lato
  - Toxochelys
  - - Mexichelys
    - - Lophochelyinae
      - - Euclastes
        - - Argillochelys
          - Eochelone
          - - - Erquelinnesla
              - Pacifichelys
            - - Puppigerus
              - Cheloniidae sensu stricto
