= Solaranthus =

Solaranthus Temporal range: Middle Jurassic

Scientific classification
- Kingdom: Plantae
- Clade: Tracheophytes
- Clade: Angiosperms (?)
- Genus: †Solaranthus; Zheng & Wang, 2010

Species
- S. daohugouensis Zheng & Wang, 2010 (type)

Extinct genus of plants

Solaranthus is an extinct genus of plants with contentious affinities which has been found fossilized in the Jiulongshan Formation of China. It dates to the middle Jurassic period. It was first named by Shaolin Zheng and Xin Wang in 2010 and the type species is Solaranthus daohugouensis.

Some authors interpret Solaranthus as an unusual angiosperm, while others consider it a cycadalean or peltaspermalean pollen organ.
