= Potamomya =

Potamomya Temporal range: Late Eocene

Scientific classification
- Kingdom: Animalia
- Phylum: Mollusca
- Class: Bivalvia
- Order: Myida
- Family: Erodonidae
- Genus: †Potamomya; J. de C. Sowerby, 1835

Extinct genus of bivalves

Potamomya is an extinct genus of bivalve mollusc from the late Eocene of Europe.
