= Xingxueanthus =

Xingxueanthus Temporal range: Middle Jurassic

Scientific classification
- Kingdom: Plantae
- Clade: Tracheophytes
- Clade: Angiosperms (?)
- Genus: †Xingxueanthus; Xin Wang & Shijun Wang, 2010

Species
- X. sinensis Xin Wang & Shijun Wang, 2010 (type)

Extinct genus of flowering plants

Xingxueanthus is an extinct genus of plants of dubious affinity which existed in China during the middle Jurassic period. It was first named by Xin Wang and Shijun Wang in 2010 and the type species is Xingxueanthus sinensis.

Xingxueanthus is known only from a single specimen of carbonized inflorescence. There is debate as to the taxonomic position of Xingxueanthus, being either an early Angiosperm, a new class of Gymnosperm, or a poorly preserved conipherophyte cone.
