= Headonhillia =

Headonhillia Temporal range: Eocene

Scientific classification
- Domain: Eukaryota
- Kingdom: Animalia
- Phylum: Chordata
- Class: Reptilia
- Order: Squamata
- Family: Anguidae
- Subfamily: Anguinae
- Genus: Headonhillia; Klembara and Green, 2010

Species
- H. parva Klembara and Green, 2010 (type)

Extinct genus of lizards

Headonhillia is an extinct genus of anguine lizard which existed in England during the Eocene epoch. It was first named by Jozef Klembara and Bryony Green in 2010, and represents one of the smallest anguines currently known. The type species is Headonhillia parva. Fossils have been found in the Hampshire Basin.
