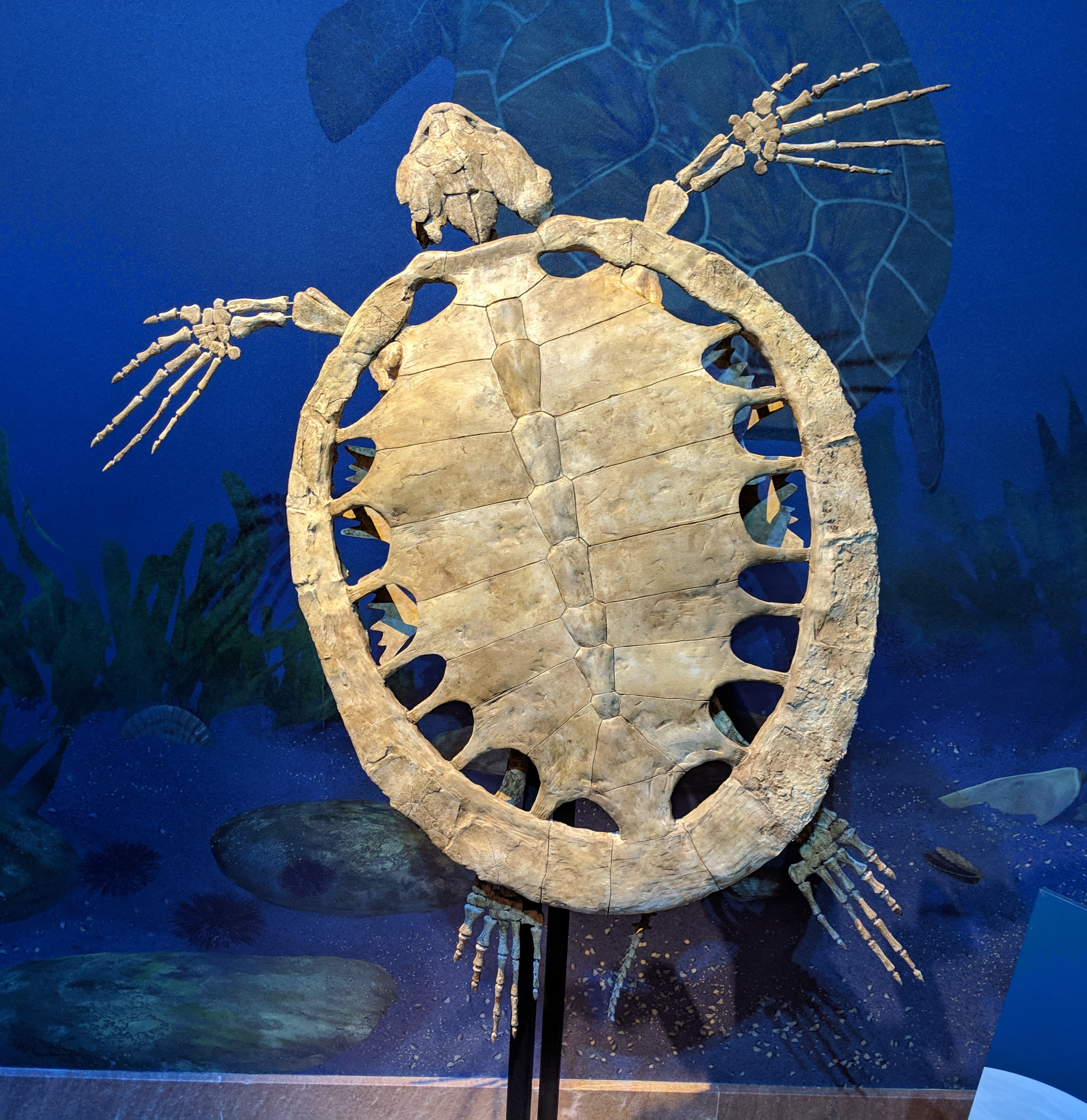
- Euclastes sp. skeleton

Scientific classification
- Kingdom: Animalia
- Phylum: Chordata
- Class: Reptilia
- Order: Testudines
- Suborder: Cryptodira
- Clade: Pancheloniidae
- Genus: †Euclastes; Cope, 1867

Species
- †E. acutirostris Jalil et al., 2009; †E. montenati De Lapparent de Broin, 2025; †E. platyops Cope, 1867; †E. wielandi (Hay, 1908)

Synonyms
- Glossochelys? Seeley 1871; Rhetechelys Hay, 1908; Osteopygoides Karl et al., 1998; Catapleura Cope, 1870

= Euclastes =

Euclastes Temporal range: Maastrichtian-Late Eocene ~70–34 Ma

Extinct genus of turtles

Euclastes is an extinct genus of sea turtles that survived the Cretaceous–Paleogene mass extinction. The genus was first named by Edward Drinker Cope in 1867, and contains three species. E. hutchisoni, was named in 2003 but has since been reassigned to the genus Pacifichelys, while E. coahuilaensis named in 2009 was reassigned as Mexichelys coahuilaensis in 2010.

== Description ==
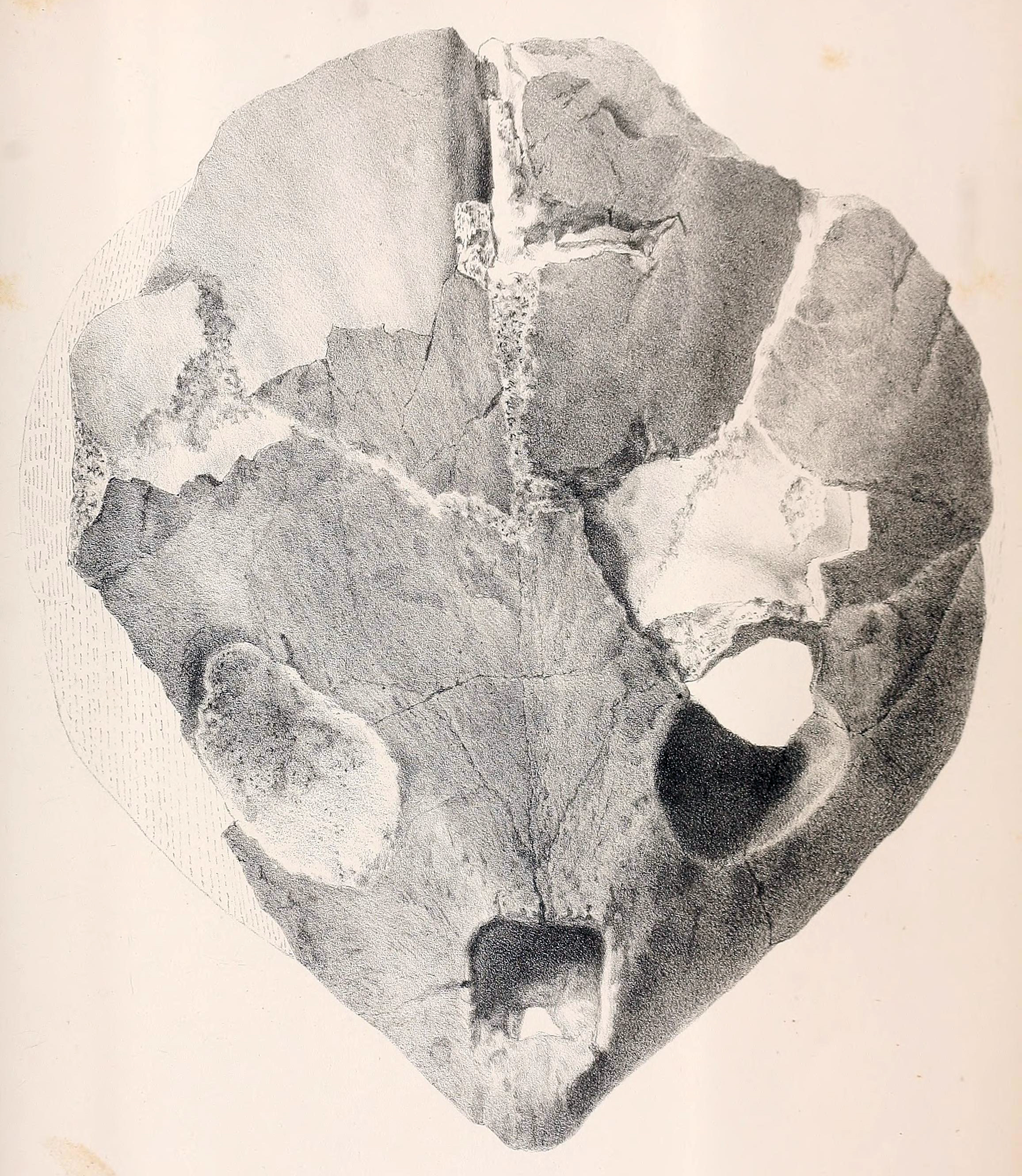
E. platyops skull

Unlike the sea turtles Toxochelys and Eochelone, Euclastes has a secondary palate. However, the secondary palate of Euclastes is not as extensive as it is in Ctenochelys and Angolachelys. The genus can be distinguished by later sea turtles based on its broad, low skull; broad, flat palate; wide, flat dentary bone with an elongated symphysis; and low tomial ridge on the beak. The widened palate and dentaries give Eochelone wide, flat jaws suitable for crushing hard-shelled organisms.

== Classification ==
=== Species ===
- †E. acutirostris Jalil et al., 2009
- †E. montenati De Lapparent de Broin, 2025
- †E. platyops Cope, 1867
- †E. wielandi (Hay, 1908)

=== Phylogeny ===
Cladogram based on Lynch and Parham (2003) and Parham and Pyenson (2010):

- Cheloniidae sensu lato
  - Toxochelys
  - - Mexichelys
    - - Lophochleyinae
      - - Euclastes
        - - Argillochelys
          - Eochelone
          - - - Erquelinnesla
              - Pacifichelys
            - - Puppigerus
              - Cheloniidae sensu stricto

== Distribution ==
Fossils of Euclastes have been found in:

Maastrichtian

- Bentiaba, Angola
- Quiriquina Formation, Chile
- Hornerstown and Navesink Formations, New Jersey

Paleocene

- Jagüel and Roca Formations, Argentina
- Bracheux Formation, France
- Aquia and Brightseat Formations, Maryland
- Sidi Chennane and Couche 2 Formation, Morocco

Eocene

- Parkers Ferry Formation, South Carolina
