= Syllomus =

Syllomus Temporal range: Miocene

Scientific classification
- Kingdom: Animalia
- Phylum: Chordata
- Class: Reptilia
- Order: Testudines
- Suborder: Cryptodira
- Family: Cheloniidae
- Genus: †Syllomus; Cope 1896

Extinct genus of turtles

Syllomus is an extinct genus of sea turtle from the Miocene-age deposits in the US Eastern Seaboard and Egypt.

== Taxonomy ==
Two species are known, Syllomus aegyptiacus (Lydekker, 1889) and S. crispatus Cope, 1896. Lapparent de Broin (2001) considers Trachyaspis a possible senior synonym of Syllomus.
