= Kleskunsaurus =

Kleskunsaurus Temporal range: Late Cretaceous

Scientific classification
- Domain: Eukaryota
- Kingdom: Animalia
- Phylum: Chordata
- Class: Reptilia
- Order: Squamata
- Infraorder: Scincomorpha
- Genus: †Kleskunsaurus; Nydam et al., 2010

Species
- K. grandeprairiensis Nydam et al., 2010

Extinct genus of lizards

Kleskunsaurus is an extinct genus of scincomorph lizard from the Late Cretaceous of Alberta, Canada. It was first named by paleontologists Randall L. Nydam, Michael W. Caldwell, and Federico Fanti in 2010, and the type species is Kleskunsaurus grandeprairiensis. The genus is named after Kleskun Hill Park, located east of Grande Prairie in Peace River Country. Fossils have been found from the park in a bentonitic paleosol that is part of the Campanian Wapiti Formation.
