= Marocokatognathus =

Marocokatognathus Temporal range: Palaeocene–Eocene boundary, (Thanetian–Ypresian)

Scientific classification
- Kingdom: Animalia
- Phylum: Chordata
- Class: Reptilia
- Order: Testudines
- Suborder: Cryptodira
- Family: Cheloniidae
- Genus: †Marocokatognathus; Lapparent de Broin, Murelaga & Vacant, 2025
- Species: †M. jimenezi

Binomial name
- †Marocokatognathus jimenezi Lapparent de Broin, Murelaga & Vacant, 2025

Genus of fossil turtles

Marocokatognathus (lit. 'Moroccan lower jaw') is an extinct genus of sea turtle in the family Cheloniidae known from the lower Paleogene Ouled Abdoun Basin of Morocco. The genus contains a single species, Marocokatognathus jimenezi, known from part of a lower jaw. Compared to all other sea turtles, the lower beak of Marocokatognathus is unusually long, with an upward curve. The narrowness of the beak implies it did not consume an abundance of hard-shelled food.
