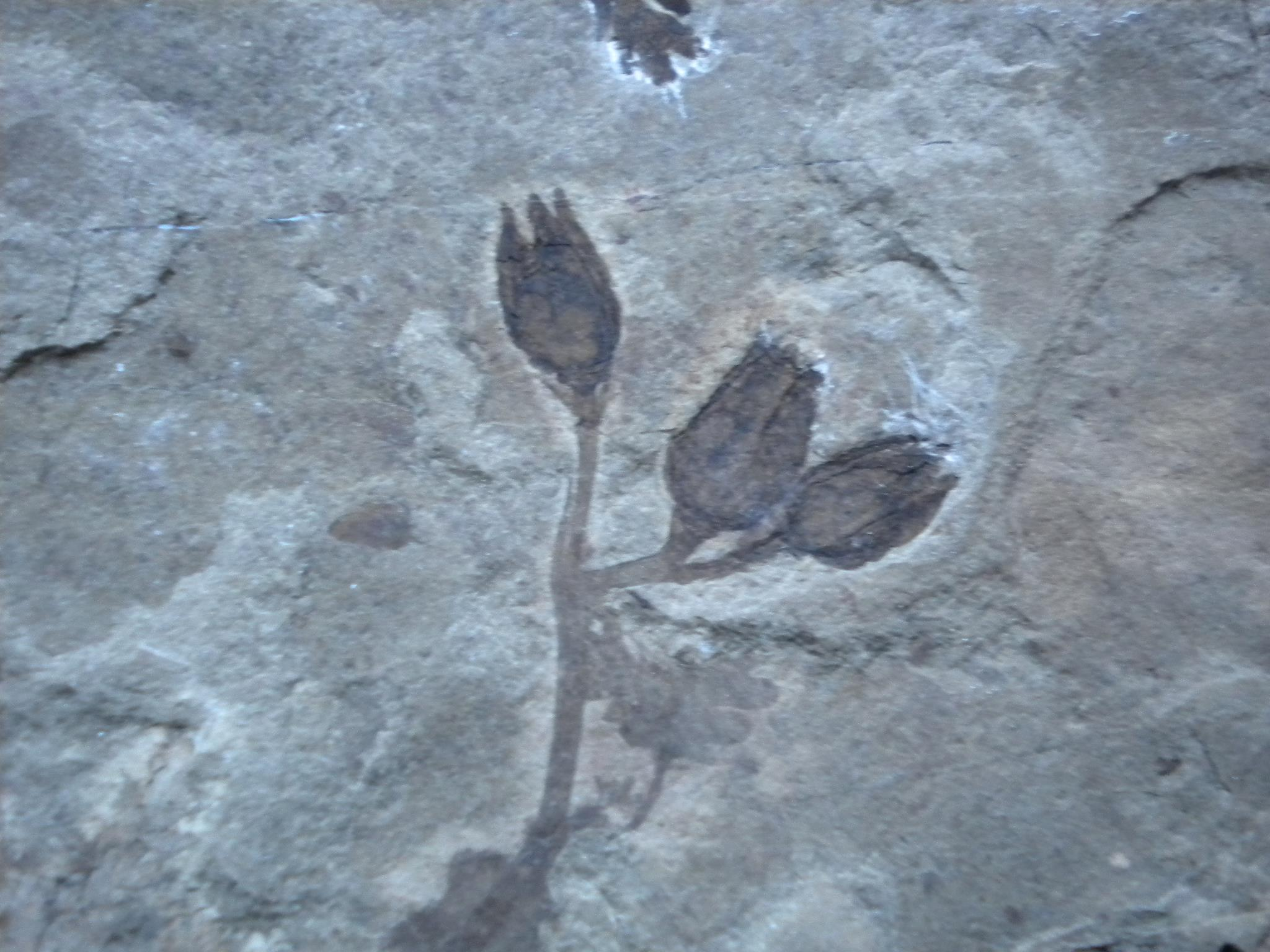

Scientific classification
- Kingdom: Plantae
- (unranked): Angiosperms
- (unranked): Eudicots
- Order: Ranunculales
- Family: Ranunculaceae
- Genus: Sagaria Bravi, Barone Lumaga & Mickle, 2010

= Sagaria =

Sagaria Temporal range: Albian

Extinct genus of plants

Sagaria is an extinct genus of flowering plant in the Ranunculaceae (the buttercup family) which existed in southern Italy during the Albian age. The type species is Sagaria cilentana.

== Taxonomy ==
The genus was erected based on a single specimen (part and counterpart) retrieved from an exposure in the Alburni mountains near Petina, in the Campania region. The locality was already known for both crustacean and plant fossils. The name is dedicated to the collector of the specimen, Giovanni Sagaria.
