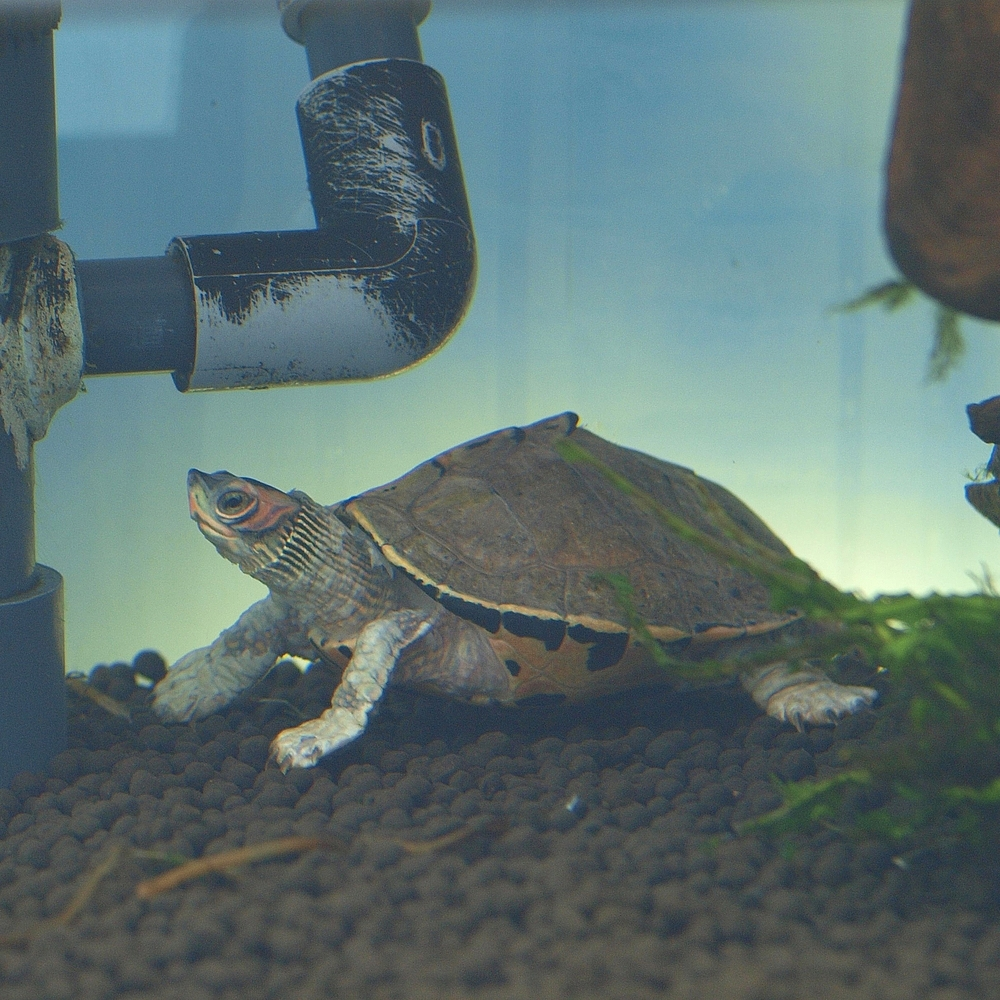
- Pangshura tecta, Indian roofed turtle

Scientific classification
- Kingdom: Animalia
- Phylum: Chordata
- Class: Reptilia
- Order: Testudines
- Suborder: Cryptodira
- Family: Geoemydidae
- Subfamily: Geoemydinae
- Genus: Pangshura; Gray, 1856

Species
- See text

= Pangshura =

Pangshura Temporal range: Pliocene–recent, 5.332–0 Ma

Genus of turtles

Pangshura is a genus of geoemydid turtles endemic to South Asia. Its member species were formerly in the obsolete genus Kachuga. A fifth member, Pangshura tatrotia, was described in 2010, but it is only known from Pliocene fossils.

== Species ==
The described species are:

- Pangshura smithii (Gray, 1863) – brown roofed turtle
- Pangshura sylhetensis Jerdon, 1870 – Assam roofed turtle
- Pangshura tecta (Gray, 1831) – Indian roofed turtle
- Pangshura tentoria (Gray, 1834) – Indian tent turtle
- † Pangshura tatrotia Joyce & Lyson, 2010 (fossil)

Nota bene: A binomial authority in parentheses indicates that the species was originally described in a genus other than Pangshura.
