= Erodonidae =

Scientific classification
- Domain: Eukaryota
- Kingdom: Animalia
- Phylum: Mollusca
- Class: Bivalvia
- Order: Myida
- Family: Erodonidae; Winckworth, 1932

Family of bivalves

Erodonidae is a family of bivalves belonging to the order Myida.

Genera:

- Erodona Bosc, 1801
- †Potamomya Sowerby, 1839
