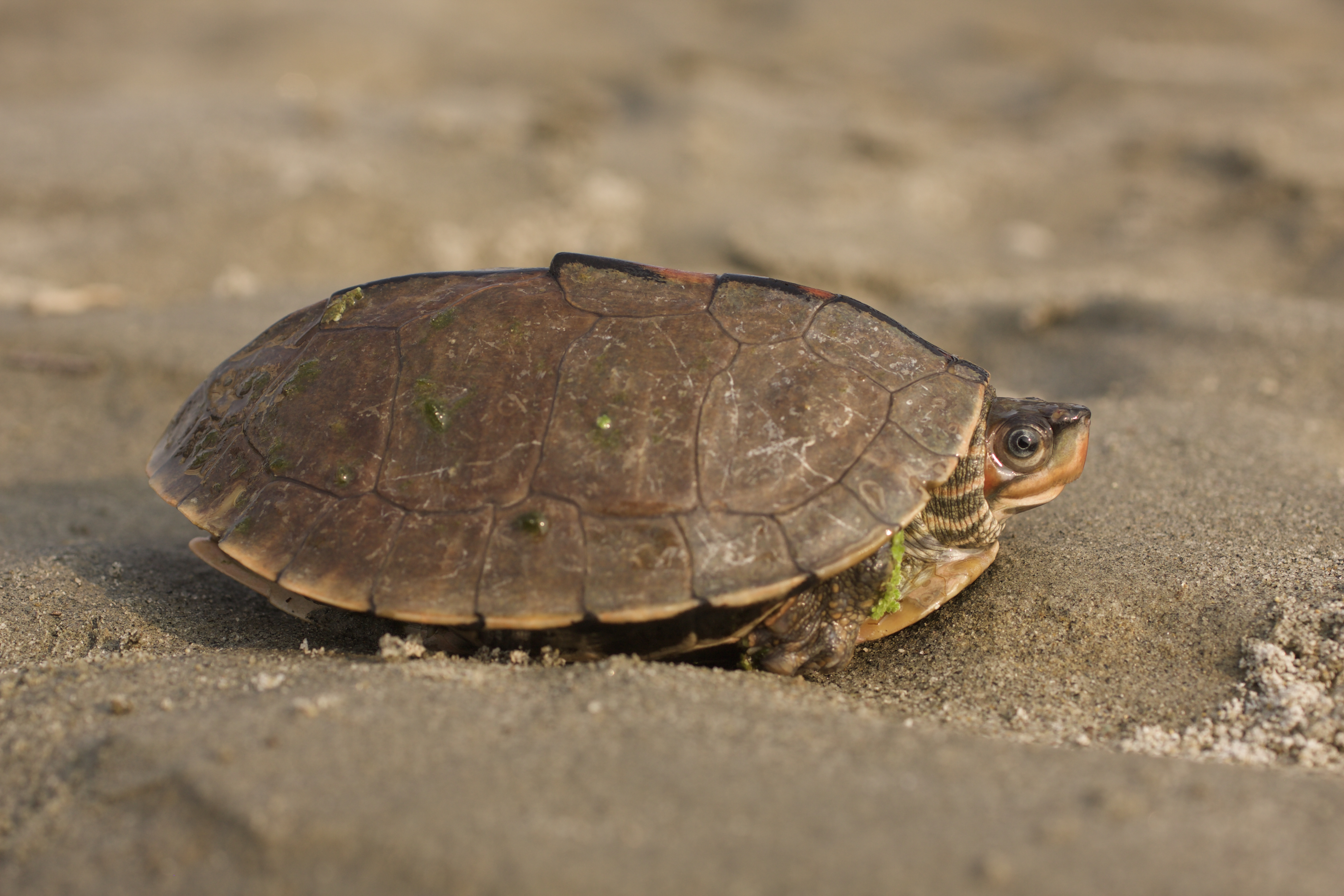

Conservation status
- Near Threatened (IUCN 3.1)
- CITES Appendix II

Scientific classification
- Kingdom: Animalia
- Phylum: Chordata
- Class: Reptilia
- Order: Testudines
- Suborder: Cryptodira
- Family: Geoemydidae
- Genus: Pangshura
- Species: P. smithii

Binomial name
- Pangshura smithii (Gray, 1863)

Synonyms
- Pangshura smithii smithii: Batagur smithii Gray, 1863; Pangshura smithii — Günther, 1864; Clemmys smithii — Strauch, 1865; Pangshura smith [sic] Theobald, 1868 (ex errore); Emia smithii — Gray, 1870; Kachuga smithii — Boulenger, 1889; Kachuga smithi [sic] M.A. Smith, 1931 (ex errore); Kachuga amithii [sic] Rudloff, 1974 (ex errore); Kachuga smithi smithi — Moll, 1987; Kachuga smithii smithii — Moll, 1987; Pangshura smithii smithii — Das, 2001; Pngshura [sic] smithii — Das, 2001; Pangshura smithi — Gurley, 2003; Pangshura smithi smithi — Joseph-Ouni, 2004; Pangshura smithii pallidipes: Kachuga smithii pallidipes Moll, 1987; Kachuga smithi pallidipes — van Dijk, 2000; Pangshura smithii pallidipes — Das, 2001; Pangshura smithi pallidipes — Joseph-Ouni, 2004

= Brown roofed turtle =

Species of turtle

The brown roofed turtle (Pangshura smithii) is a species of turtle in the family Geoemydidae. The species is endemic to South Asia. Two subspecies are recognized.

== Etymology ==
The specific name, smithii, is in honor of Scottish zoologist Andrew Smith.

== Description ==
The carapace of P. smithii is much depressed and feebly keeled. The nuchal shield is small, trapezoidal, and broadest posteriorly. The first vertebral has sinuous lateral borders and is usually a little narrower in front than behind. The second vertebral is shortest, broader than long, and usually with straight or slightly convex posterior border. The third vertebral is considerably longer than broad, subquadrangular, and its posterior border is straight or slightly convex. The fourth vertebral is longest, tapering anteriorly and forming a narrow suture with the third. The fifth vertebral is much broader than the others. The large plastron is feebly angulated laterally. The front lobe is rounded. The hind lobe is angularly notched and as long as or a little shorter than the width of the bridge. The longest median suture is that between the abdominals, which about equals the length of the front lobe. The gulars are usually shorter than the suture between the humerals, their suture with the latter shields forming a right angle. The inguinal is large, and the axillary is smaller. The head is moderate. The snout is short, obtuse, and feebly prominent. The jaws have denticulated edges. The upper jaw is not notched mesially. The alveolar surface of the upper jaw is broad, and the median ridge is nearer the inner than the outer border. There are bony choanae between the orbits. The width of the lower jaw at the symphysis is less than the diameter of the orbit. The fore limbs have large transverse scales. The carapace is pale olive-brown above, and the dorsal keel is usually blackish. The plastral shields and the lower surface of the marginals are dark brown, bordered with yellow. The straight-line carapace length is 8.5 in (22 cm).

Brown roofed turtles exhibit ZZ/ZW sex determination, in contrast to the temperature-dependent sex determination of most turtles.

== Subspecies and geographic ranges ==
Two subspecies are recognized, including the nominotypical subspecies.

- P. s. smithii (Gray, 1863), is found in the Indus, Ganges, and Brahmaputra River drainages in Bangladesh, India, and Pakistan.
- P. s. pallidipes (Moll, 1987), is found in the northern tributaries of the Ganges in India and Nepal.

== Habitat ==
The preferred natural habitats of P. smithii are freshwater swamps and rivers. These creatures also prefer to bask in the sun, twice a day. They often prefer muddy areas.
