= Cornus piggae =

Cornus piggae Temporal range: Late Paleocene

Scientific classification
- Kingdom: Plantae
- Clade: Tracheophytes
- Clade: Angiosperms
- Clade: Eudicots
- Clade: Asterids
- Order: Cornales
- Family: Cornaceae
- Genus: Cornus
- Subgenus: Cornus subg. Cornus
- Species: †C. piggae

Binomial name
- †Cornus piggae Manchester, Xiang, & Xiang, 2010

Extinct species of flowering plant

Cornus piggae is an extinct species of dogwood known from fossil fruits found in Late Paleocene sediments exposed in the US state of North Dakota. C. piggae is one of three extinct species placed in the Cornus subgenus Cornus based on fossil fruit morphology. The other two species, C. ettingshausenii and C. multilocularis are known from pyritized fruits found in sediments of the London Clay in England. C. piggae is the only North American fruit species yet described and is also the oldest described species in Cornus subgenus Cornus.

== History and classification ==
Cornus piggae is represented by a group of fifteen specimens from the Tiffanian aged Sentinel Butte Formation which outcrops in near the town of Almont, North Dakota and the Beicegal Creek, North Dakota. The age of the formation is based on the recovery of late Tiffanian mammals in the upper section of the formation along with the floral and palynological assemblages of the formation. Thirteen of the fossils were recovered from the University of Florida location 15722 at Almont while the remaining two are from location 18907 near Beicegal Creek.

The holotype specimen for Cornus piggae along with eight of the paratypes are currently preserved in the paleobotanical collections of the Field Museum of Natural History in Chicago, Illinois. Five of the Almont paratype specimens and one Beicegal Creek specimen are in the university of Florida Collections, with the remaining Almont specimen housed at the University of Wisconsin–Stevens Point and the second Beicegal Creek specimen in the Arizona State University collections. The specimens were studied by paleobotanist Steven R. Manchester of the university of Florida, and botanists Xiao-Ping Xiang of the Chinese Academy of Sciences, and Qiu-Yun (Jenny) Xiang of North Carolina State University. Manchester, Xiang, and Xiang published their 2010 type description for C. piggae in the International Journal of Plant Sciences. The etymology of the specific name piggae was derived from Professor Kathleen Pigg's name in honor of her contributions the field of paleobotany.

== Description ==
Fossil specimens of Cornus piggae contain two to three locules and range from 5–7 millimetres (0.20–0.28 in) wide by 5–10 millimetres (0.20–0.39 in) in length. Both the apex and base are smooth with no apical depressions present and the smooth exterior of the fruits lacks ribbing. The apex hosts two to three germination valves which correspond to the elongate locules. The cell structure of the endocarp indicates placement into Cornus, while subglobose chambers in the walls of the locules are seen only in the Cornus subgenus Cornus. The overall size of Cornus piggae is noted as distinctly smaller than the fruits of other living and extinct members in the subgenus.
