= Rasstrigin =

Rasstrigin Расстригин
- Khutor
- Location within Volgograd Oblast Location within Russia
- Coordinates: 49°30′N 44°59′E
- Country: Russia
- Region: Volgograd Oblast
- District: Dubovsky District
- Time zone: UTC+4:00

Rasstrigin (Russian: Расстригин) is a rural locality (a khutor) in Suvodskoye Rural Settlement, Dubovsky District, Volgograd Oblast, Russia. The population was 66 as of 2010. There is 1 street.

== Geography ==
The village is located in steppe, on the right bank of the Beryozovaya River, 50 km NNE from Dubovka.
