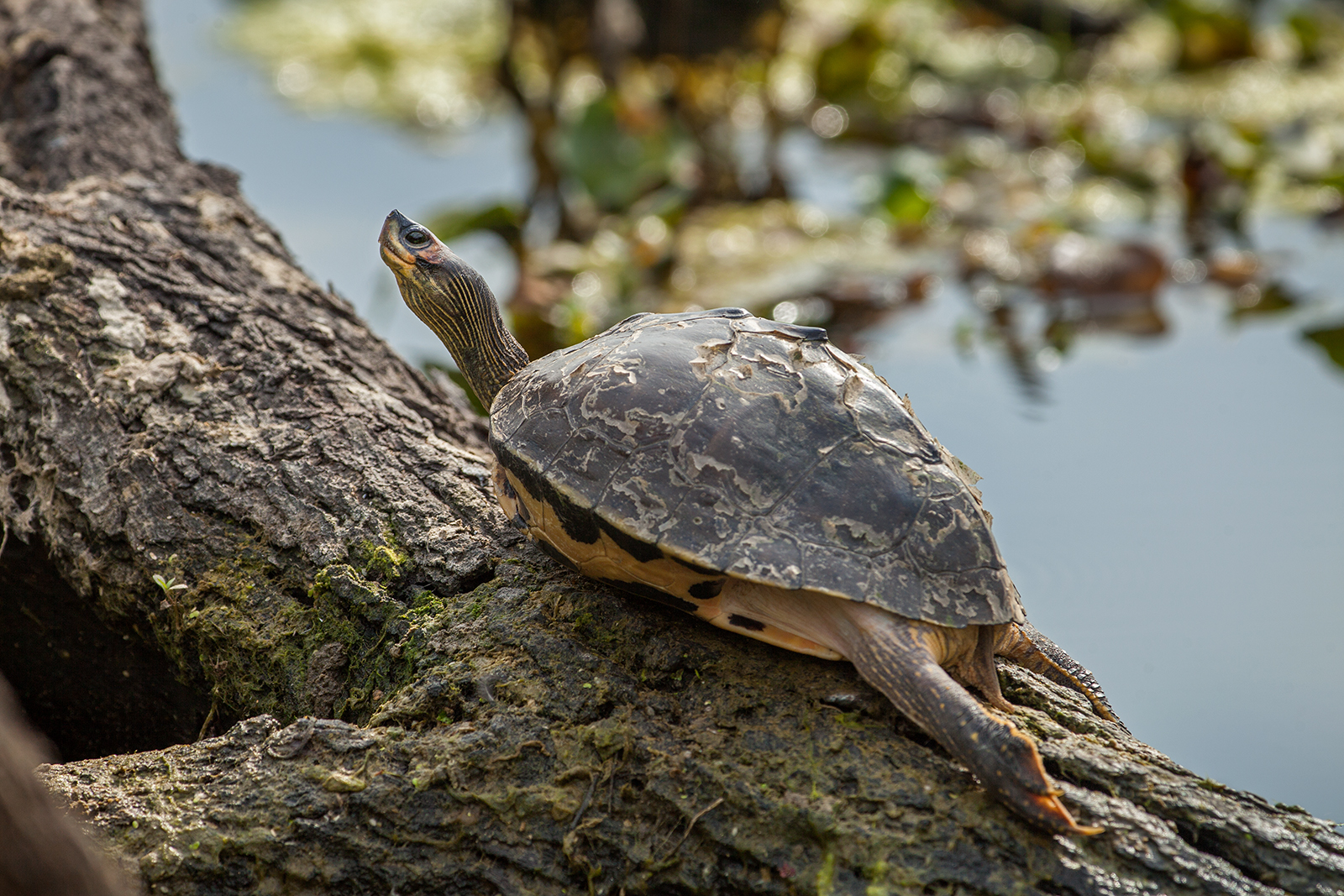
- Indian roofed turtle in KNP Bharatpur

Conservation status
- Vulnerable (IUCN 3.1)
- CITES Appendix I

Scientific classification
- Kingdom: Animalia
- Phylum: Chordata
- Class: Reptilia
- Order: Testudines
- Suborder: Cryptodira
- Family: Geoemydidae
- Genus: Pangshura
- Species: P. tecta

Binomial name
- Pangshura tecta (Gray, 1831)

Synonyms
- List: Emys tectum Gray, 1830; Emys tecta Gray, 1831; Testudo dura Hamilton, 1831 (nomen nudum); Testudo katuya Hamilton, 1831 (nomen nudum); Testudo khagraskata Hamilton, 1831 (nomen nudum); Emys trigibbosa Lesson, 1831; Clemmys (Clemmys) tecta Fitzinger, 1835; Batagur (Pangshura) tecta Gray, 1856; Emys namadicus Theobald, 1860 (nomen nudum); Clemmys tectum Strauch, 1862; Pangshura tecta Günther, 1864; Pangshura tectum Theobald, 1868; Pangshura dura Gray, 1869; Pangshura ventricosa Gray, 1870; Emys namadica Boulenger, 1889; Kachuga tectum Boulenger, 1889; Kachuga tecta Lindholm, 1929; Kachuga tectum tectum Smith, 1931; Kachuga tecta tecta Mertens, Müller & Rust, 1934

= Indian roofed turtle =

Species of turtle

The Indian roofed turtle (Pangshura tecta) is a species of turtle in the family Geoemydidae. It can be distinguished by the distinct "roof" at the topmost part of the shell. It is found in the major rivers of South Asia. It is a common pet in the Indian Subcontinent.

== Description ==
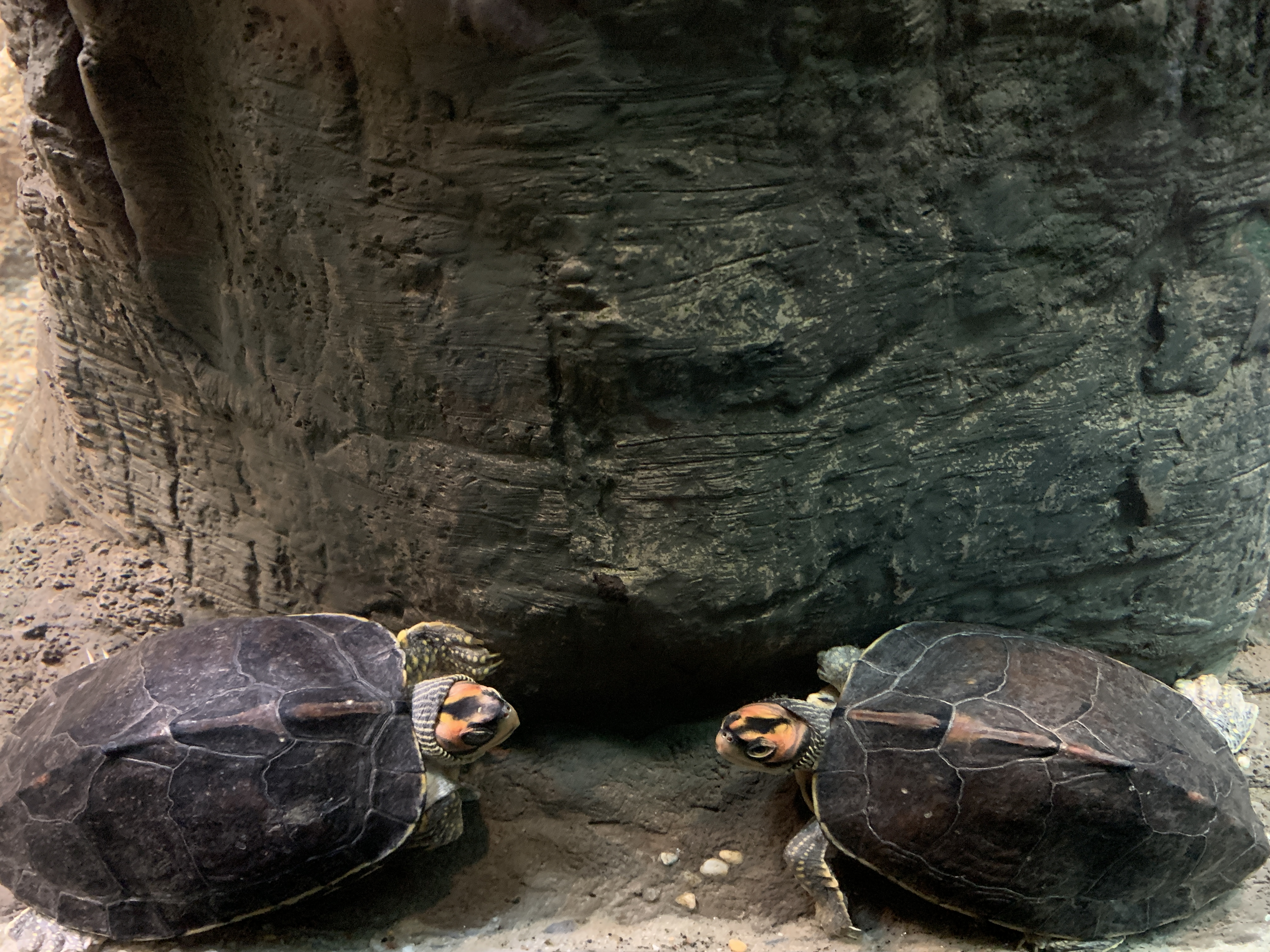
Indian roofed turtles at the Bronx Zoo.

Carapace elevated, tectiform, the keel; ending in a nodosity on the third vertebral shield; posterior margin not or but very slightly serrated; nuchal shield small, square or trapezoidal; first vertebral very variable in shape, usually with straight lateral borders diverging forwards in the half-grown specimens, narrower in front and with sinuous lateral borders in the adult; second vertebral as long as or a little longer than second, frequently obtusely pointed behind; third vertebral pointed behind, in contact with the point of the very elongate fourth; fifth vertebral broader than the others. Plastron large, strongly angulated laterally in the young, truncate anteriorly, angularly notched posteriorly; proportions of plastral shields very variable; suture between gulars and humerals forming a right angle; axillary and inguinal large. Head moderate; snout short, rather pointed and prominent; jaws with denticulated edge, upper not notched mesially; alveolar surface of upper jaw with the median ridge nearer the inner than the outer border; bony choanae between the orbits; the width of the lower jaw at the symphysis is less than the diameter of the orbit. Fore limbs with large transverse scales. Carapace olive, that of young with some black spots, especially on the posterior edge of the first three vertebrals; an orange vertebral band and a narrow yellow margin; carapace more uniform in the adult; plastron orange or red, with black spots, or brown with a yellowish anterior and lateral border to each shield, in one specimen uniform yellow. Head blackish; jaws and sides of crown orange; neck with numerous yellow lines on a blackish ground; limbs dark olive, spotted with yellow. Length of shell up to nearly 9 inches.

== Recognition ==
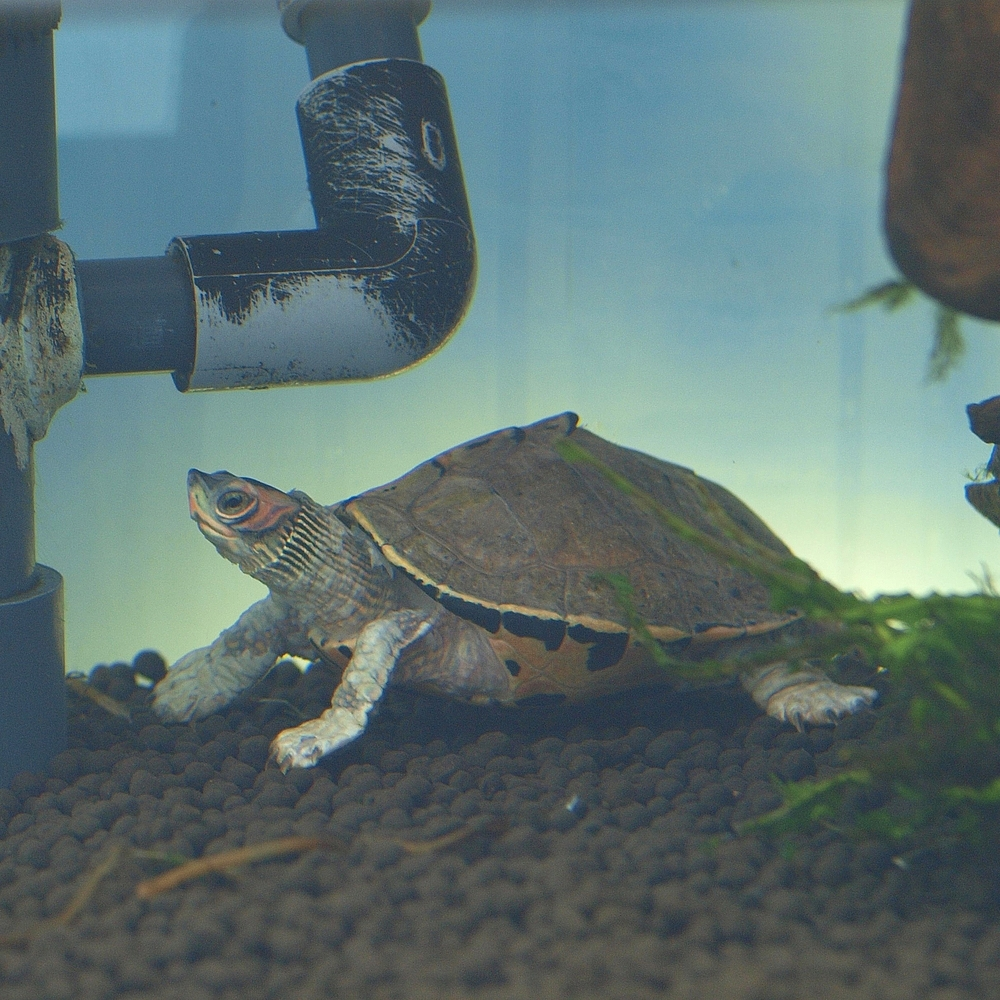
Indian roofed turtle.

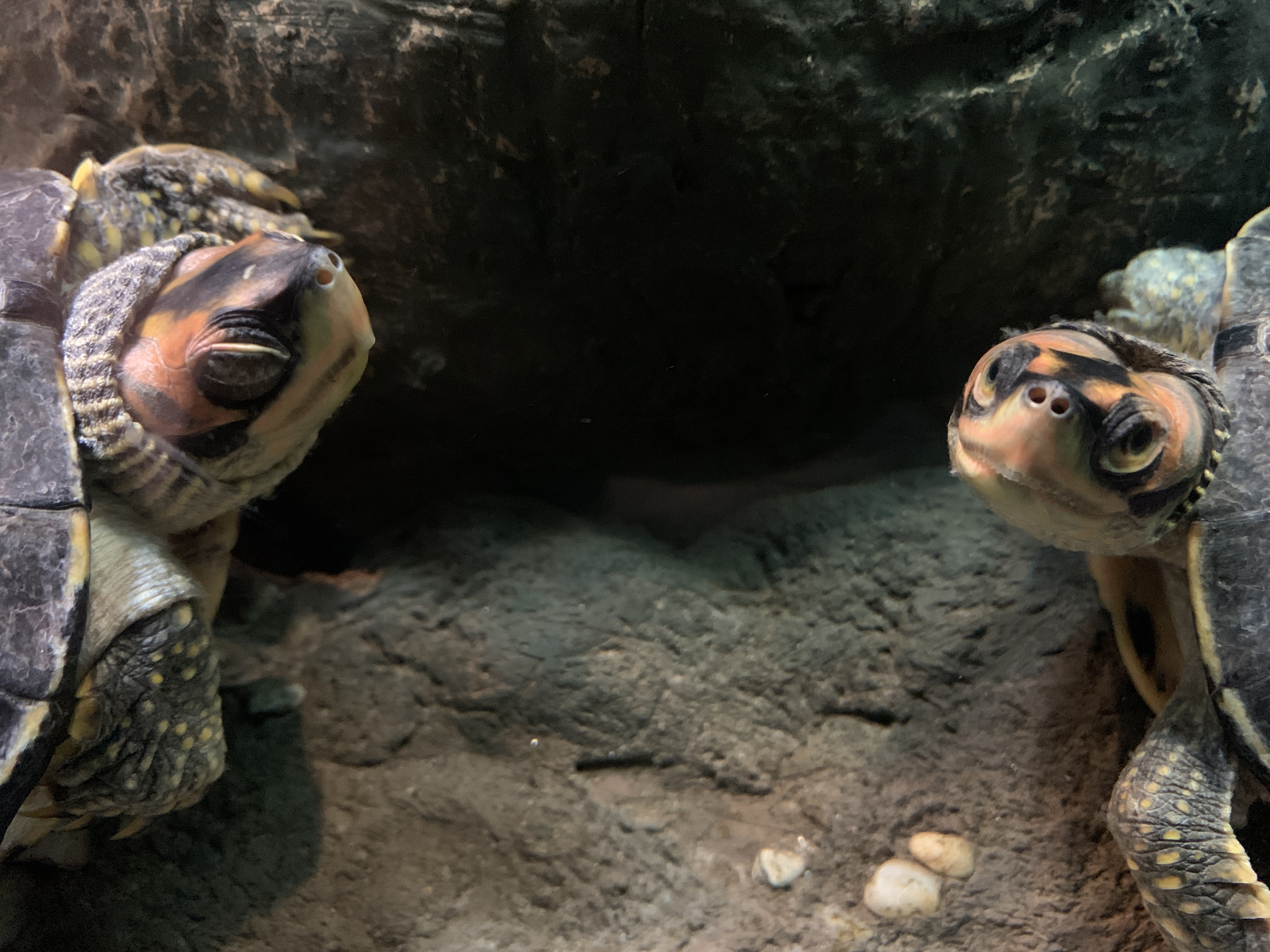
Bronx Zoo.

The arched, elliptical carapace (to 23 cm) is widest behind the middle and unserrated posteriorly. The medial keel is prominent with a strong spinelike posterior projection on the 3rd vertebral. Vertebrals 2 and 5 are broader than long, while 1, 3, and 4 are longer than broad. Vertebral 3 is posteriorly pointed while the 4th is anteriorly pointed, making the seam between these two scutes very short. The carapace is brown, sometimes yellow or orange bordered, with a red to orange medial stripe. The plastron is long and narrow; the forelobe is much shorter than the broad bridge, and the hindlobe is slightly shorter than the bridge and contains a posterior anal notch. The humero-pectoral seam joins the plastral seam at an obtuse angle. The plastral formula is: abd > fem > an >< hum > pect >< gul. On the bridge, the inguinal and axillary scutes are nearly equal in length, or the inguinal is slightly larger. Plastron and bridge are yellow with at least two black elongated blotches on each scute, except the gulars and anals which have only a single blotch. The head is moderate in size with a projecting, short, pointed snout. Its upper jaw is not medially notched. Skin on the back of the head is divided into large scales. Dorsally, the head is black with a large crescent-shaped, orange to yellowish red blotch on each temple (these may unite posteriorly to form a V-shaped mark). The jaws are yellow, and the neck is black with numerous yellow stripes. Limbs are olive to gray, and spotted and bordered with yellow. They have large transverse scales. The karyotype is 2n = 52; 20 metacentric and submetacentric, 10 subtelocentric, and 22 acrocentric and telocentric chromosomes Males are brighter in color than females, and have long, thick tails with the vent beyond the carapacial rim. Females have short tails with the vent under the carapace. Females grow larger than males.

== Habitat ==
This is a quiet-water turtle, occurring in quiet streams, canals, oxbows, ponds, and man-made water tanks. It also occurs in brackish coastal waters. A soft bottom and abundant aquatic vegetation are preferred conditions. It loves basking in the early morning sun. Basking helps the turtle to maintain its body temperature as well as for the synthesis of Vitamin D.

== Breeding ==
Baby

Male P. tecta develop a small tubercle at the end of the thick tail during October, just before the breeding season, and shed it in March. This tubercle may help in probing the females cloacal vent during courtship. During courtship the male swims along the females side and may also circle her. Nesting has been reported in October, December, January and February, and February and March; eggs were found in January and in March. P. tecta in Bangladesh may oviposit in two separate periods, from the beginning of December to mid-January and from mid-February to the end of March. A nest cavity 14–20 cm deep is usually dug. Clutches contain 3-14 elongated (35-45 x 21–29 mm) eggs. There are reports of clutches with a maximum of 15 ovoid (50-51 x 20–21 mm), white eggs, that tend to become bluish at hatching time. The natural incubation period lasts 70–144 days. Hatchlings have 34.1-35.2 mm carapaces and weigh 7 g; This species is omnivorous, feeding on aquatic plants, like water hyacinths and weeds, and animal prey such as crabs and snails; it also scavenges.

==Distribution== Pangshura tecta inhabits the Ganges, Brahmaputra, Indus, himalayan region of rajouri >and Mahanadi river drainages in Pakistan, northern and peninsular India, and Bangladesh.
