= Pangshura tatrotia =

Pangshura tatrotia Temporal range: Early Pliocene, 5.332–3.6 Ma

Scientific classification
- Kingdom: Animalia
- Phylum: Chordata
- Class: Reptilia
- Order: Testudines
- Suborder: Cryptodira
- Family: Geoemydidae
- Genus: Pangshura
- Species: †P. tatrotia

Binomial name
- †Pangshura tatrotia Joyce & Lyson, 2010

Extinct species of turtle

Pangshura tatrotia is an extinct species of turtle belonging to the family Geoemydidae. It is known from the Early Pliocene of the Tatrot Formation near Padhri in Pakistan. It is known from a single specimen, a fossil shell collected in 1932 or 1933 by a Yale University expedition. It is similar to living species of Pangshura, but differs in details of shell anatomy.
