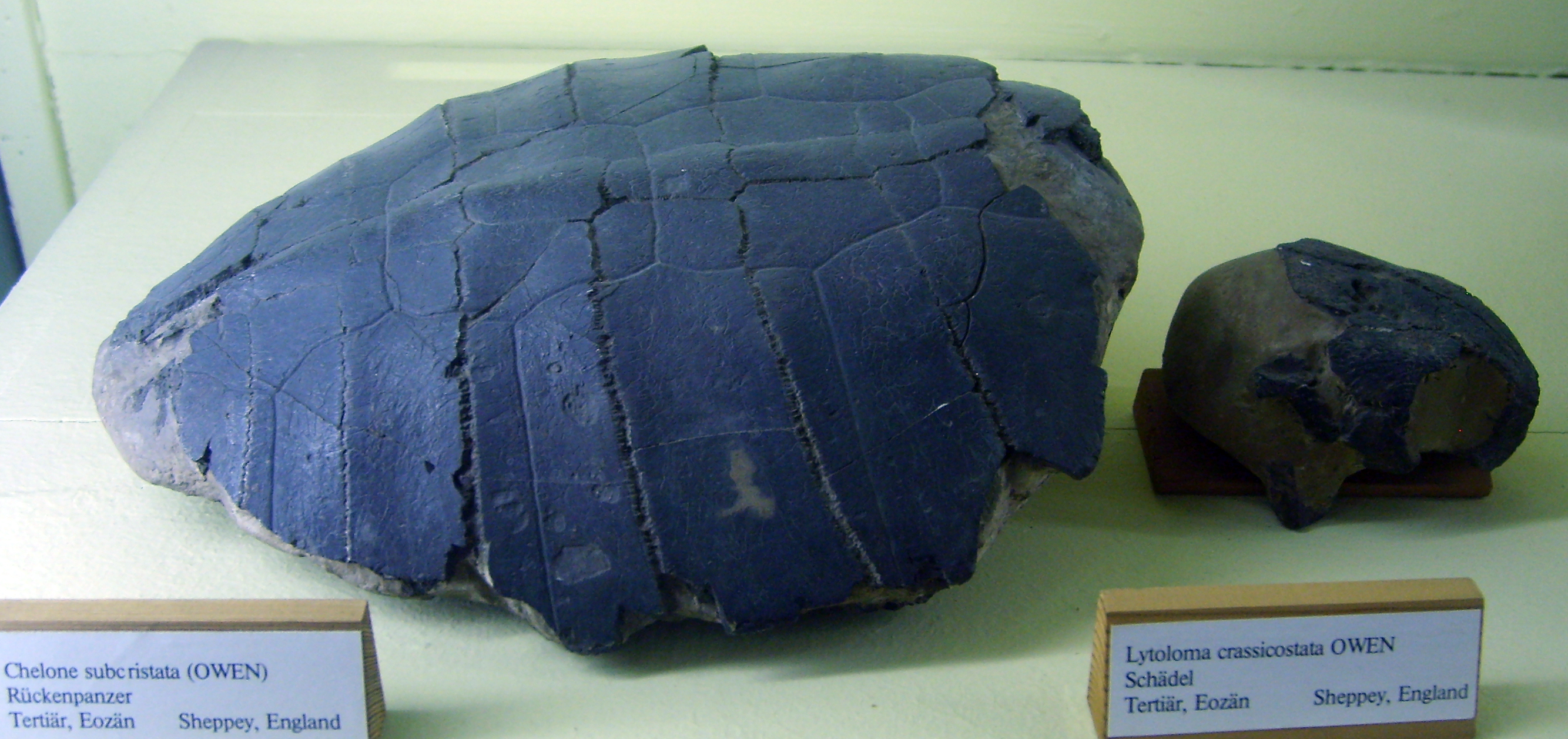
- Shell of Argillochelys subcristata and skull of Glossochelys, at the Museum für Naturkunde, Berlin

Scientific classification
- Kingdom: Animalia
- Phylum: Chordata
- Class: Reptilia
- Order: Testudines
- Suborder: Cryptodira
- Clade: Pancheloniidae
- Genus: †Argillochelys; Lydekker, 1889

= Argillochelys =

Argillochelys Temporal range: Middle-Late Eocene

Extinct genus of turtles

Argillochelys is an extinct genus of sea turtle from the middle to lower Eocene in what is now the island of Great Britain. It was first named by Lydekker in 1889.

A species, A. africana, was found in Morocco, and described in 2008 by Tong & Hirayama.

Another species, A. foveopalatus, was found in Kazakhstan, and described in 2026 by Danilov et al.
