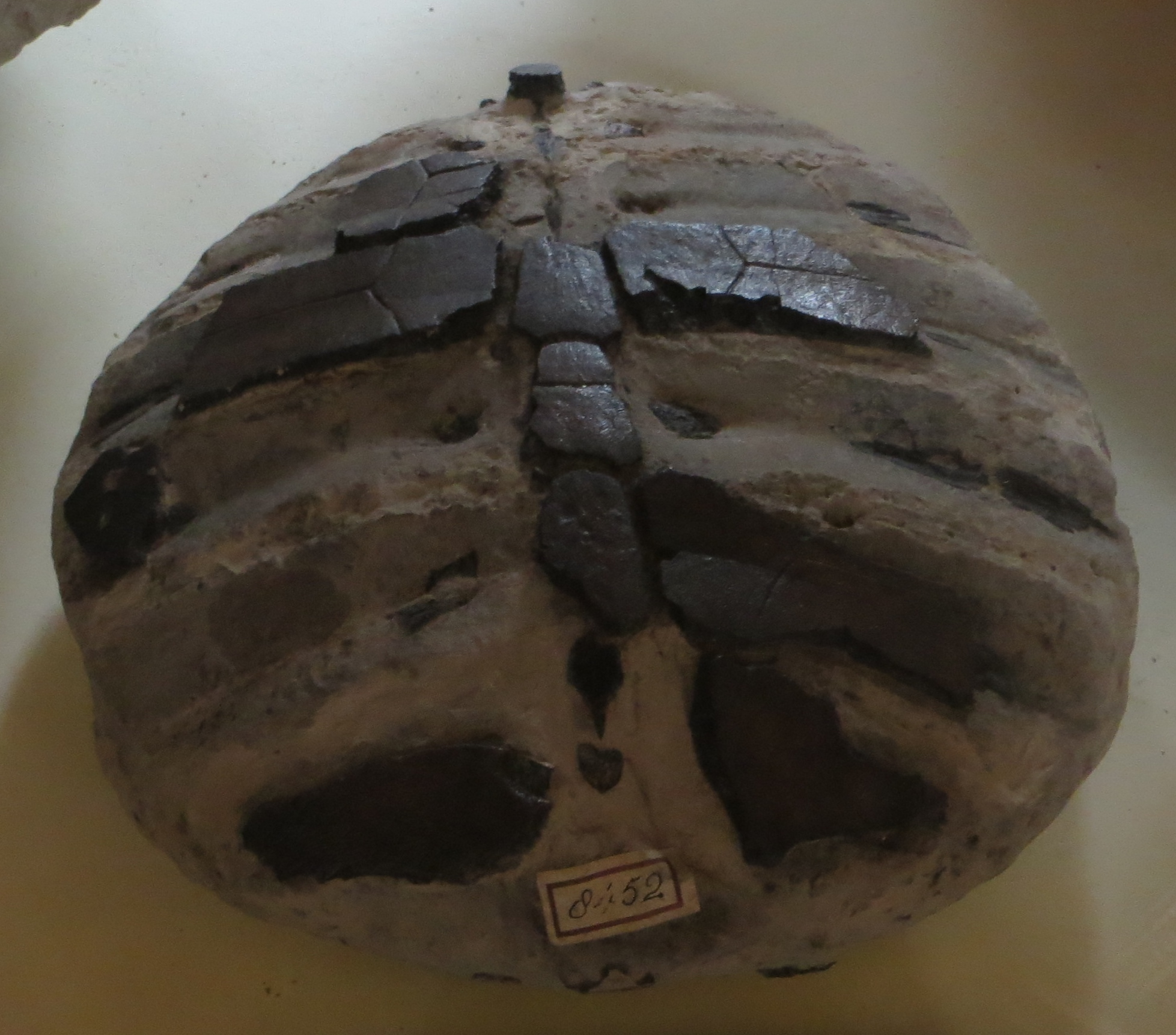
- P. camperi fossil on display at the Teylers Museum

Scientific classification
- Kingdom: Animalia
- Phylum: Chordata
- Class: Reptilia
- Order: Testudines
- Suborder: Cryptodira
- Clade: Pancheloniidae
- Genus: †Puppigerus; Cope 1870

Species
- †P. breviceps (Owen, 1841); †P. camperi (Gray, 1831); †P. grandaevus (Leidy, 1861); †P. parvisecta Cope, 1870

= Puppigerus =

Puppigerus Temporal range: Eocene, 50 Ma

Extinct genus of turtles

Puppigerus is an extinct genus of sea turtle from the Eocene. It is known from finds in the United States, the United Kingdom, Belgium, Denmark, and Uzbekistan.

== Taxonomy ==
Puppigerus was described by Edward Drinker Cope in 1870. As of 1997, P. camperi and P. crassicostata were considered the two valid species. In 2005 P. nessovi was discovered in Uzbekistan.

== Description ==
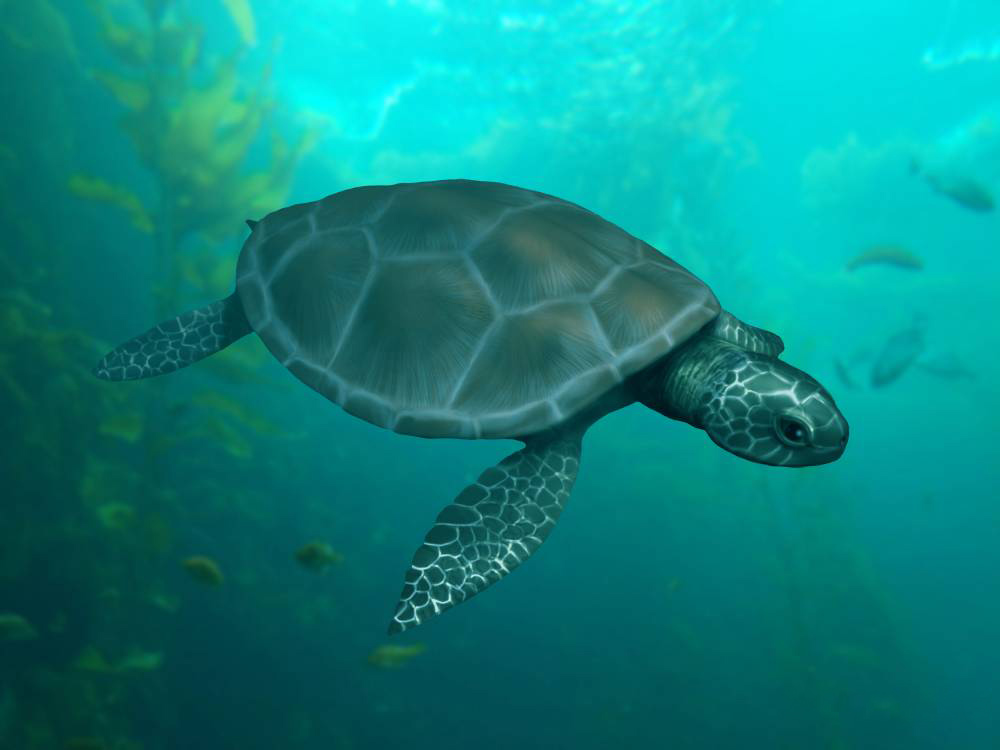
Restoration of P. camperi

Fossils show that Puppigerus was around 90 cm (35 in) long, and its weight has been estimated as being somewhere around 9–14 kg (20–31 lb). Although cheloniids such as Puppigerus first appeared during the Cretaceous, several traits of this genus give it more of a resemblance to modern cheloniids: its "huge" eyes pointed sideways rather than upward, unlike more primitive cheloniids, and its shell was completely ossified. The pygal (rearmost plate of the upper shell) also lacked the notch seen in earlier cheloniids. It was a herbivore, living on marine vegetation, and one of the "best-adapted" prehistoric turtles; its "unusually large" eyes helped it gather as much light as possible, and its specialized jaw structure kept it from accidentally breathing in water. Its front legs were flipper-like, but its hind legs were not developed in this manner, suggesting it would have spent considerable time on dry land, where females would have laid their eggs.

== Palaeoecology ==
Puppigerus camperi is known from the London Clay and Bracklesham Beds of England, as well as the Sables de Bruxelles and the Sables de Wemmel of Belgium. P. nessovi is known from the Dzheroi 2 locality of Uzbekistan. A Puppigerus species is also known from the Fur Formation of Denmark.
