= Ocetá Páramo =

Ecosystem in Colombia

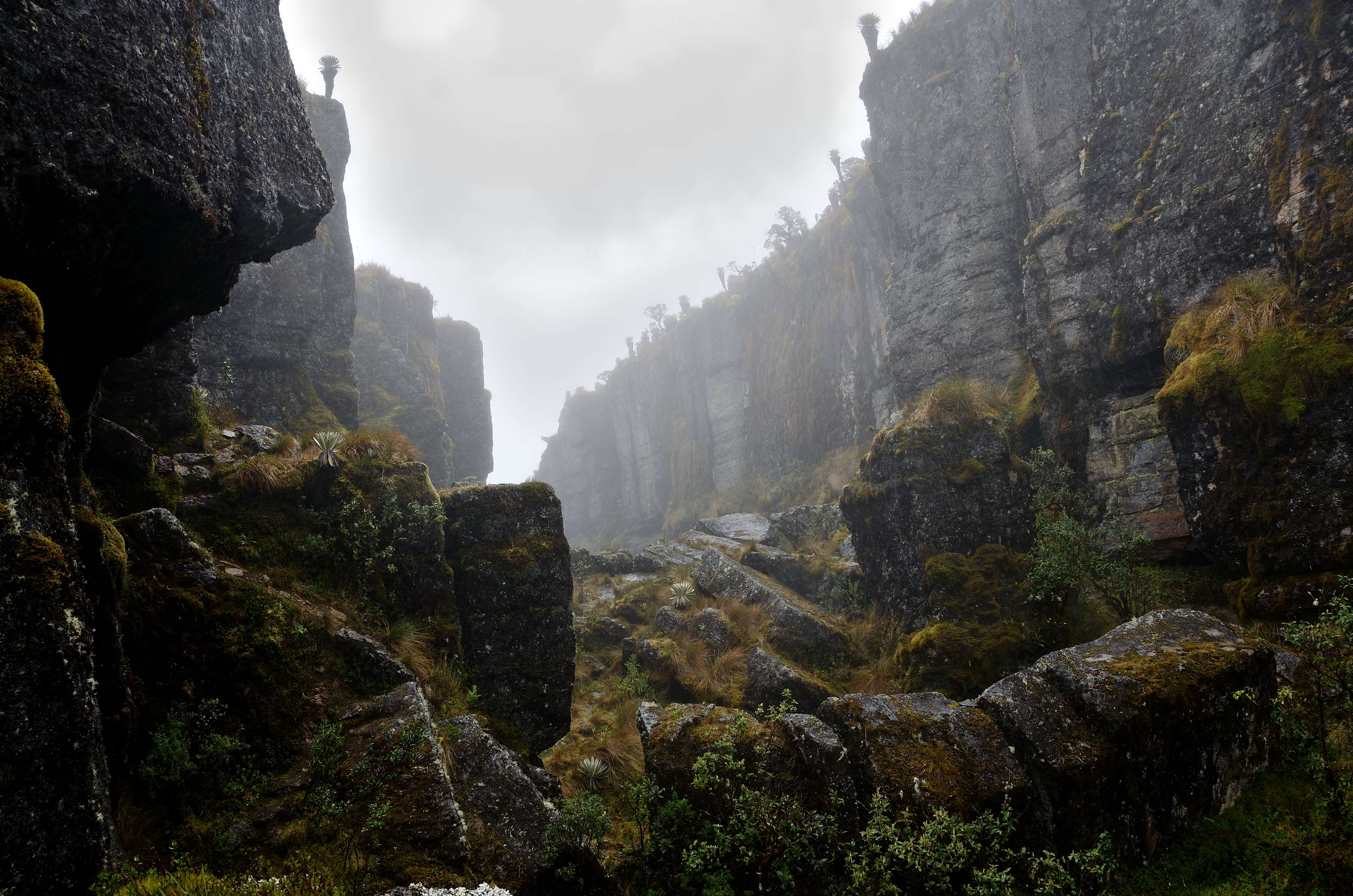
- Ciudad de Piedra and frailejones on the Ocetá Páramo

Ecology
- Realm: Neotropic
- Biome: Páramo
- Borders: Pisba National Natural Park; Siscuinsí Lake
- Animals: Andean condor, black agouti, eastern cottontail, mountain paca, spectacled bear, white-tailed deer

Geography
- Area: 57.711 km^{2} (22.282 sq mi)
- Country: Colombia
- State: Monguí, Mongua, Tópaga; Sugamuxi Province, Boyacá
- Elevation: 2,950 metres (9,680 ft) to 3,950 metres (12,960 ft)
- Coordinates: 5°42′39.5″N 72°47′52.2″W
- Geology: Paleocene: Socha Formation; Cretaceous: Guaduas, Guadalupe & Chipaque Formations; Basin: El Cocuy sub-basin Orogen: Eastern Ranges; Mountain range: Andes
- Rivers: Calicanto, Morro & Tejar Rivers
- Climate type: Cf

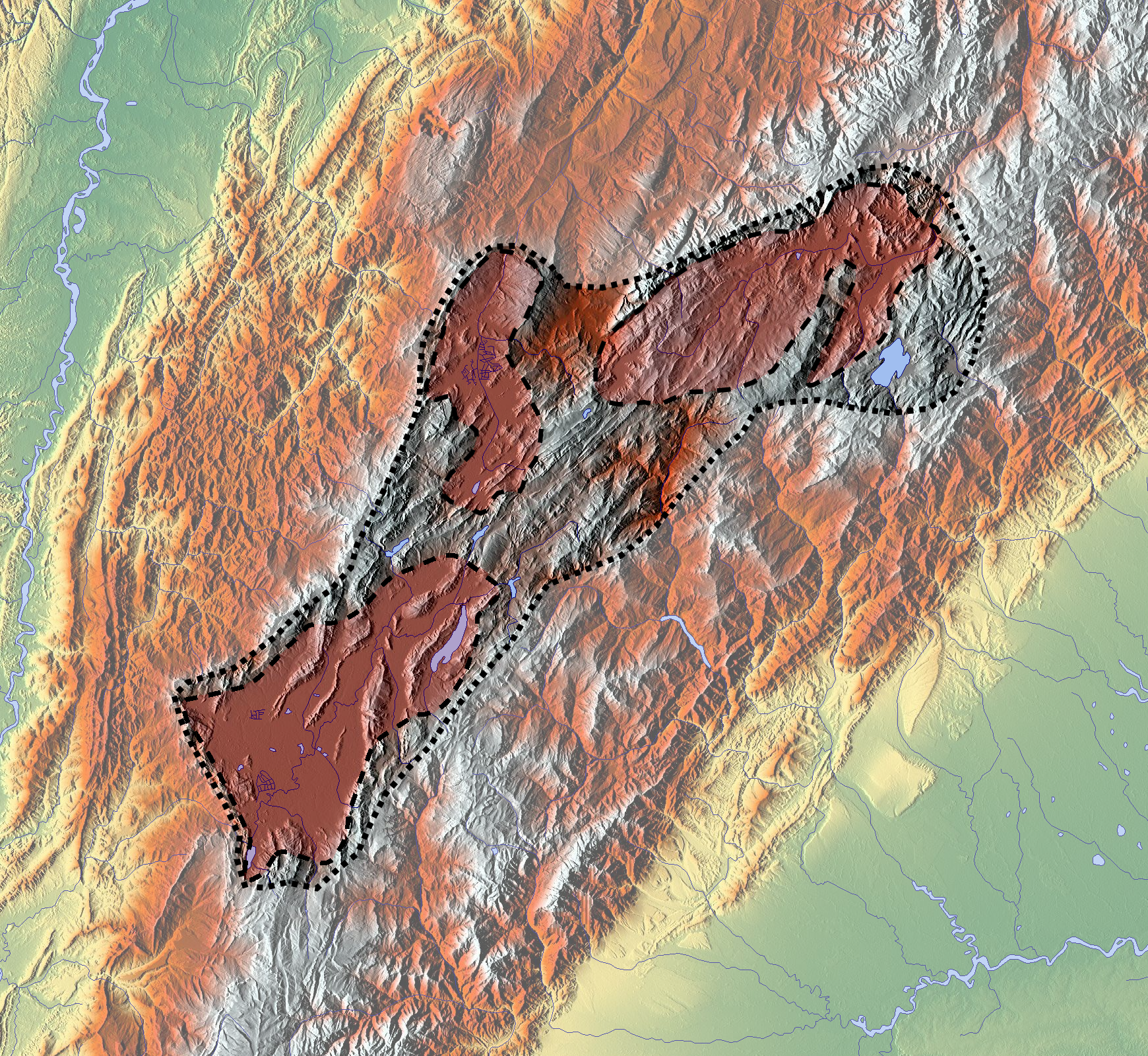
Location of Ocetá Páramo on the Altiplano Cundiboyacense

The Ocetá Páramo (Spanish: Páramo de Ocetá) is a páramo, which means an ecosystem above the continuous forest line yet below the permanent snowline. This particular páramo is located at altitudes between 2,950 metres (9,680 ft) and 3,950 metres (12,960 ft) in the Eastern Ranges of the Colombian Andes. It covers parts of the municipalities Monguí, Mongua and Tópaga, belonging to the Sugamuxi Province, Boyacá. The Ocetá Páramo is known for its collection of small shrubs called frailejones, as well as other Andean flora and fauna. Hiking tours from Monguí or Mongua to the páramo take a full day.

The Páramo de Ocetá in the times before the Spanish conquest of the Muisca was inhabited by the Muisca, loyal to the iraca of Suamox, who considered the region sacred. Myths and legends exist from pre-Columbian and Spanish colonial times and in the lower part of the páramo the Muisca women gave birth in little man-made pools (Tortolitas).

The Ocetá Páramo is considered the most beautiful páramo in the world and one of the treasures of Colombia.

== Description ==
The Ocetá Páramo is considered the most beautiful páramo in the world and one of the national treasures of Colombia. It is located at 230 kilometres (140 mi) from the Colombian capital Bogotá and 93 kilometres (58 mi) from the departmental capital Tunja. Colombia is the country with the most páramos in the world; more than 60% of the Andean ecosystem is found within Colombian territories. Boyacá is the department where 18.3% of the national total area is located.

=== Geography and climate ===
The Ocetá Páramo is situated in the Eastern Ranges of the Colombian Andes at altitudes between 2,950 metres (9,680 ft) and 3,950 metres (12,960 ft). The páramo with an area of 5,771.1 hectares (14,261 acres) lies east of the Altiplano Cundiboyacense, southwest of the Pisba National Natural Park and north of Siscuinsí Lake. Farther to the northeast are the Sierra Nevada del Cocuy and to the southwest Lake Tota. The climate varies between 0 °C (32 °F) in winter nights and 17 °C (63 °F) on sunny days. Foggy blankets are common in the area.

Páramos are "sponges"; sources of water for lower lying terrains and the Ocetá Páramo is no exception. In the upper part of the páramo, marshes and small lakes exist. The biggest waterbody is the Laguna Negra and the Calicanto, Tejar and Morro Rivers as well as numerous creeks (quebradas) have their origin on the Páramo de Ocetá. The Penagos waterfall feeds the Laguna Negra.

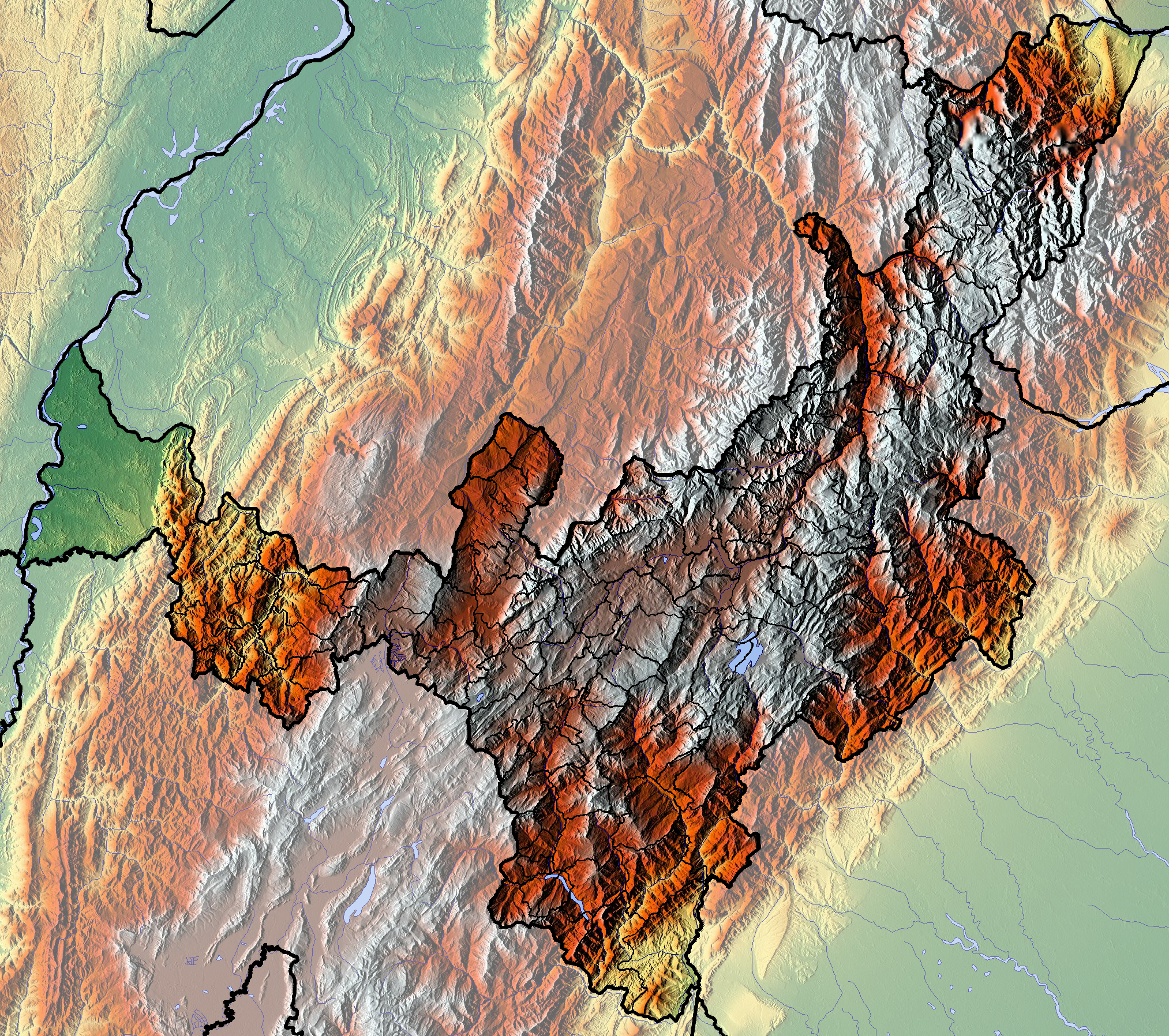
Topography of Boyacá

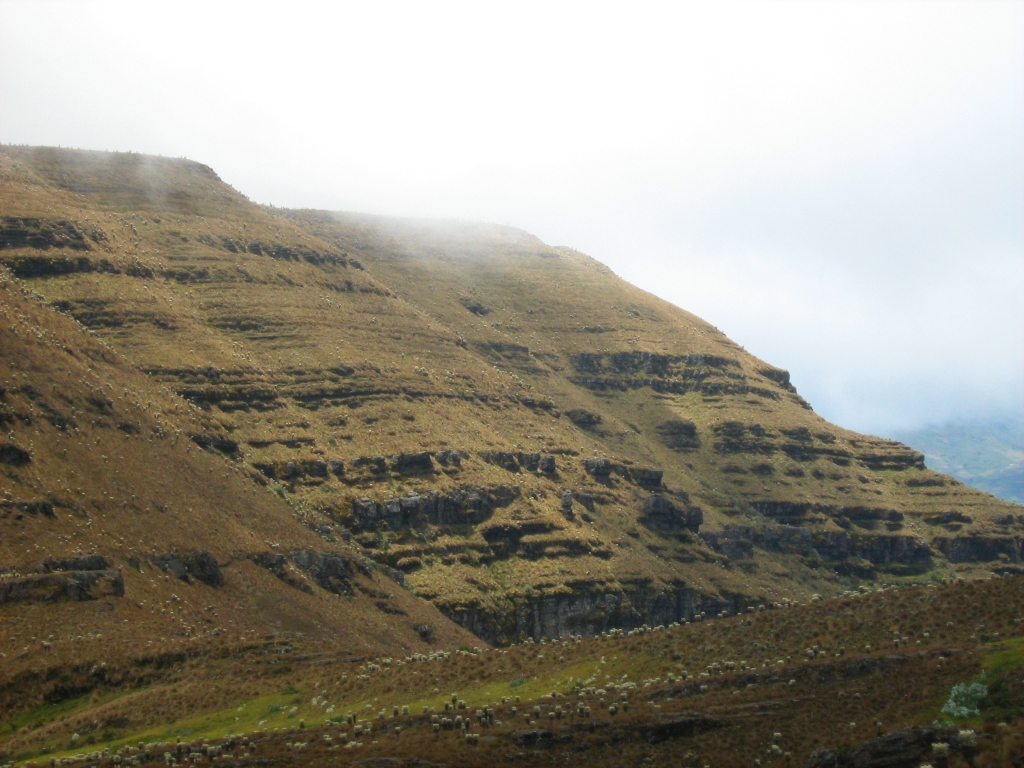
Fog at the Ocetá Páramo

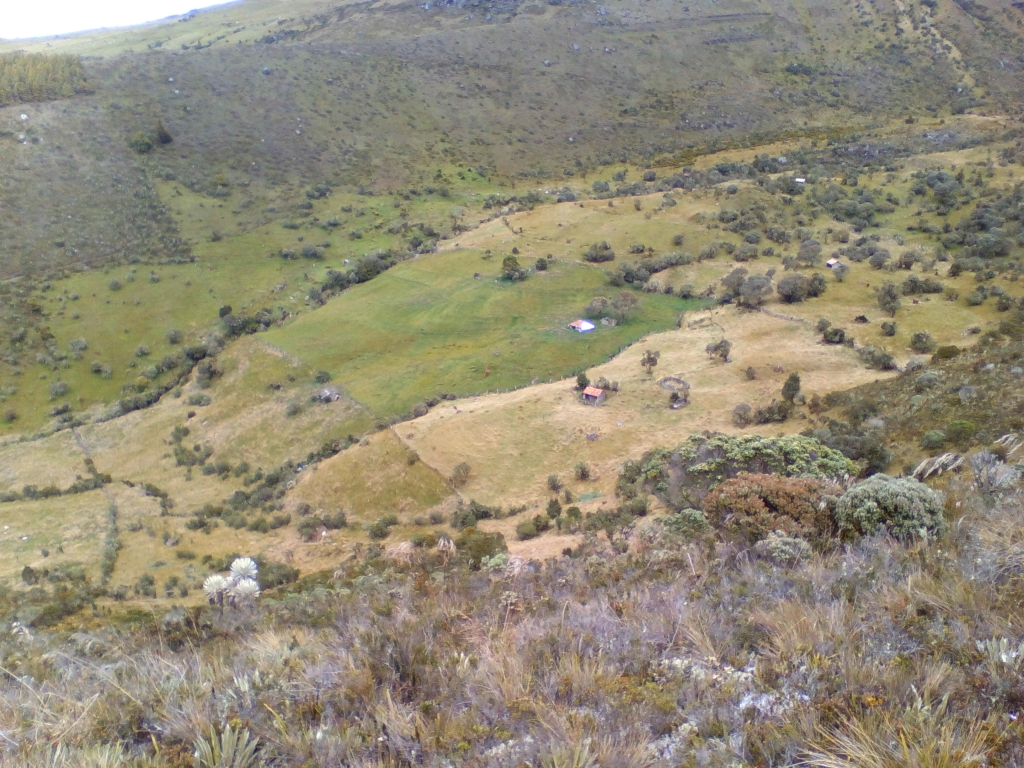
Creeks on the páramo

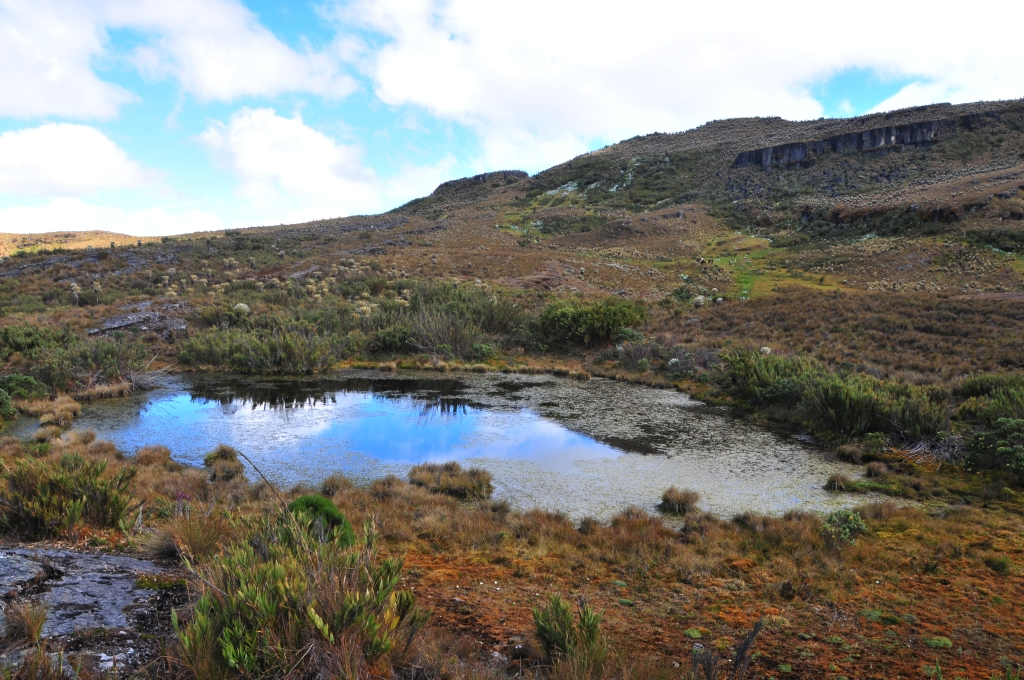
Marshes in Ocetá

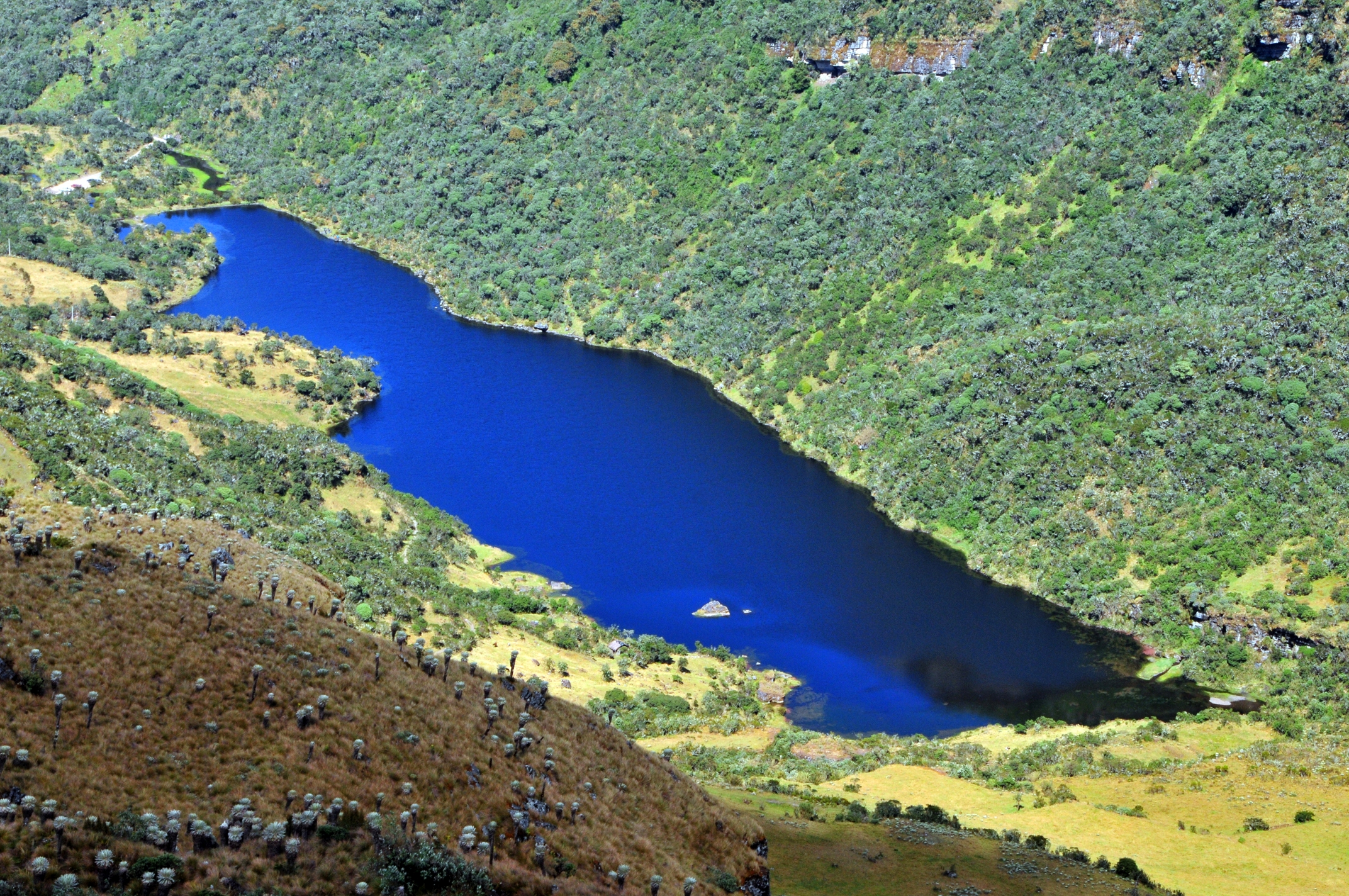
Laguna Negra

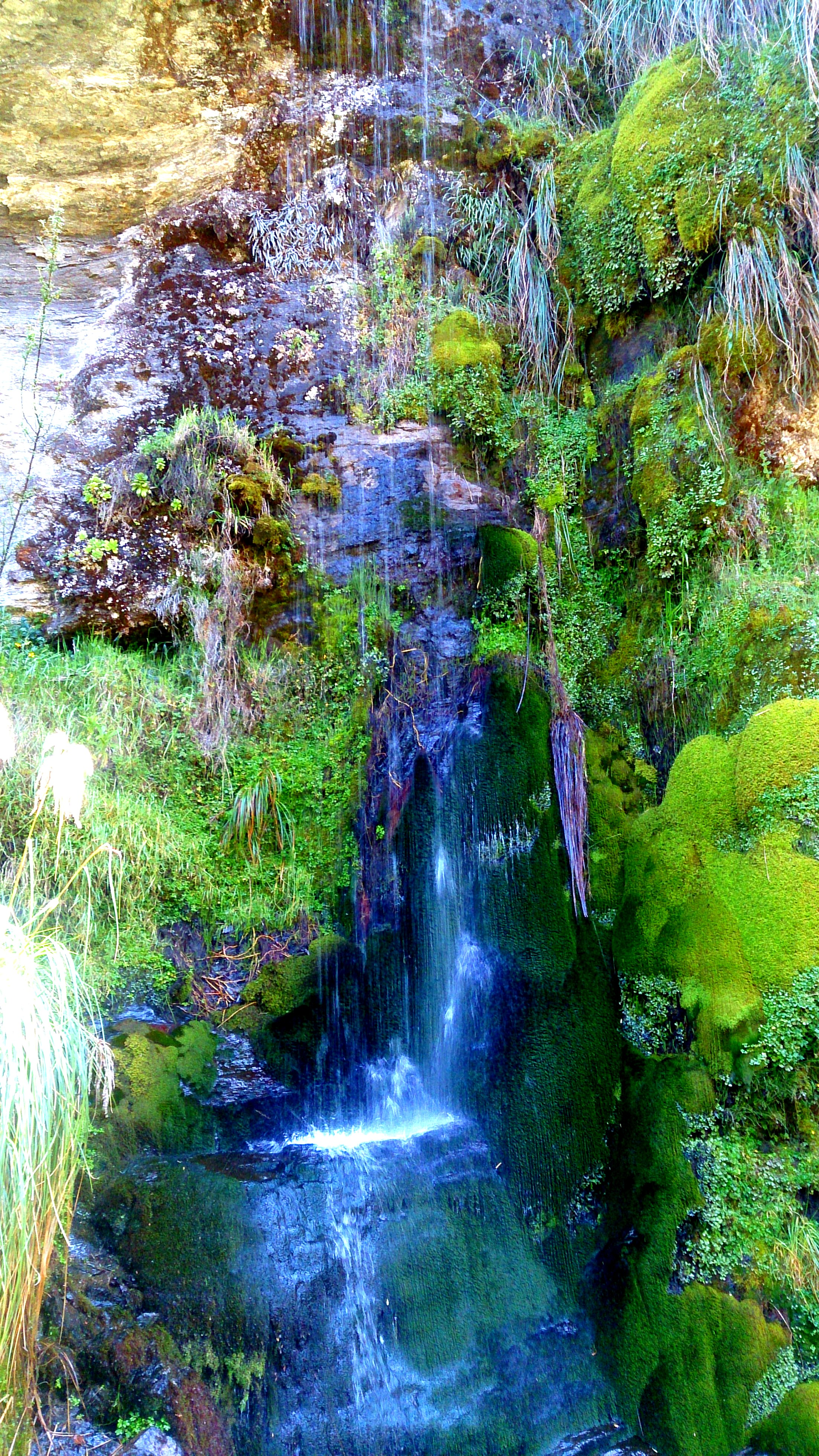
Penagos waterfall

=== Geology ===
The Ocetá Páramo is part of the El Cocuy sub-basin, an inverted basin in the Eastern Ranges. During the Hauterivian, the El Cocuy and Tablazo sub-basins formed a continuous basin due to the flooding of the Santander-Floresta paleohigh. The main uplift in the Eastern Ranges occurred between the late Oligocene and Pleistocene, with increased tectonic uplift in the Plio-Pleistocene. The Neogene compression led to the formation of alluvial fans in the intermontane valleys of the Eastern Cordillera. Pollen analysis has shown the transition from lowland tropical forests to colder mountainous vegetation over the last 5 million years. The youngest uplifted eastern chain of the Colombian Andes formed the provenance area for the Magdalena River. In the vicinity of the area of Ocetá, to the southwest in Iza and Paipa for the Eastern Cordillera unique volcanic and magmatic activity is noted from 4.7 to 2.1 Ma.

The stratigraphical units encountered on the Ocetá Páramo are Paleocene sandstones and shales of the Socha Formation in the Peña de Ortí, and the Late Cretaceous Guadalupe sandstone and shale formations, Guaduas Formation, and the organic shales of the Chipaque Formation. The Guaduas Formation contains coal seams that are mined in the area. The Cretaceous-Paleocene Guaduas Formation is the most important source for the rich coal deposits in the Andean interior of Colombia.

During the Miocene, establishing the current ecosystem in the Pliocene, the vegetation became that of a páramo.

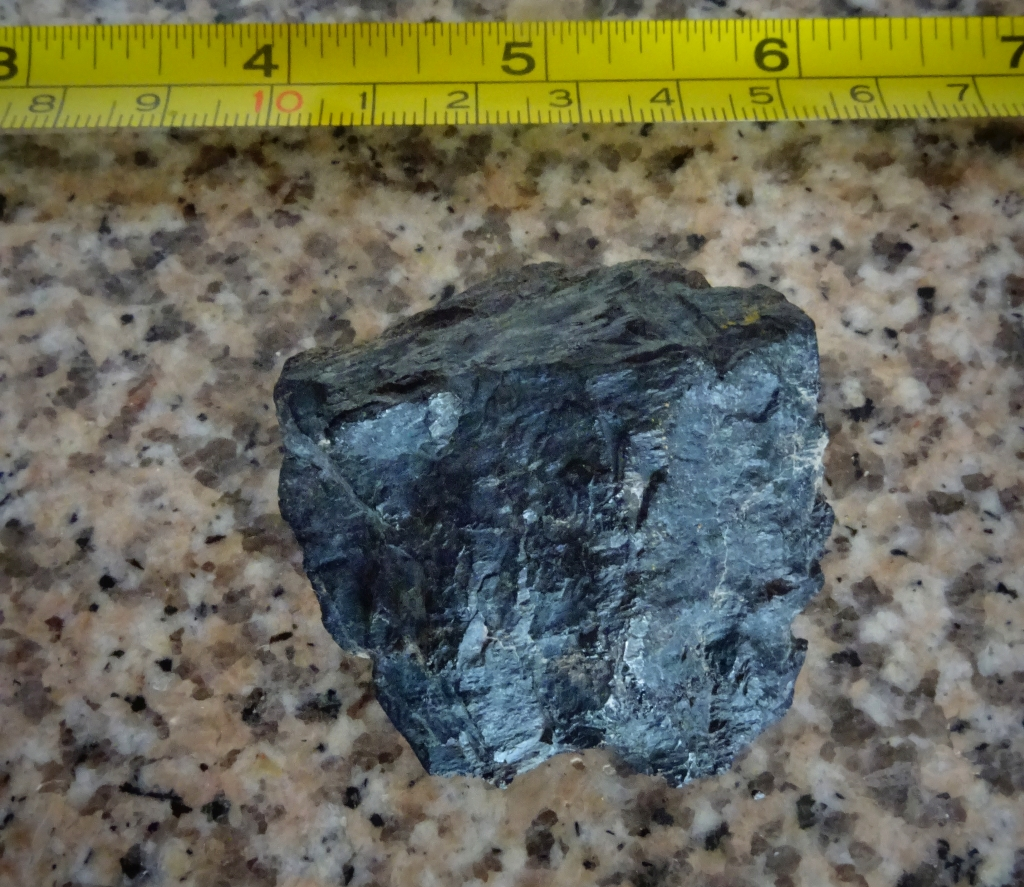
Coal
Guaduas Formation

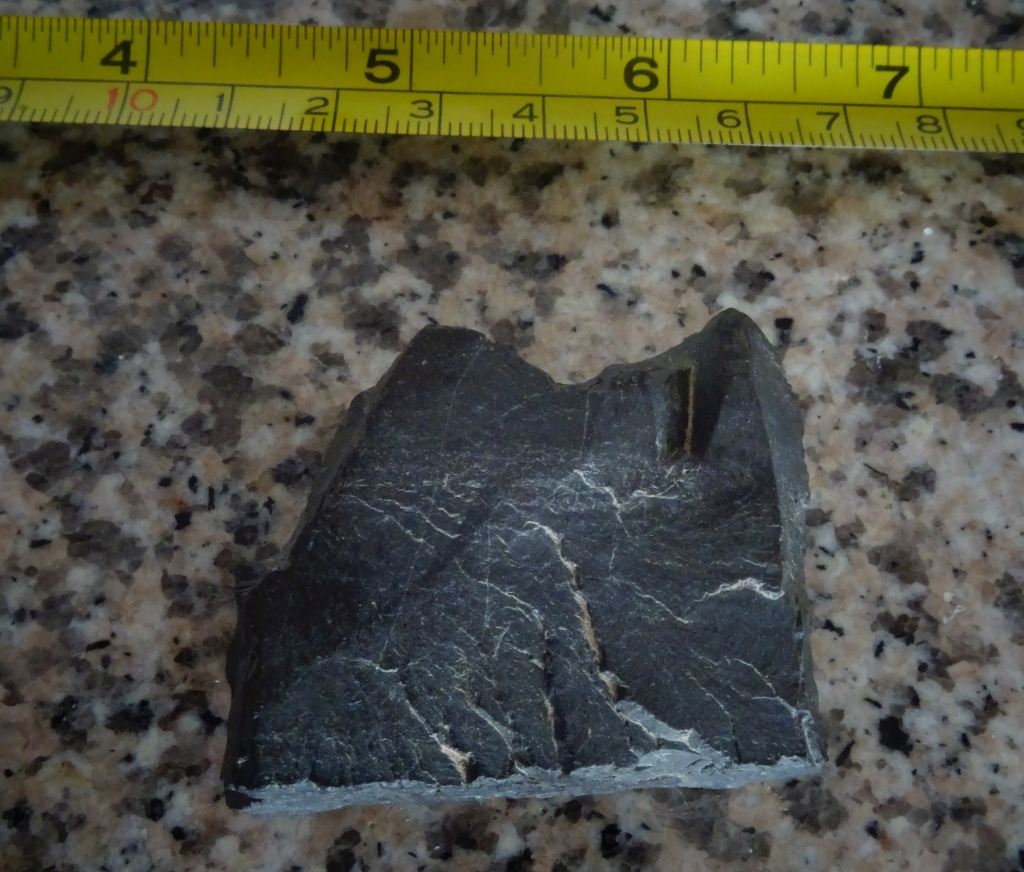
Dark organic shale
Chipaque Formation

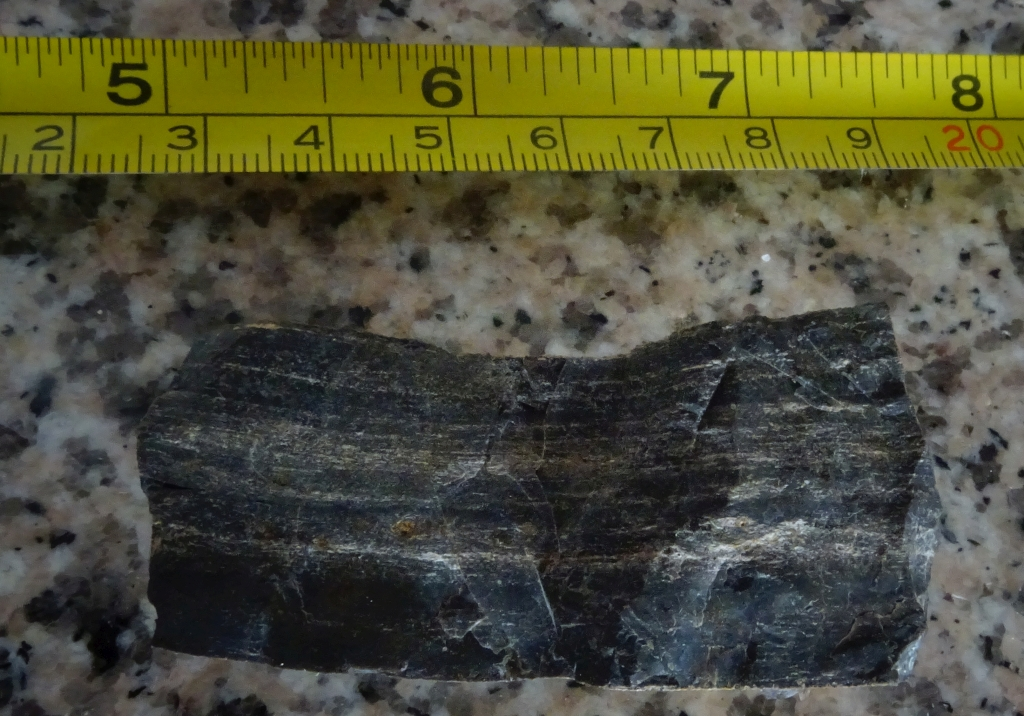
Banded shales
Chipaque Formation

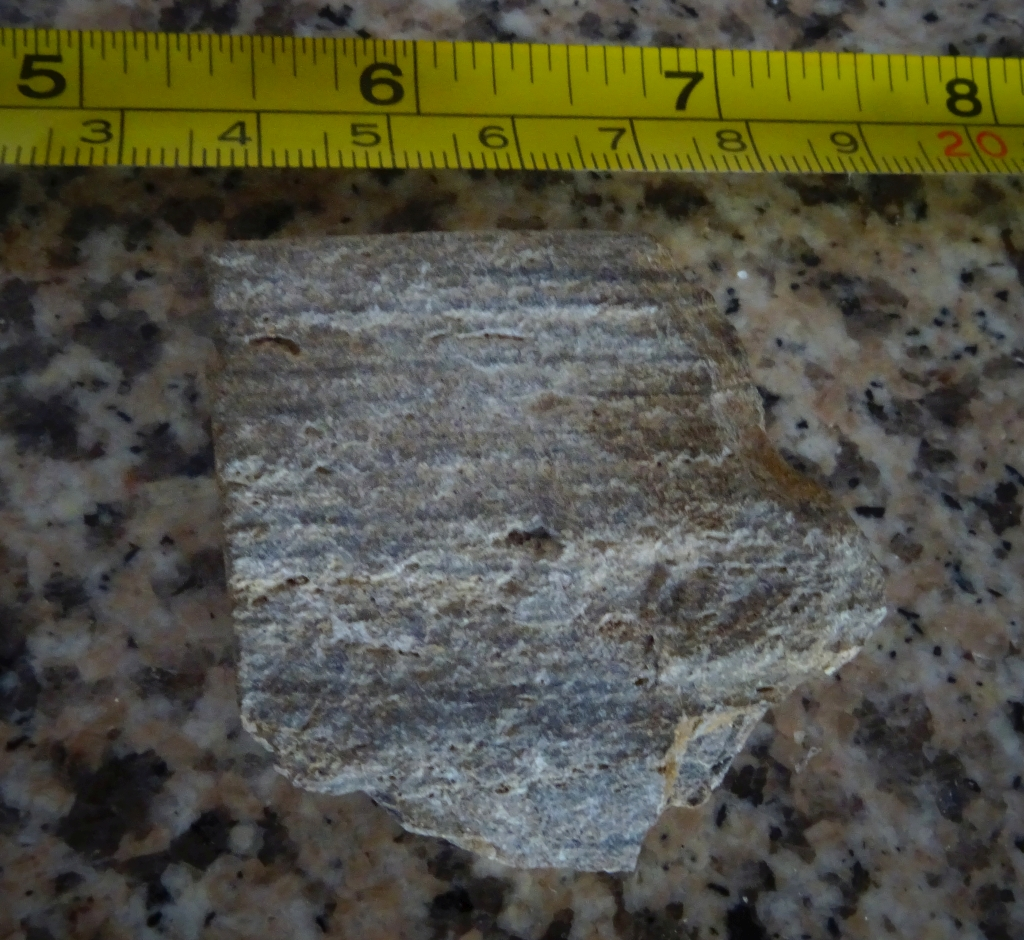
Grey shale
Chipaque Formation

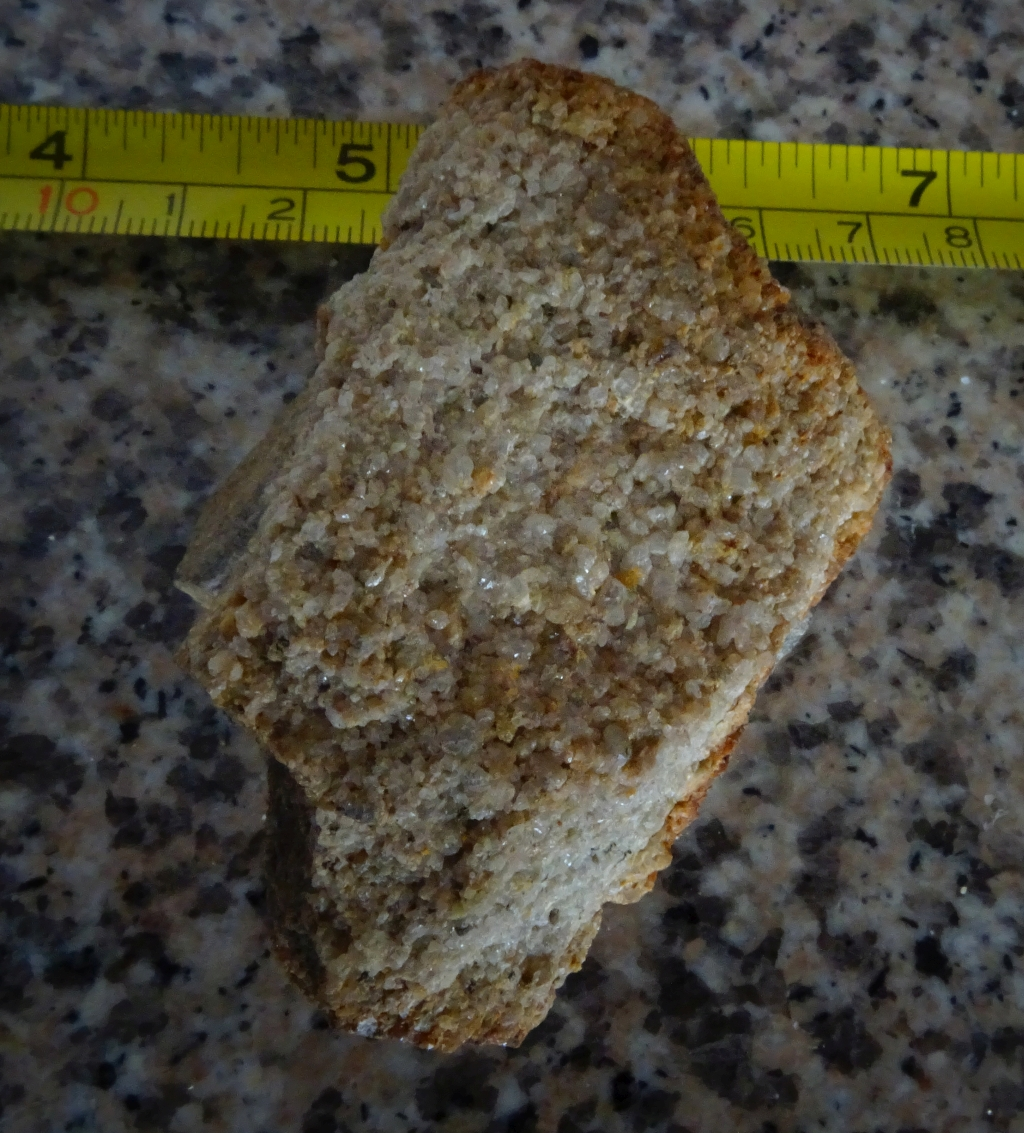
Sandstone
Guadalupe Group

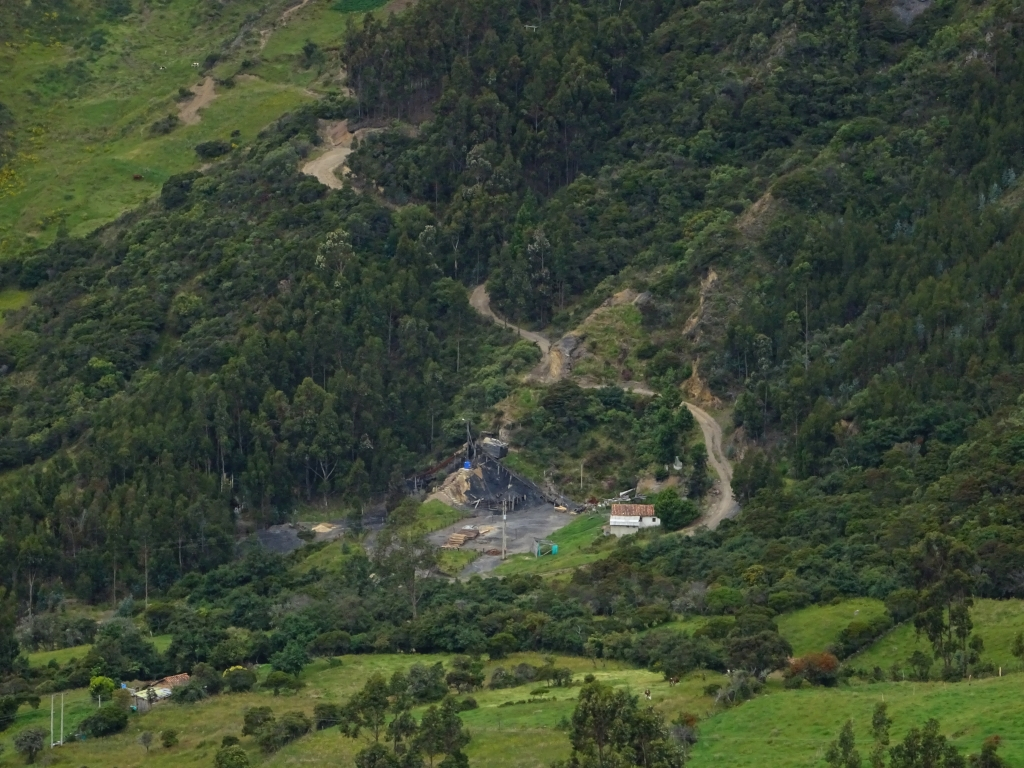
Coal mining close to Monguí

=== Flora ===
The typical flora of a páramo are frailejones, that are plants of the genus Espeletia. The lower altitude parts of the páramo are characterised by Espeletia barclayana, Espeletia jaramilloi, Espeletia congestiflora and Espeletia argentea, while Espeletia grandiflora is growing in a wider altitude distribution. Chusquea tessellata is characteristic of the Eastern Ranges. On the Ocetá Páramo, formerly written as Oseta, various species have been described by Thomas van der Hammen; Bryum argenteum, Breutelia polygastrica, Calamagrostis effusa, Ceratodon stenocarpus, Didymodon laevigatus, Leptodontium flexifolium and Sphagnum sancto-josephense. Other flora occurring on the páramo are Pentacalia vernicosa, Ageratina tinifolia, Bidens andicola, Lupinus luisanae var. ocetensis, Viola sp., Arnica sp. and various types of mosses and lychen.

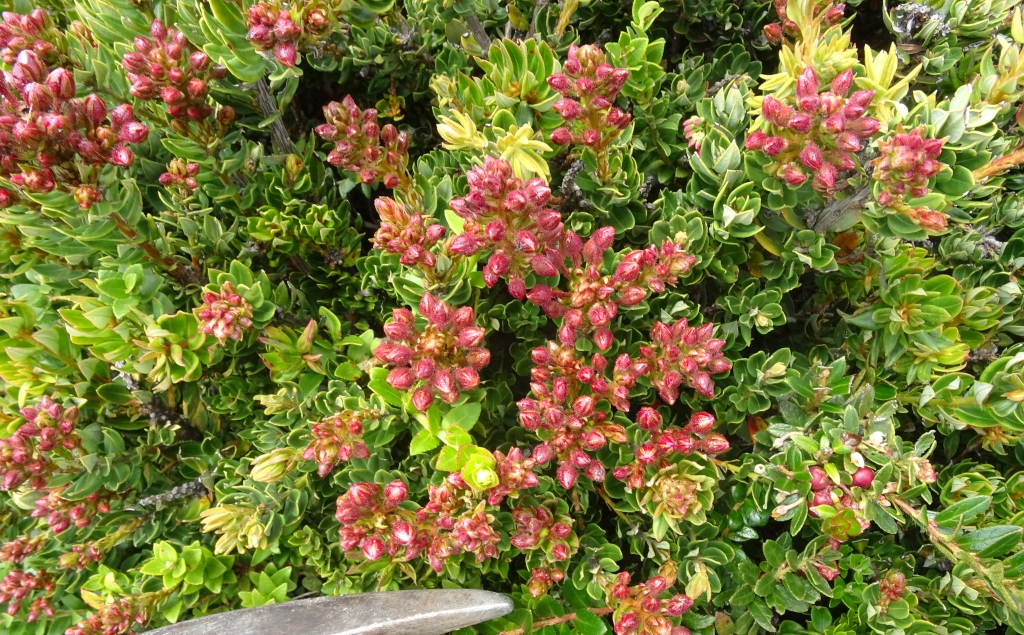
Pentacalia vernicosa

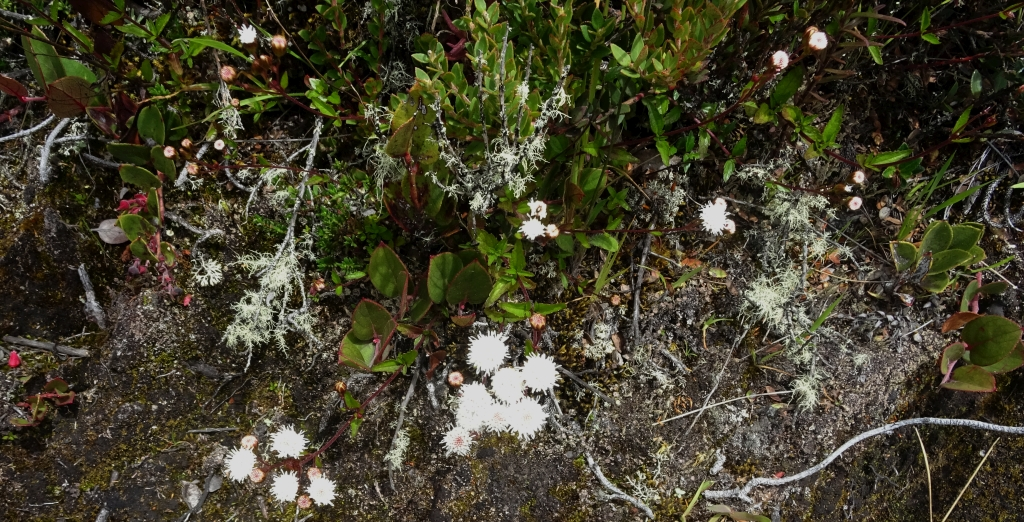
Ageratina tinifolia

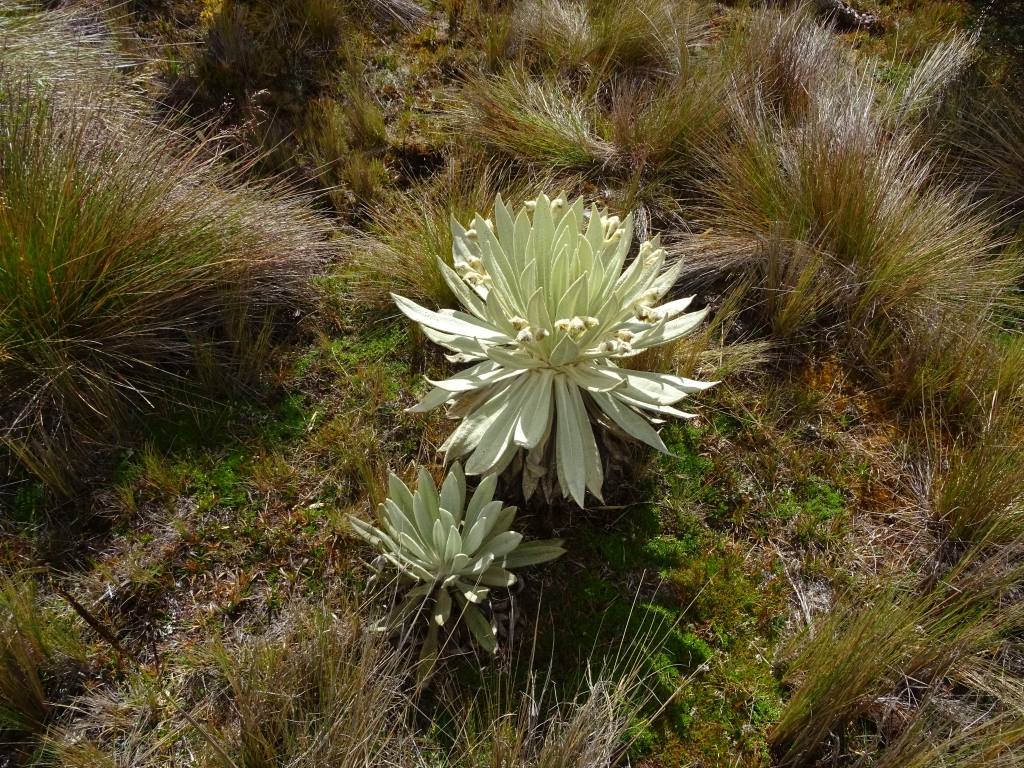
Calamagrostis effusa and Espeletia

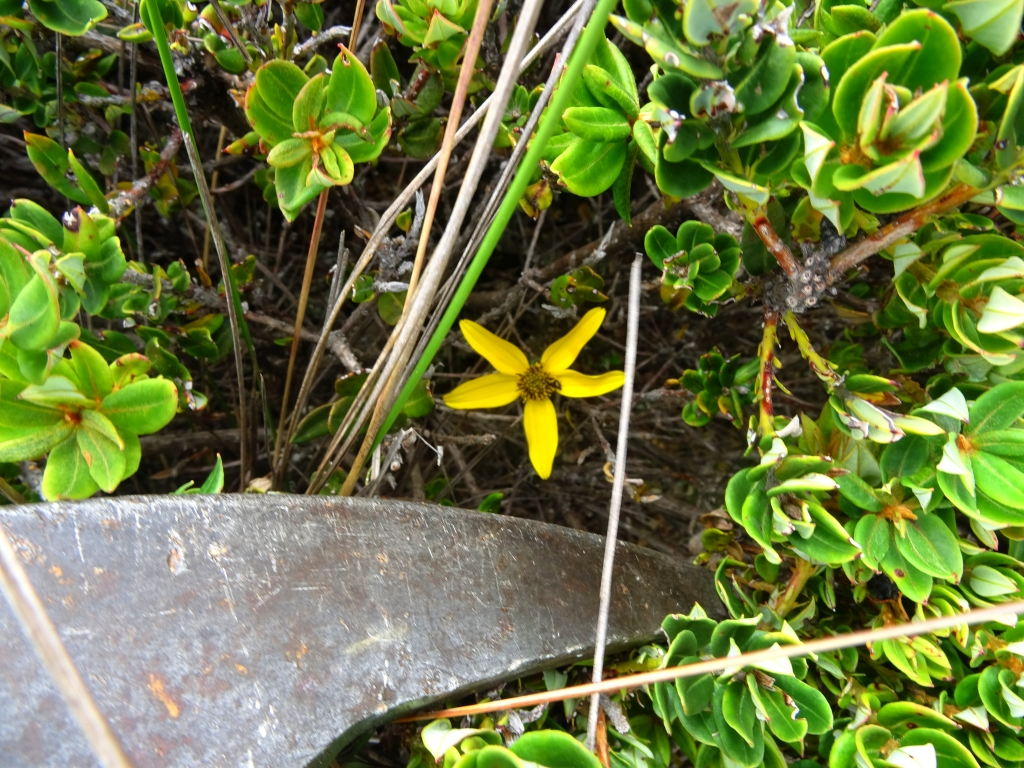
Bidens andicola

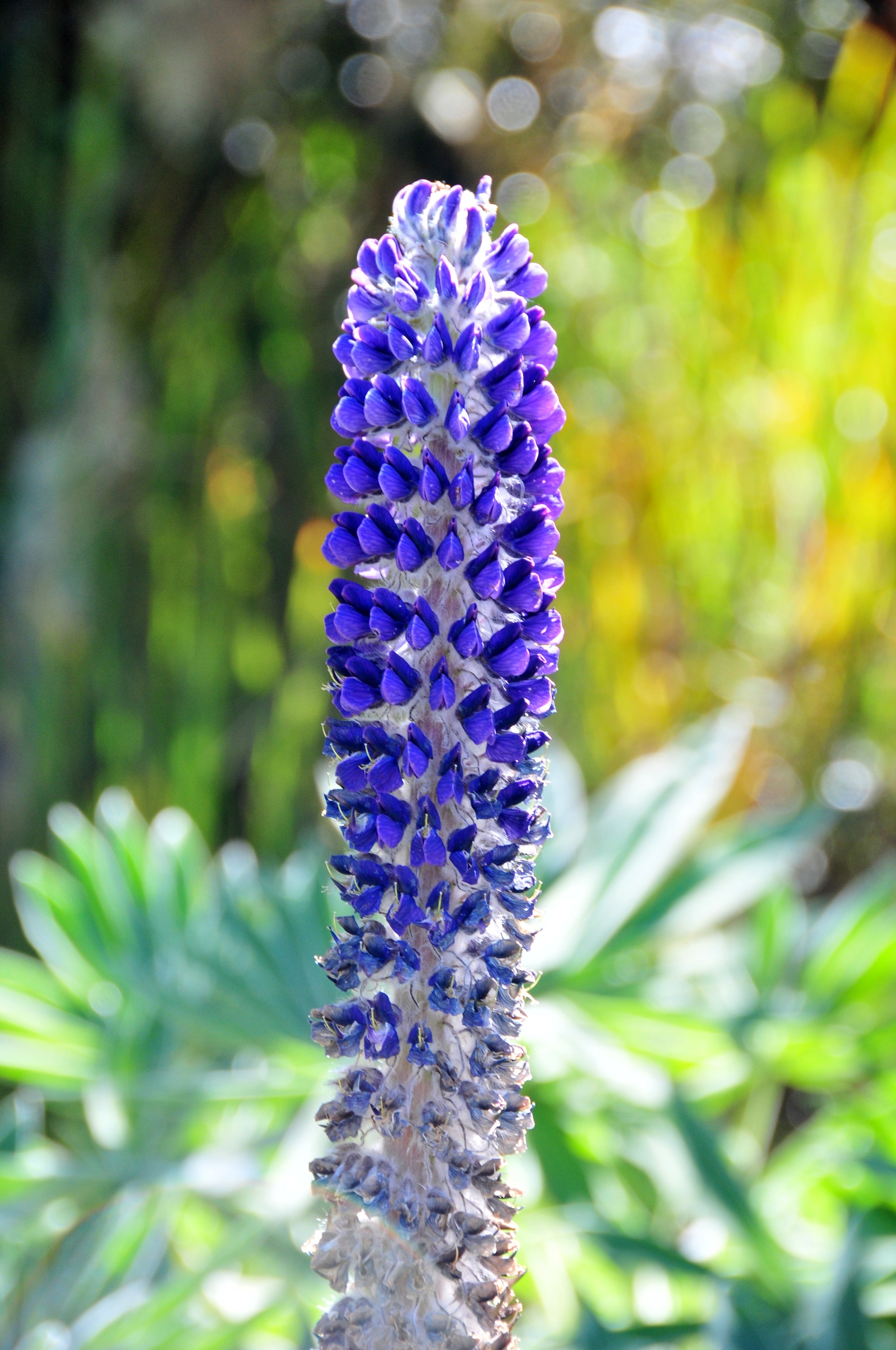
L. luisanae

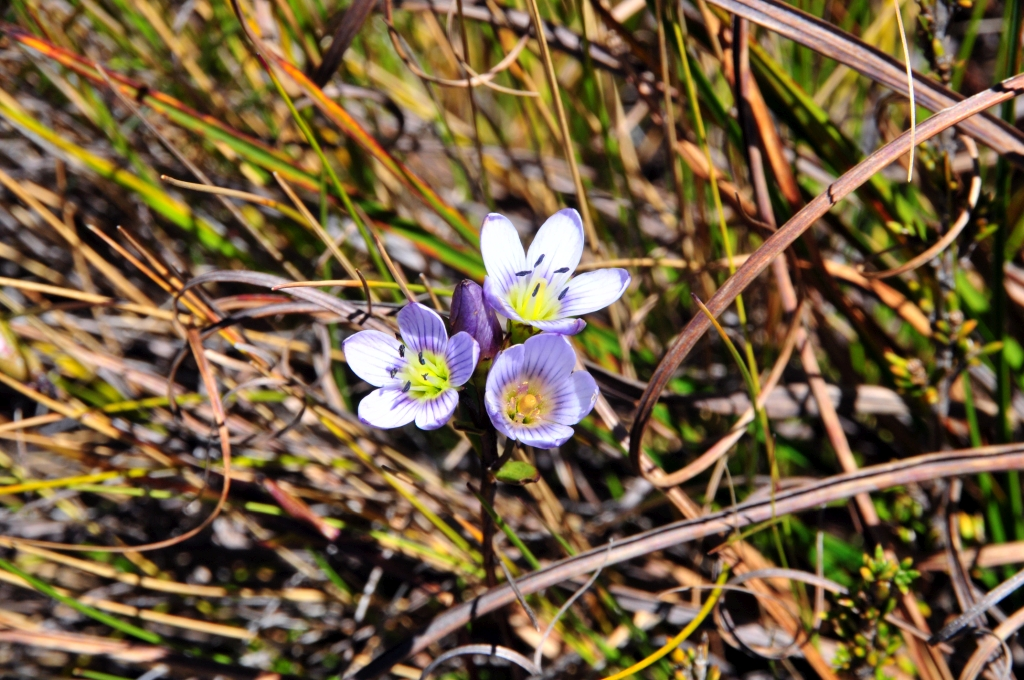
Viola sp.

=== Fauna ===
Among the fauna that can be observed on the páramo are Andean condor, black agouti, eastern cottontail, frogs, mountain paca, spectacled bear, white-tailed deer. The spectacled bear is very rare and possibly extinct. The white tailed deer, the main ingredient of the diet of the Muisca and pre-Muisca, has been extensively hunted and captured over time.

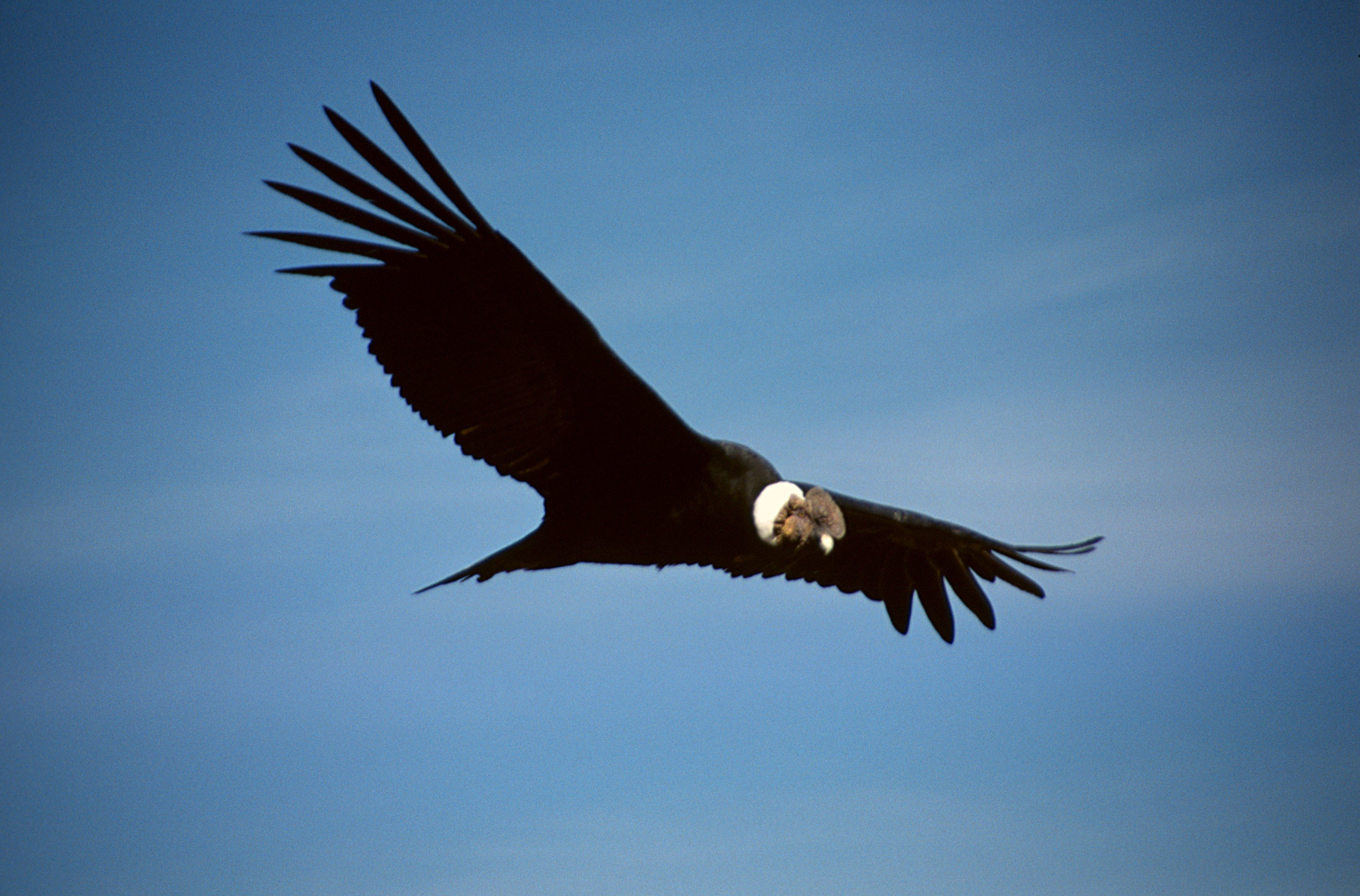
Andean condor

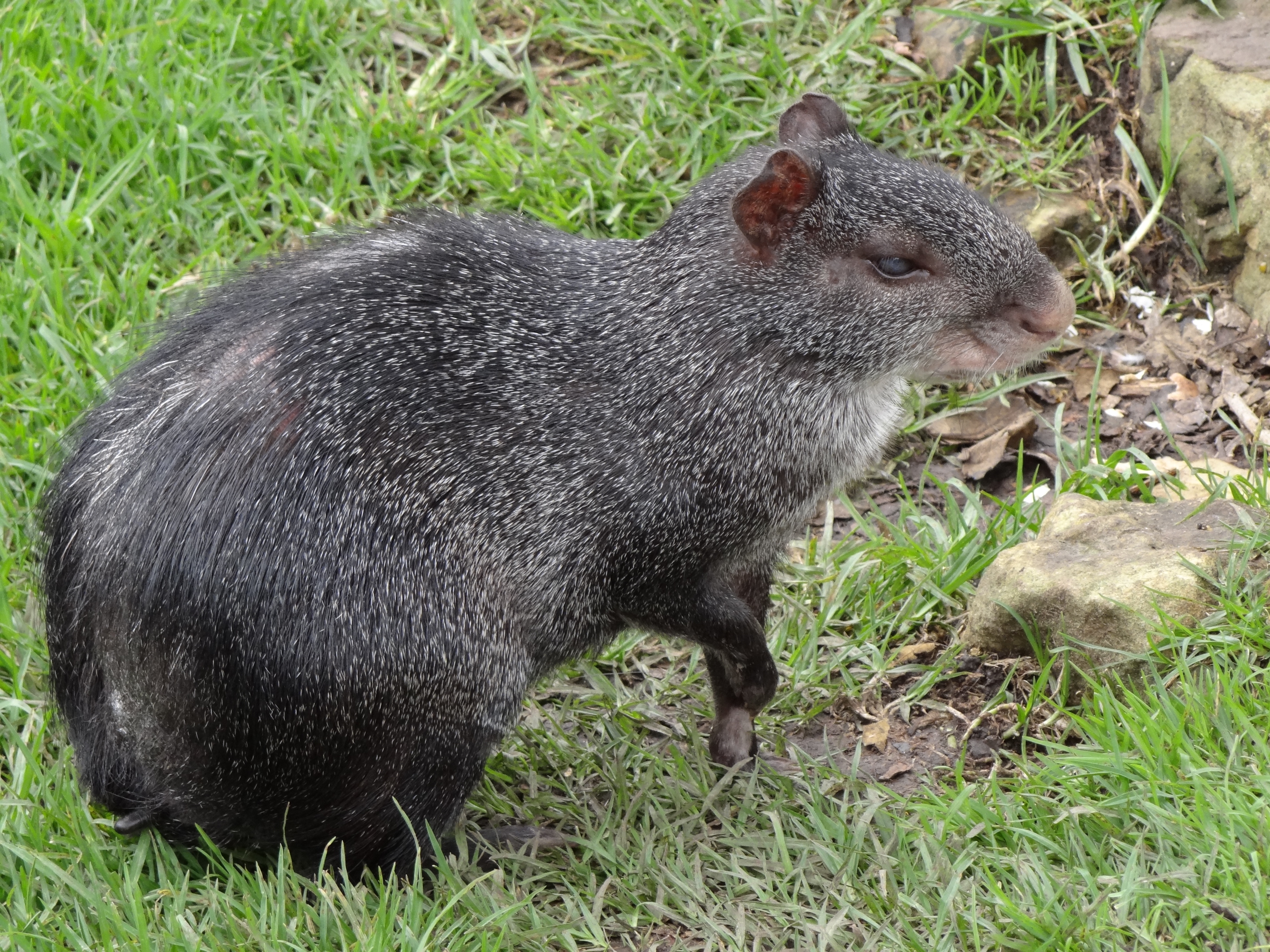
Black agouti

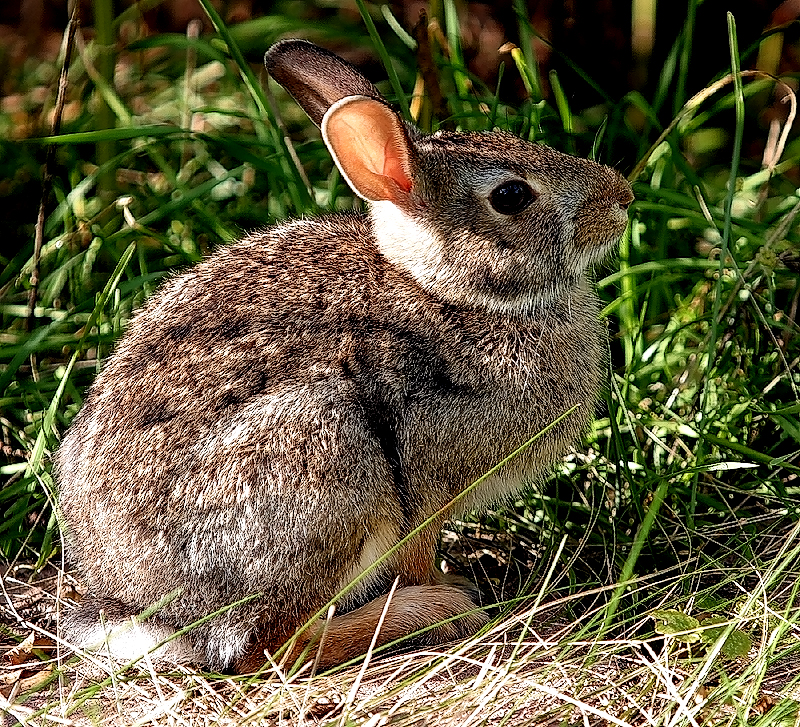
Eastern cottontail

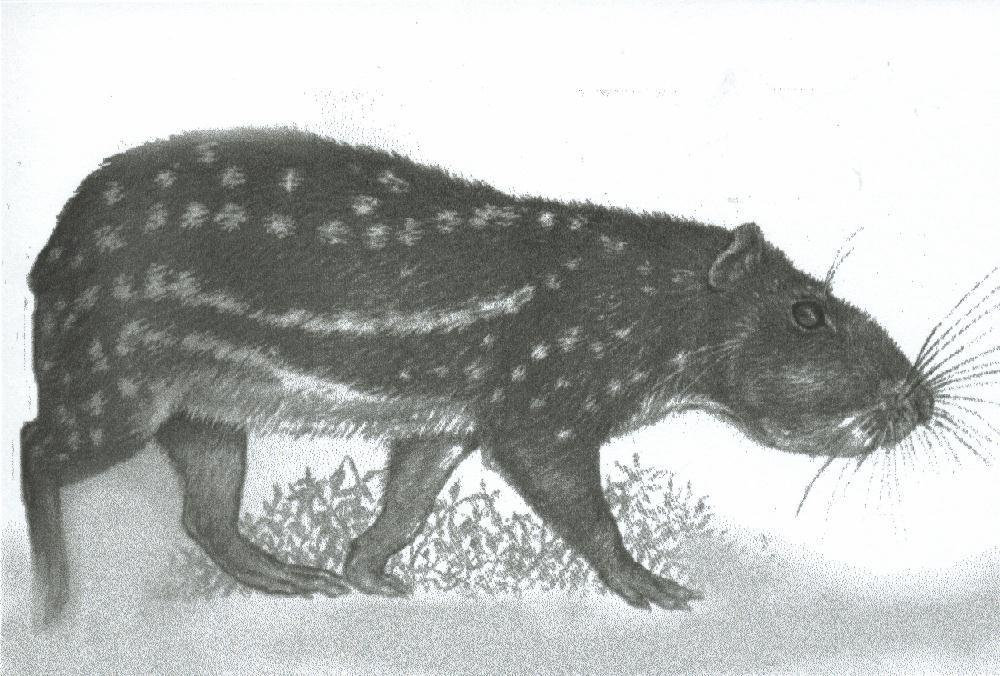
Mountain paca

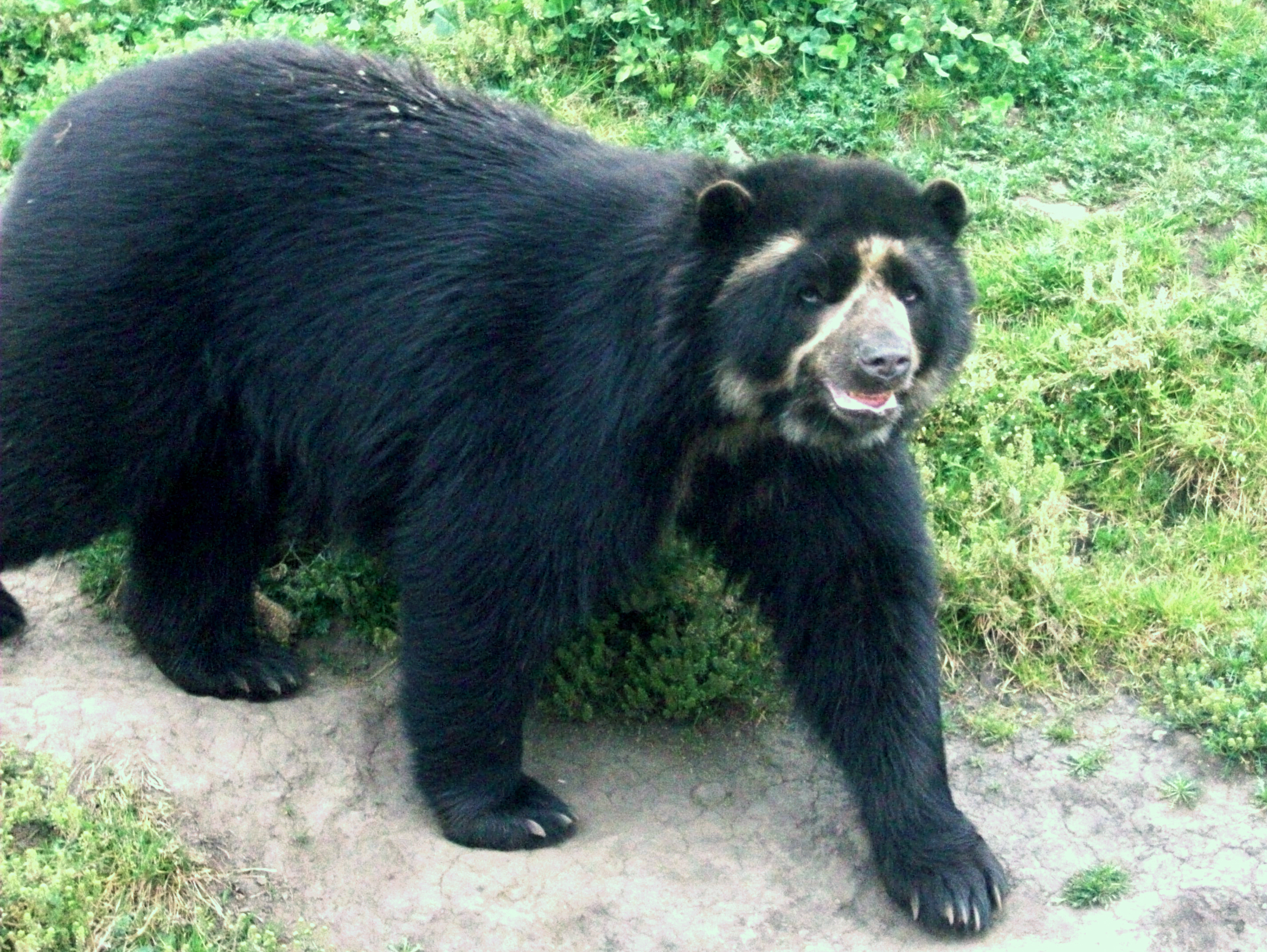
Spectacled bear

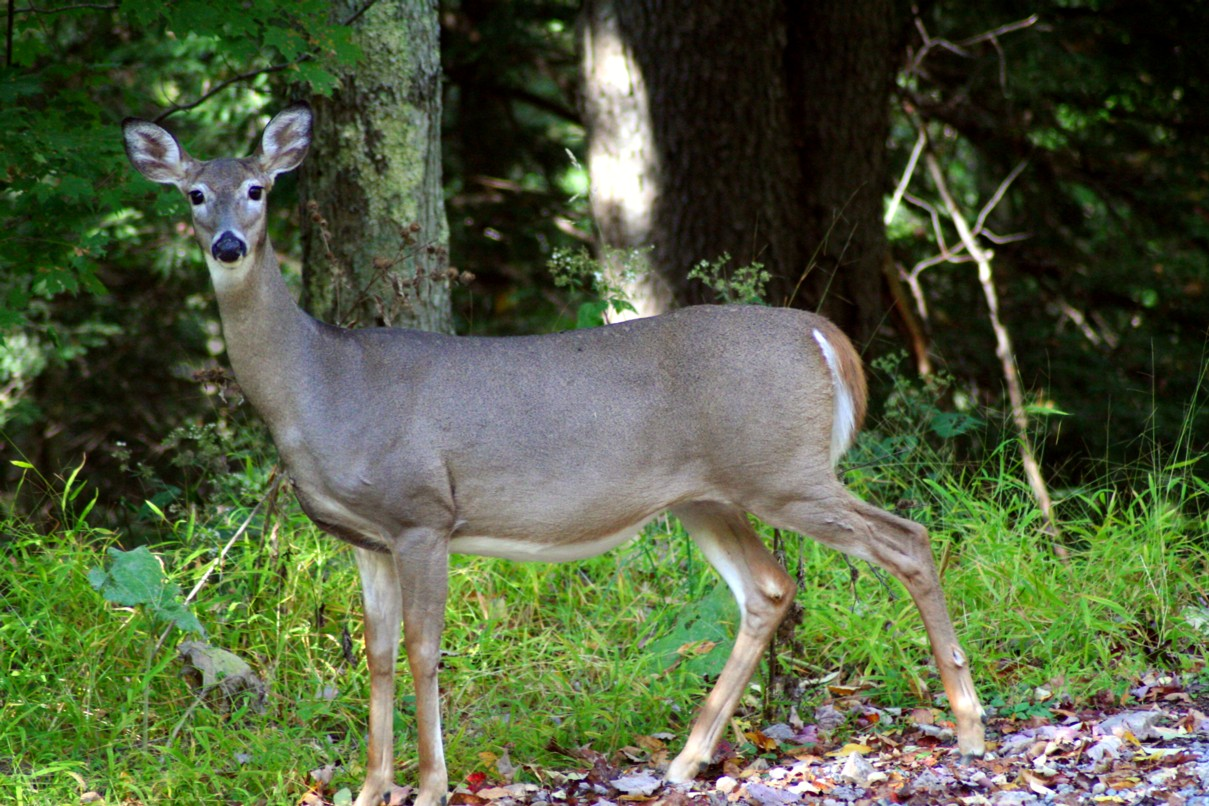
White-tailed deer

=== History ===
The Páramo de Ocetá was a sacred place for the Muisca, who inhabited the Altiplano Cundiboyacense and surrounding areas before the Spanish conquest. The region of Monguí was populated by the Sanoa tribe.

=== Sights ===
Along the route from Monguí to the highest point of the Ocetá Páramo, a series of sights are present. From most of the route, to the (south)west, a view of the Duitama-Sogamoso Valley, especially the settlements of Tibasosa, Nobsa and Duitama, is visible. From the Mirador de Cóndores and the Cerro de Águilas on clear days it is possible to see the snowy peaks of the Sierra Nevada del Cocuy and even the Llanos Orientales.

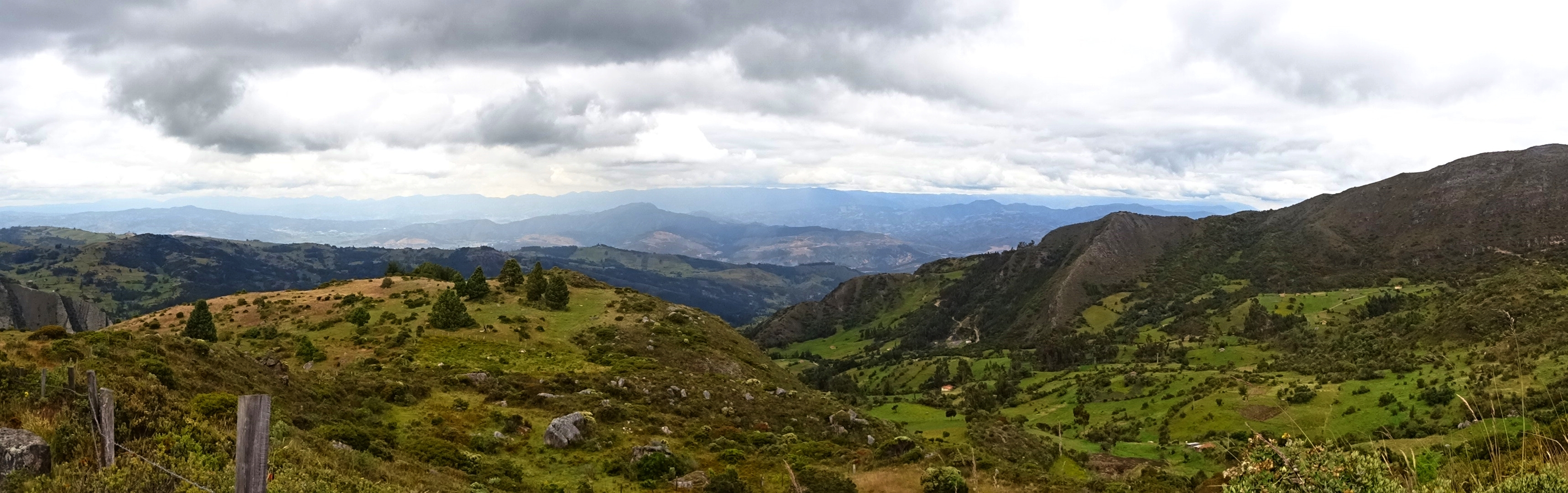
Panorama of Tibasosa (left), Nobsa (centre) and Duitama (background)

==== Tortolitas ====
The Tortolitas (English: "Sweethearts") are oval-shaped depressions that were made by the Muisca. They served as "baths" where the Muisca women bore their babies. Close to the Tortolitas, Muisca petroglyphs have been found.

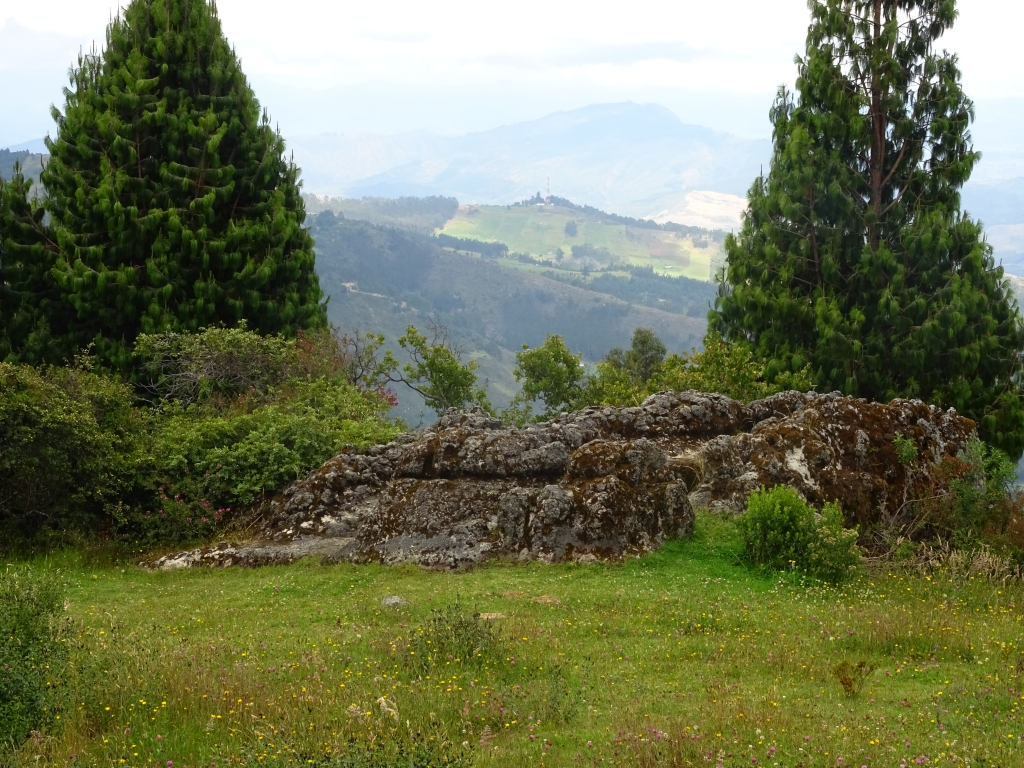
Rock formation where the Tortolitas are made

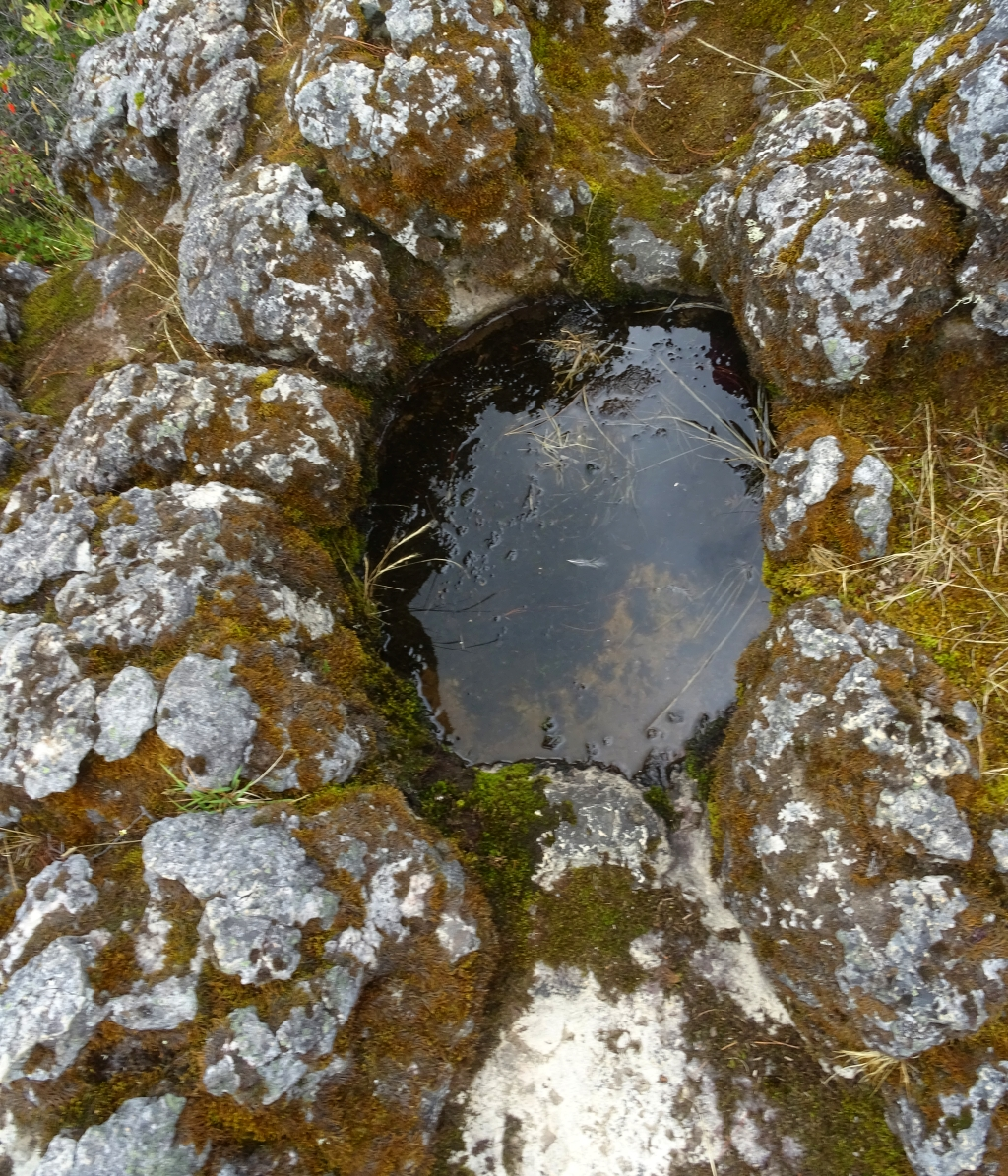
Tortolita

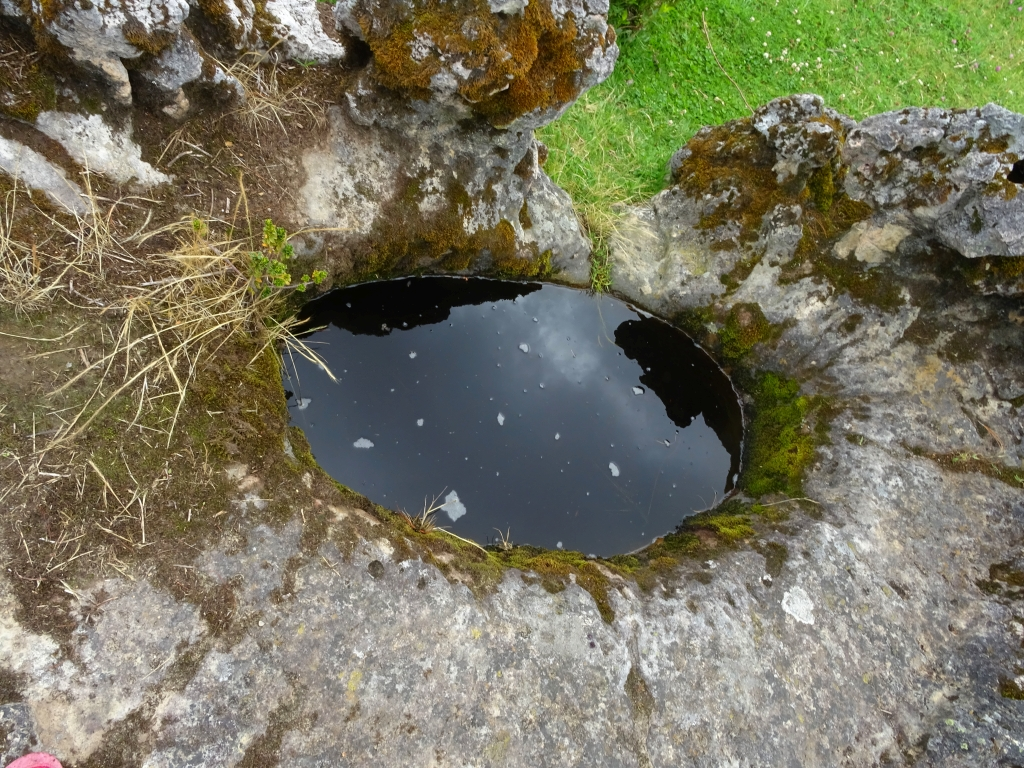
Tortolita

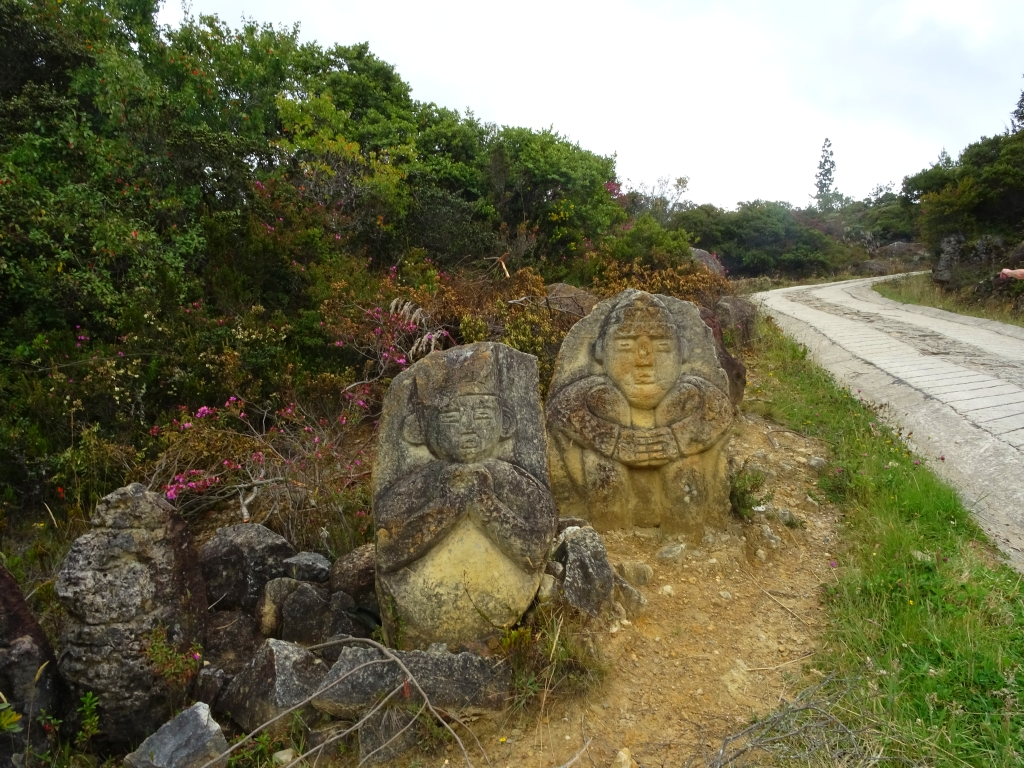
Muisca petroglyphs

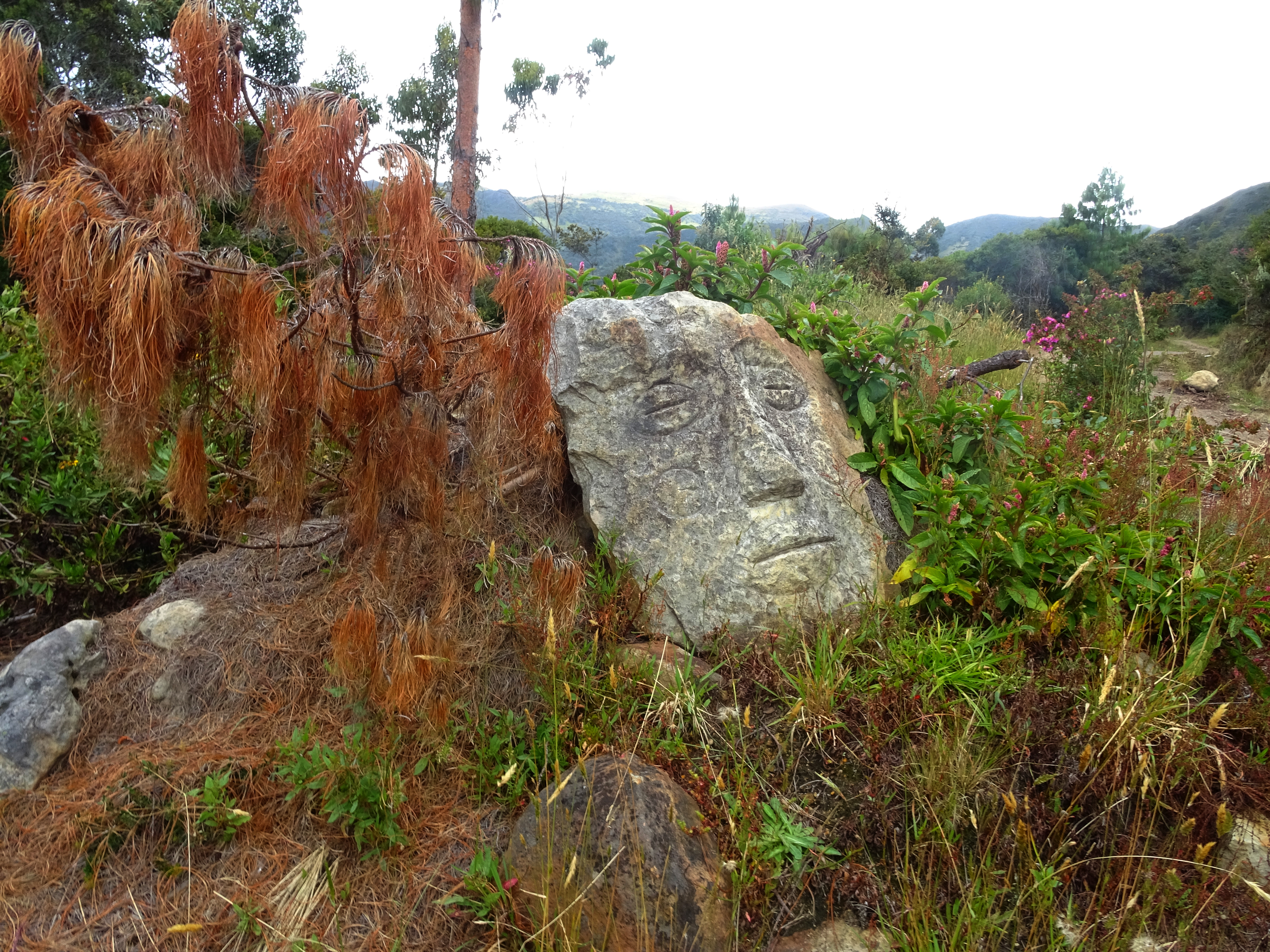
Muisca petroglyph

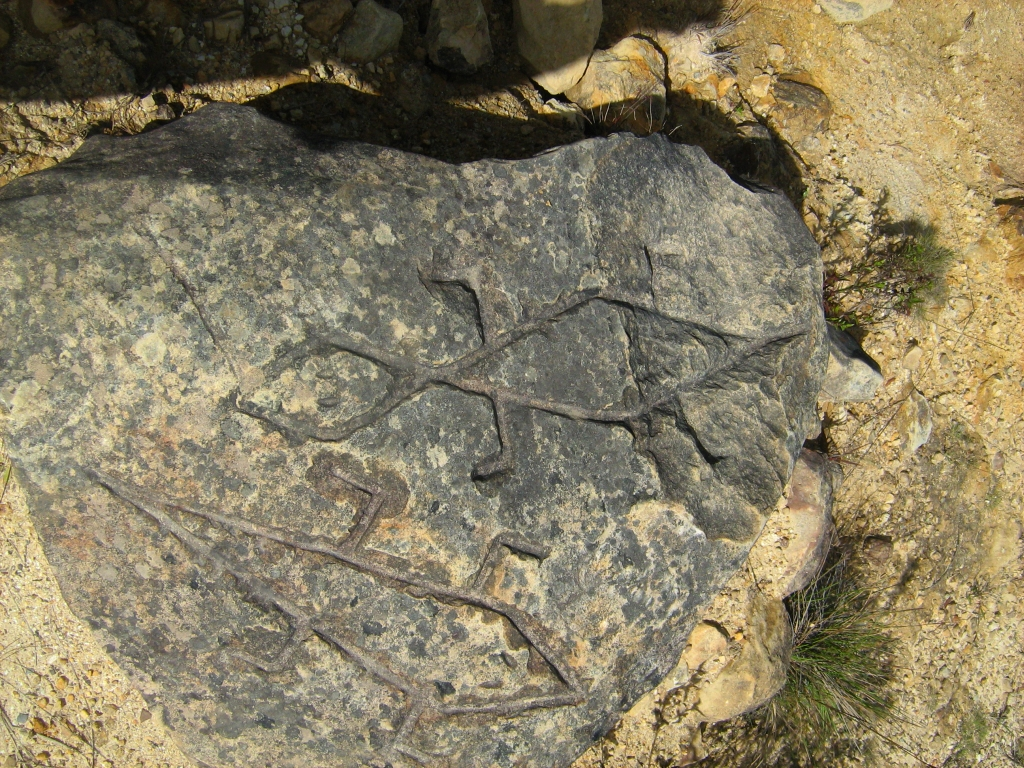
Muisca petroglyphs

==== Peña de Otí ====
The Peña de Otí (English: "Rock of Otí") is an outcrop of alternating shales and sandstones of the Socha Formation. It is observed to the southwest from the main trail leading to the Mirador de los Cóndores on the páramo. The rocks of the Peña de Otí were used to construct the churches and convent in Monguí. Legends about the Peña include tales of witches dancing with the devil on October 31, the origin of the scratches on the rock face from the devil who was riding a donkey on the hilltop and fell down, when the hoofs created the scratches and that the hill opened one day revealing the Calicanto Bridge and church made of gold. The end of the world would come when the hill closed again.

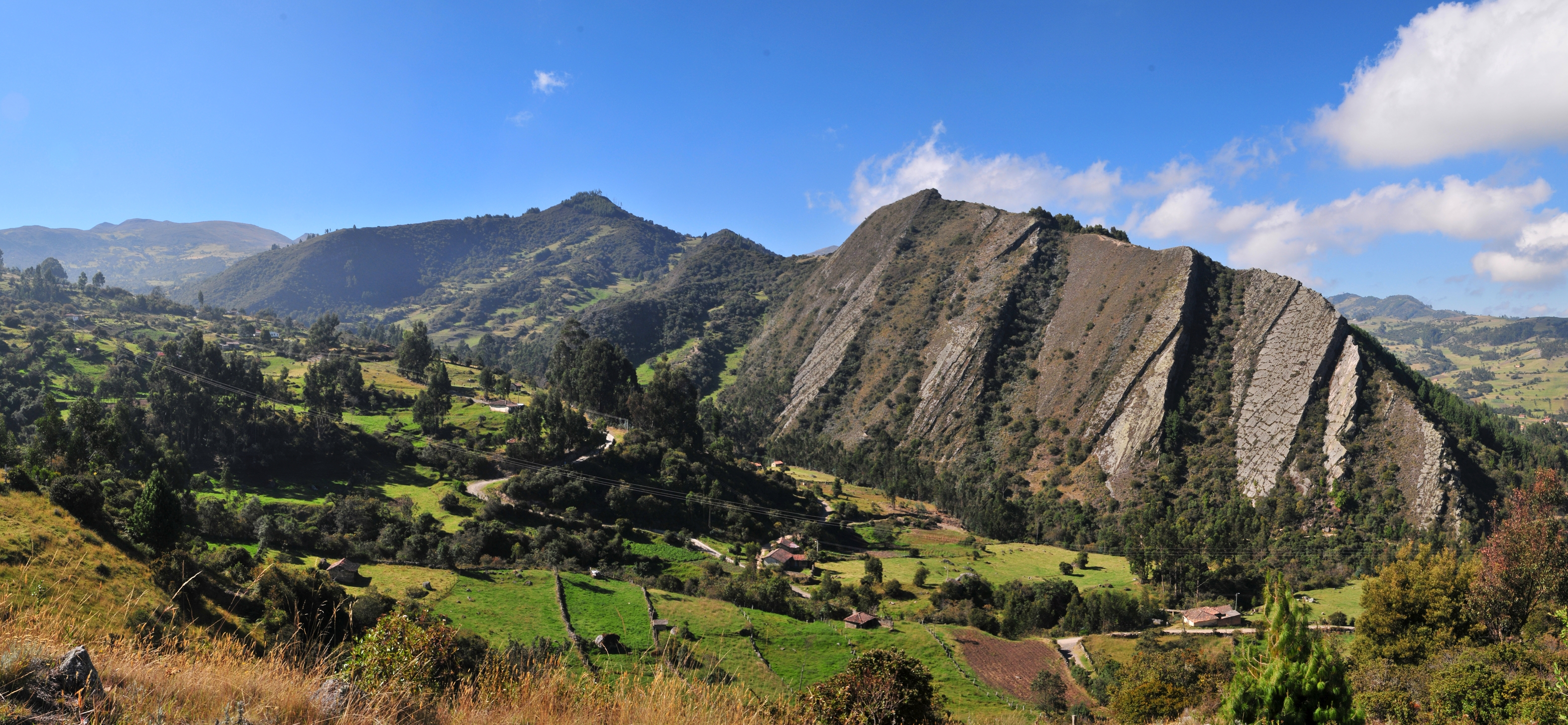
Panorama of the Peña de Otí

==== Caja del Rey ====
The Caja del Rey (English: "The King's Box") is a monolith of about 8 metres (26 ft) high, 8 metres (26 ft) wide and 15 metres (49 ft) long. Legend says it is a box of rock with a lid on top where the cacique Sanoha hid a fifteen-year-old girl inside, who during a night in April exited naked. The monolith contains an upper part where a natural fractured zone has been excavated more by humans. The rock is also a viewpoint for the western area.

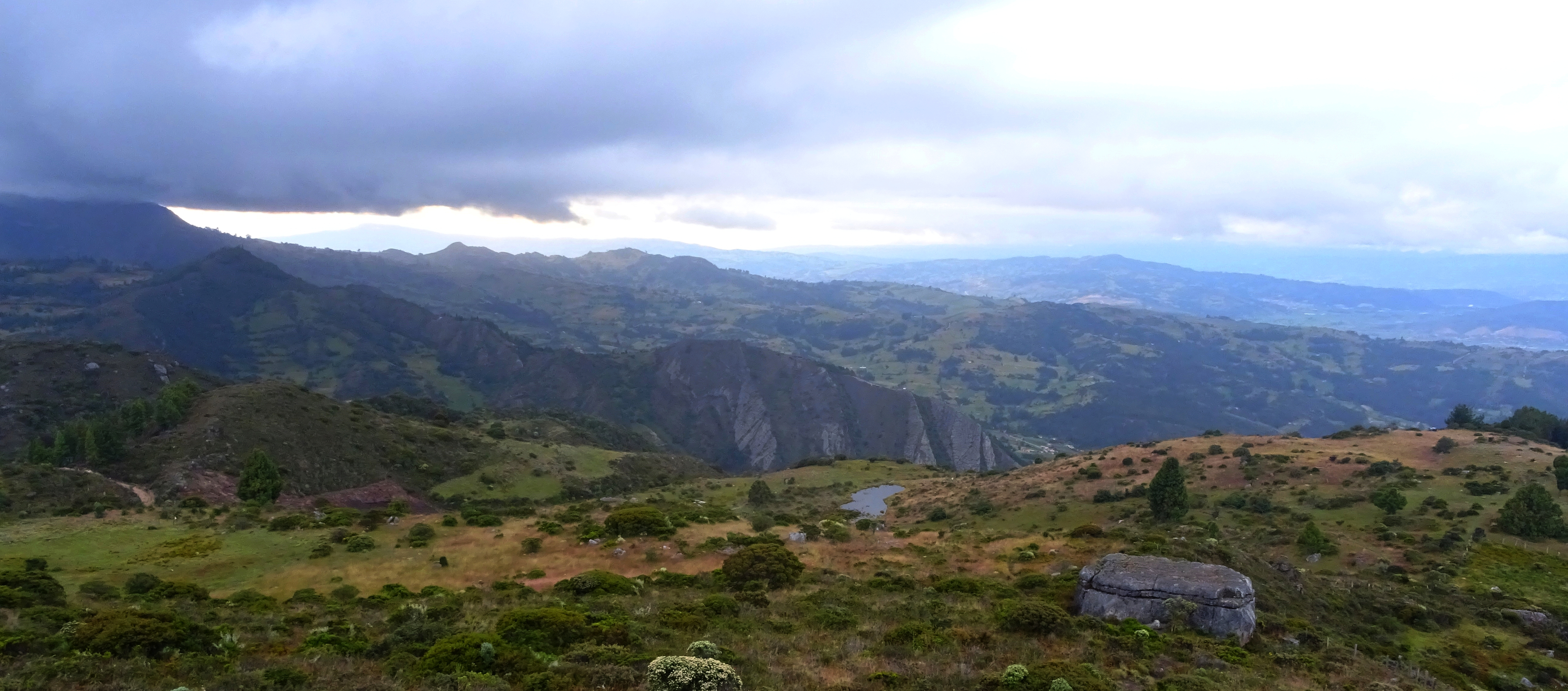
Panorama of the Caja del Rey and the Peña de Otí

==== Ciudad de Piedra ====
Ciudad de Piedra or Ciudad Perdida (English: "The Stone or Lost City"), not to be confused with its famous counterpart in the Sierra Nevada de Santa Marta, is a series of rock formations of 15 metres (49 ft) high, 20 metres (66 ft) wide and 200 metres (660 ft) long. In the Ciudad de Piedra, a tabular stone, thought to have served for human sacrifices, called Mesa de los Sacrificios is present.

El Pulpito del Diablo (English: "The Devil's Pulpit") is a raised mesa-type hill to the south of the main hiking trail on the Páramo de Ocetá.

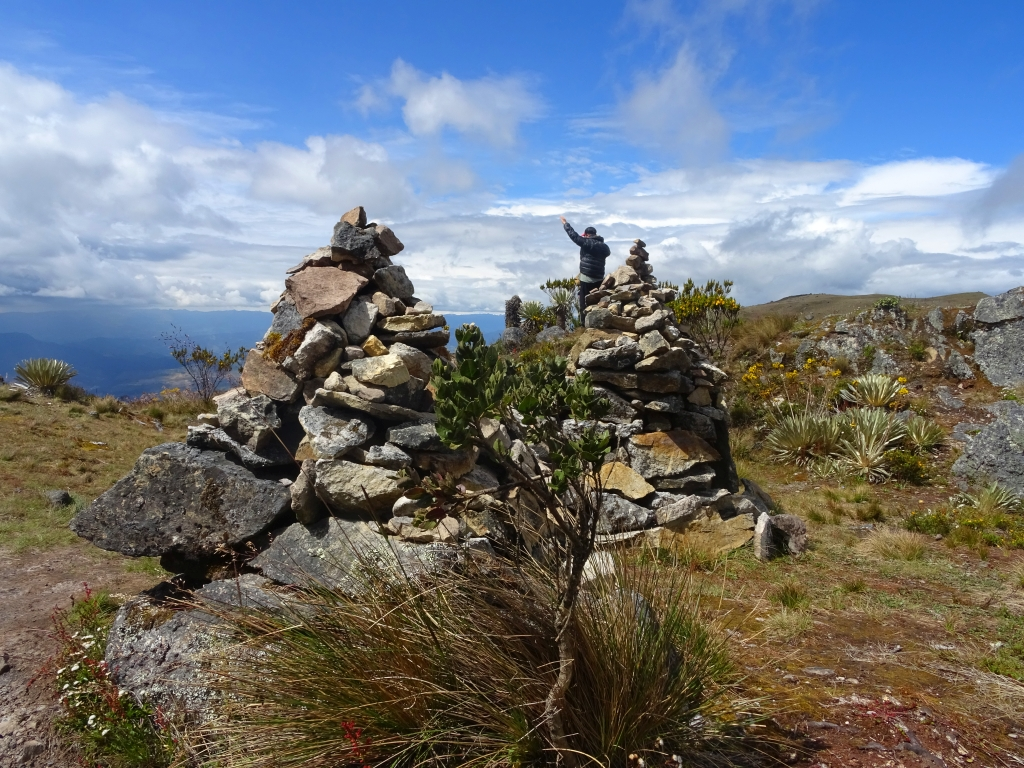
Ciudad de Piedra

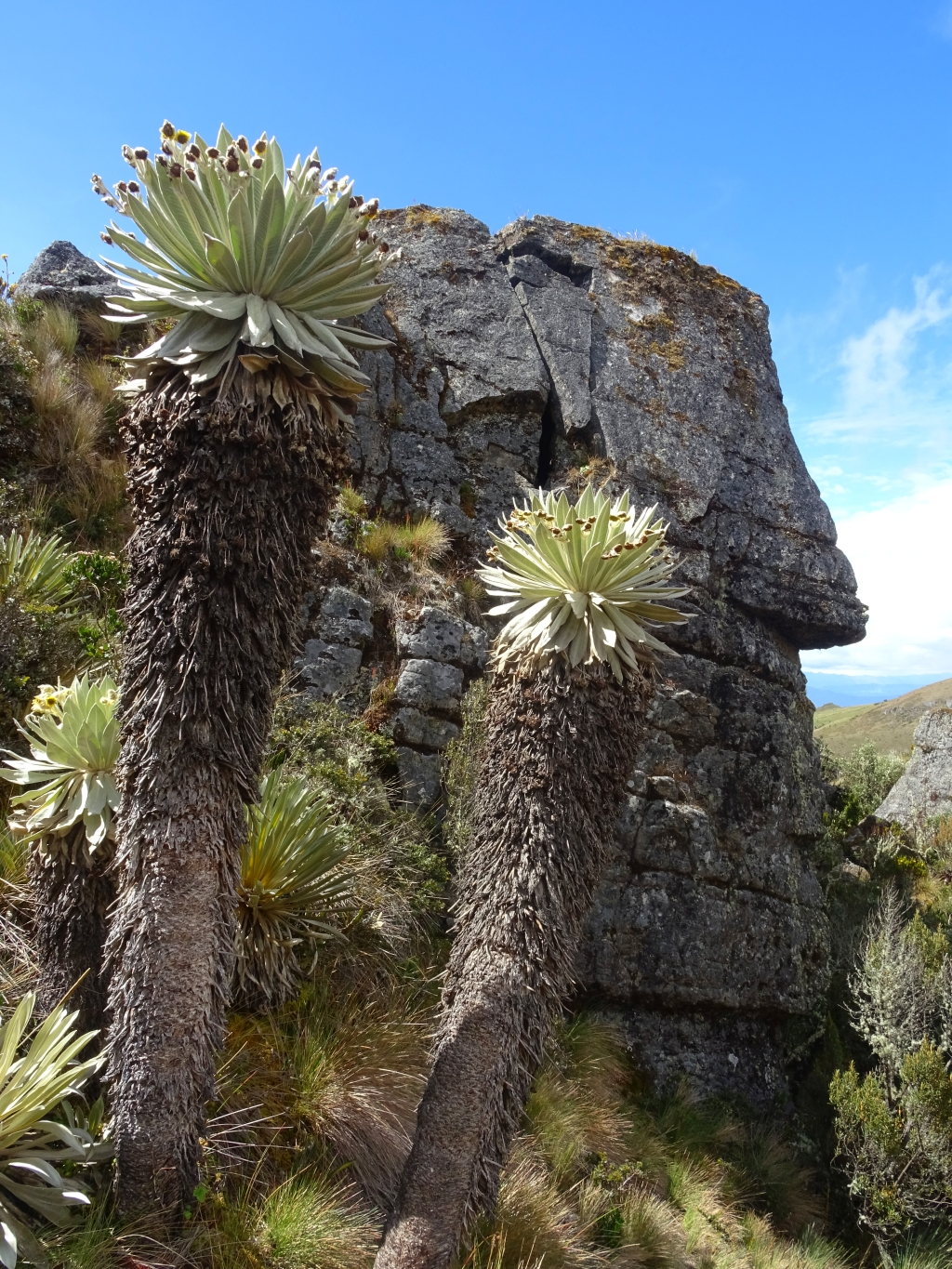
Ciudad de Piedra

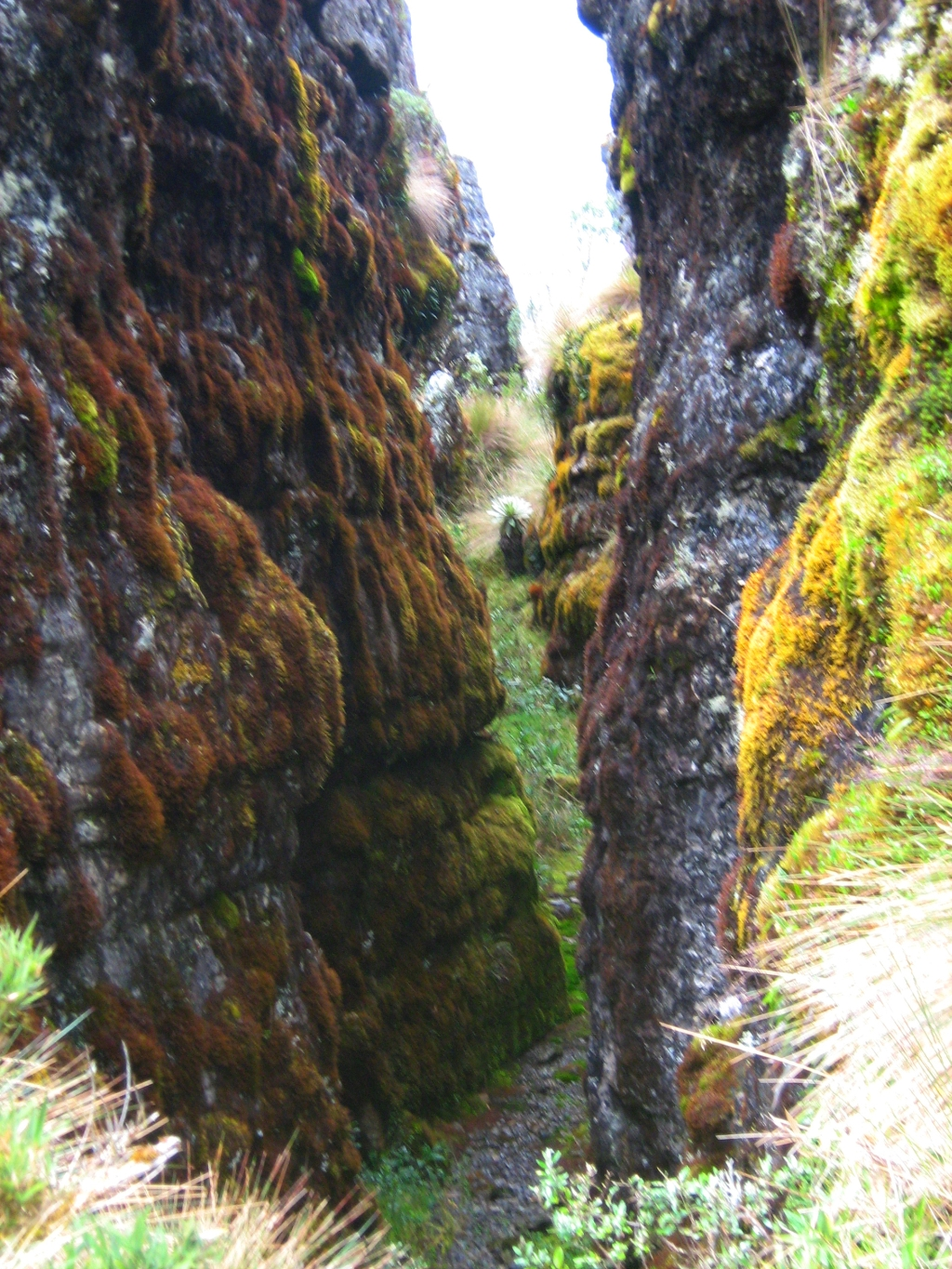
Moss at the Ciudad de Piedra

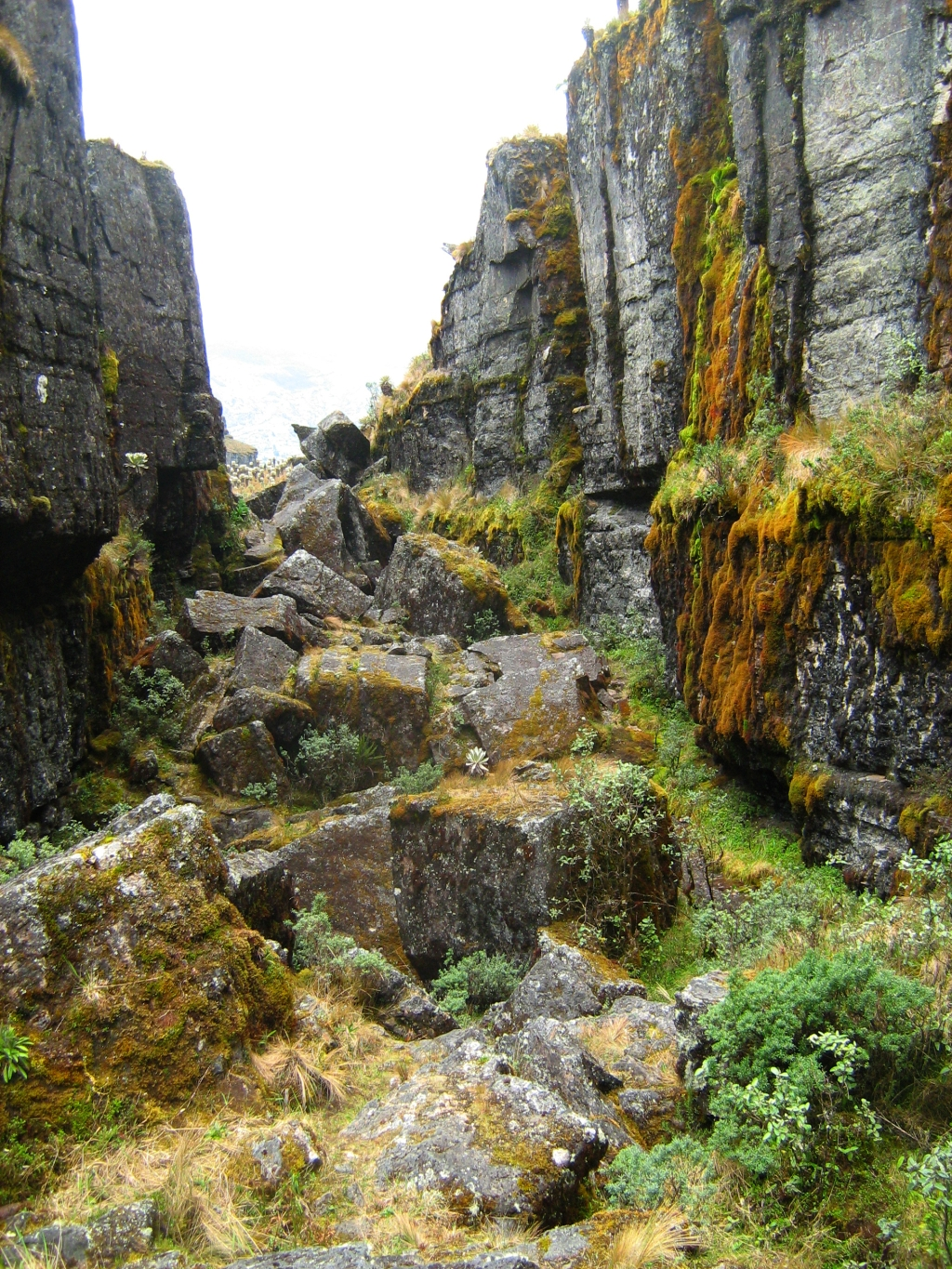
Moss at the Ciudad de Piedra

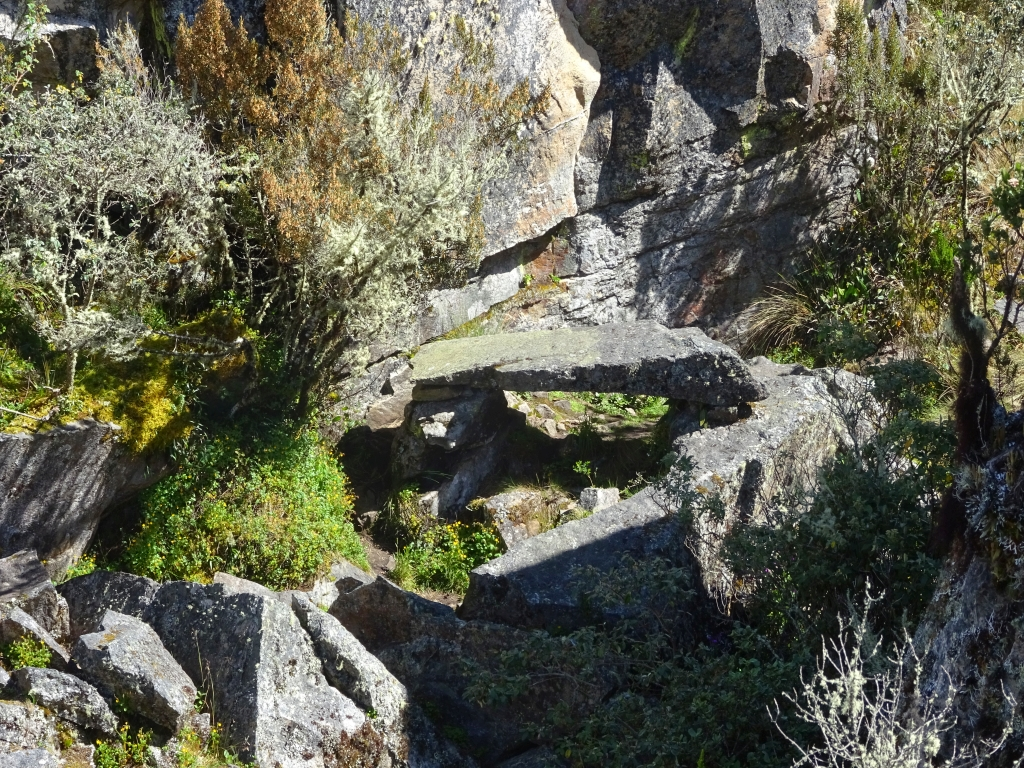
Mesa de los Sacrificios

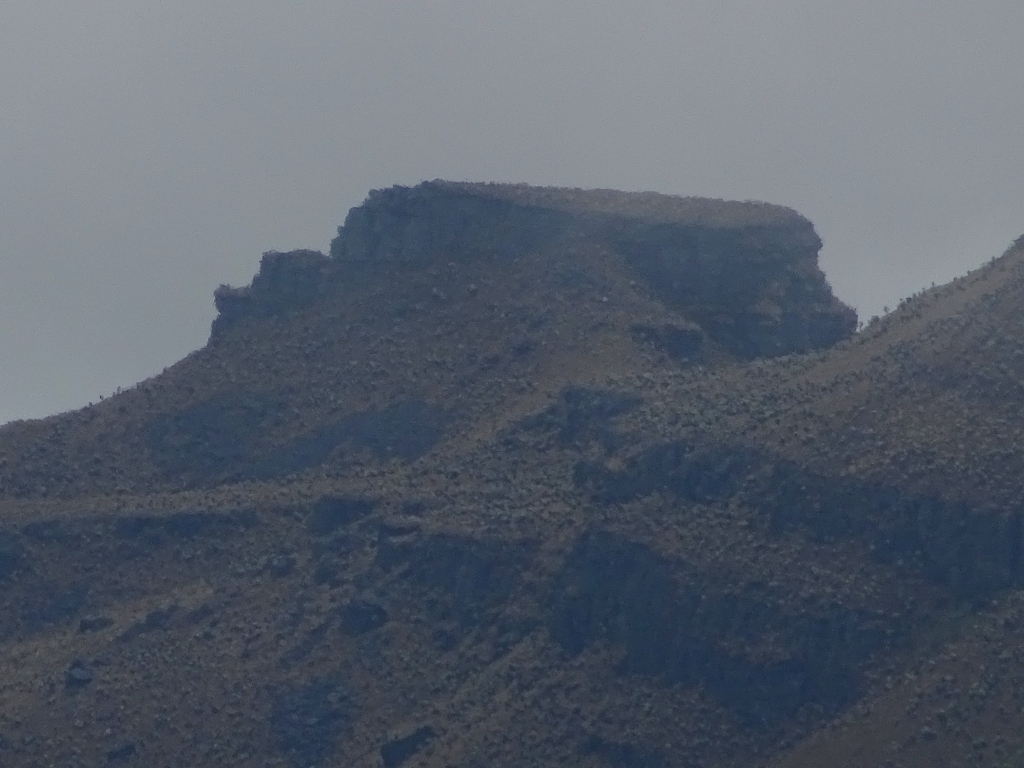
El Pulpito del Diablo

==== Playa de los Frailejones ====
The Playa or Valle de Frailejones or Jardines de Ocetá (English: "Frailejon Beach or Valley" or "Ocetá Gardens") is a relatively flat portion on the páramo where a large quantity of frailejones are growing. The frailejones grow 1 centimetre (0.39 in) a year.

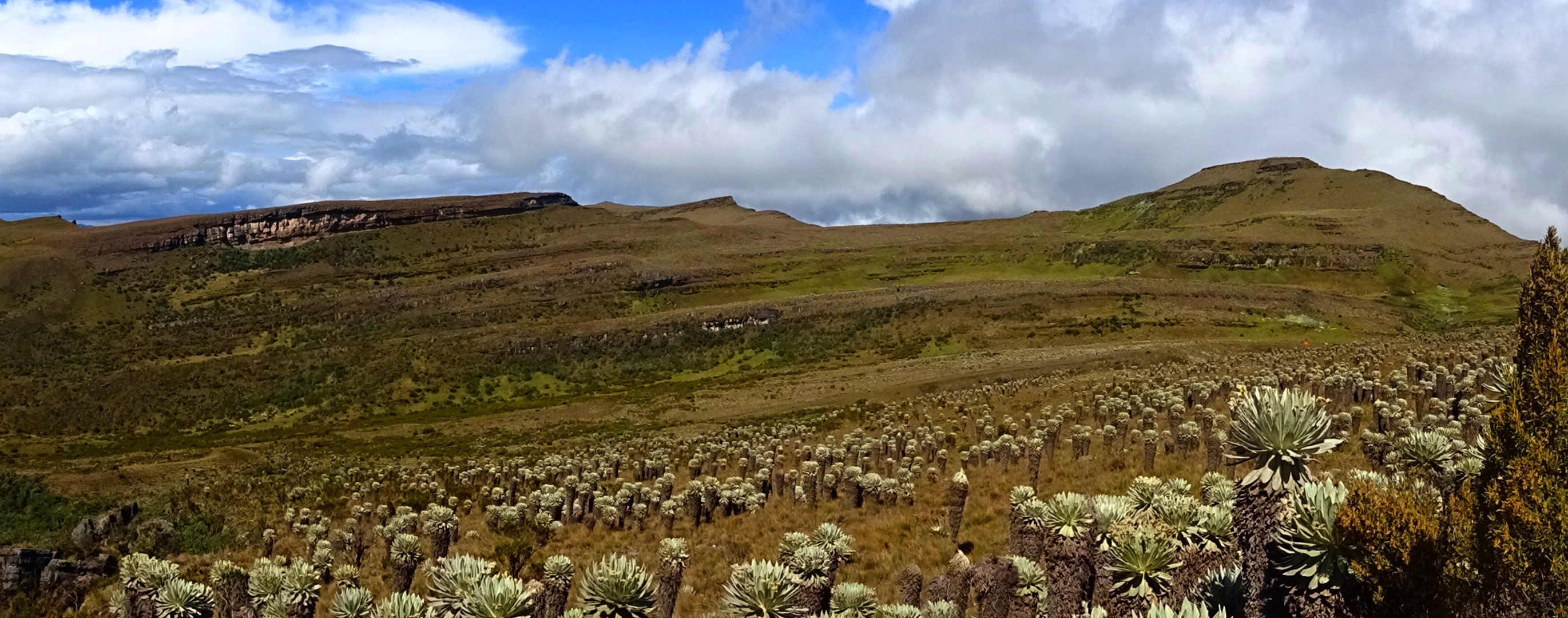
Panorama of the Playa de los Frailejones

==== Cerro de Águilas ====
The Cerro de Águilas (English: "Eagles Hill") is a hill on the páramo consisting of alternating shales and sandstone formations of the Guadalupe Group.

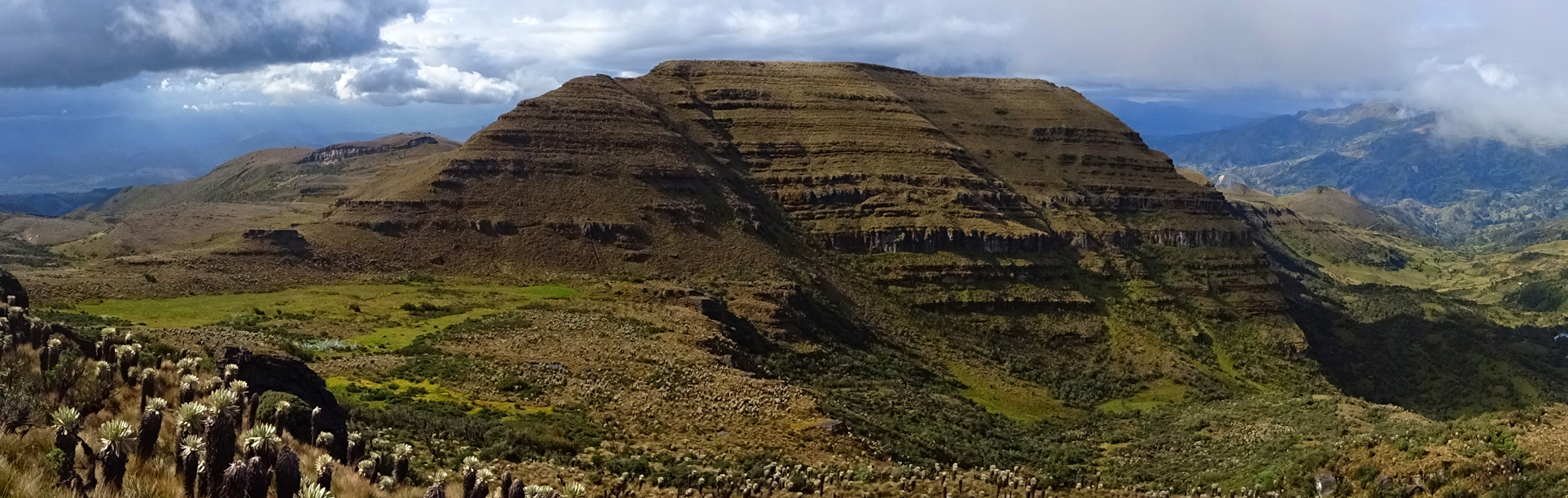
Panorama of the Cerro de Águilas

==== Mirador de Cóndores ====
The Mirador de Cóndores (English: "Condor Viewpoint") is the highest point of the páramo and offers a view on the Laguna Negra. Andean condors can be sighted from this viewpoint.

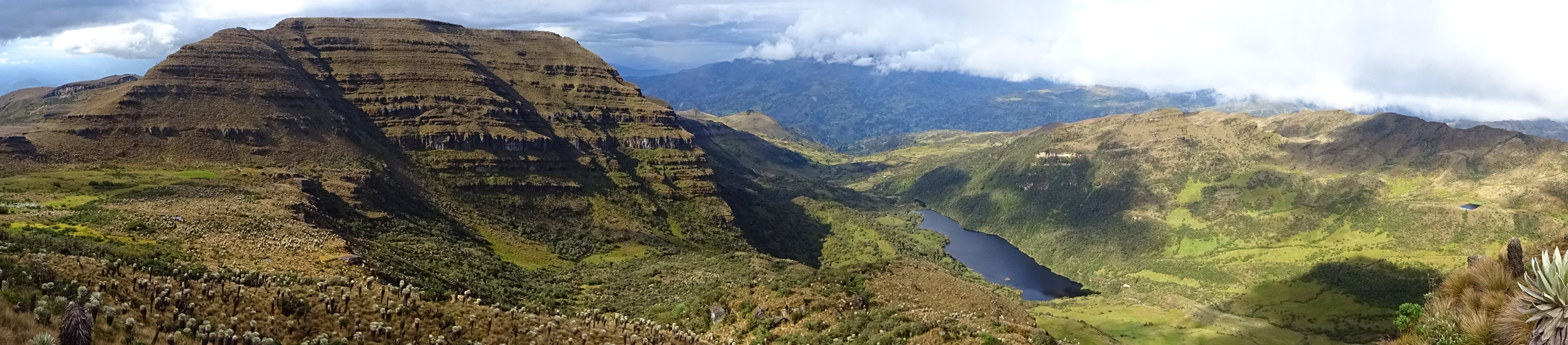
Panorama from the Mirador de Cóndores

==== Laguna Negra ====
Laguna Negra (English: "Black Lake") is a permanent lake on the páramo that can be viewed from the Cerro de Águilas or the Mirador de Cóndores. The lake drains towards Mongua and it is possible to reach from that village. Legend tells that a young boy is living in the lake, whose singing can be heard close to the Penagos waterfall.

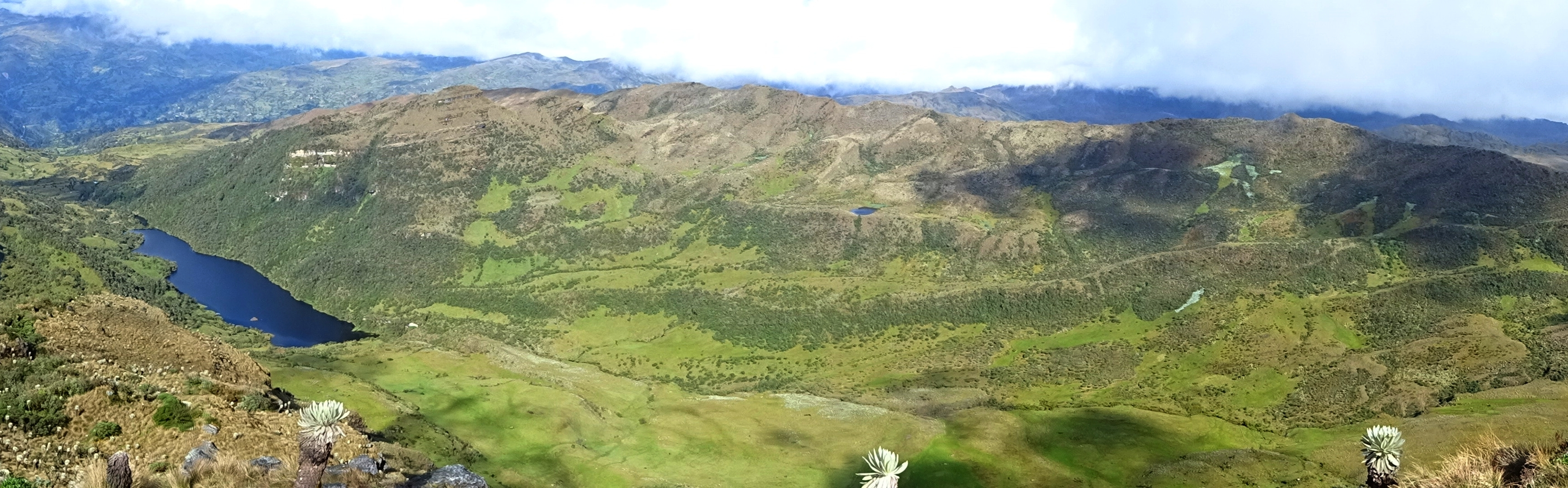
Panorama of Laguna Negra and feeder creeks

== Tourism ==
The Ocetá Páramo is mostly accessed from Monguí along the Camino de la Otra Vida; a full-day hike, ascending and back descending 1,000 metres (3,300 ft), that takes between six and eleven hours. A steep and pebbly access to the Ocetá Páramo is indicated with a gate called Portal de la Gloria. It is possible to access the páramo by horse and do wild camping on the páramo. The use of a trained guide is recommended, as the journey contains many paths and the sudden mist can be cold and dangerous due to the loss of orientation. The best months to visit the páramo are November and December.

An alternative route towards the Ocetá Páramo starts in Mongua and reaches the Laguna Negra first.

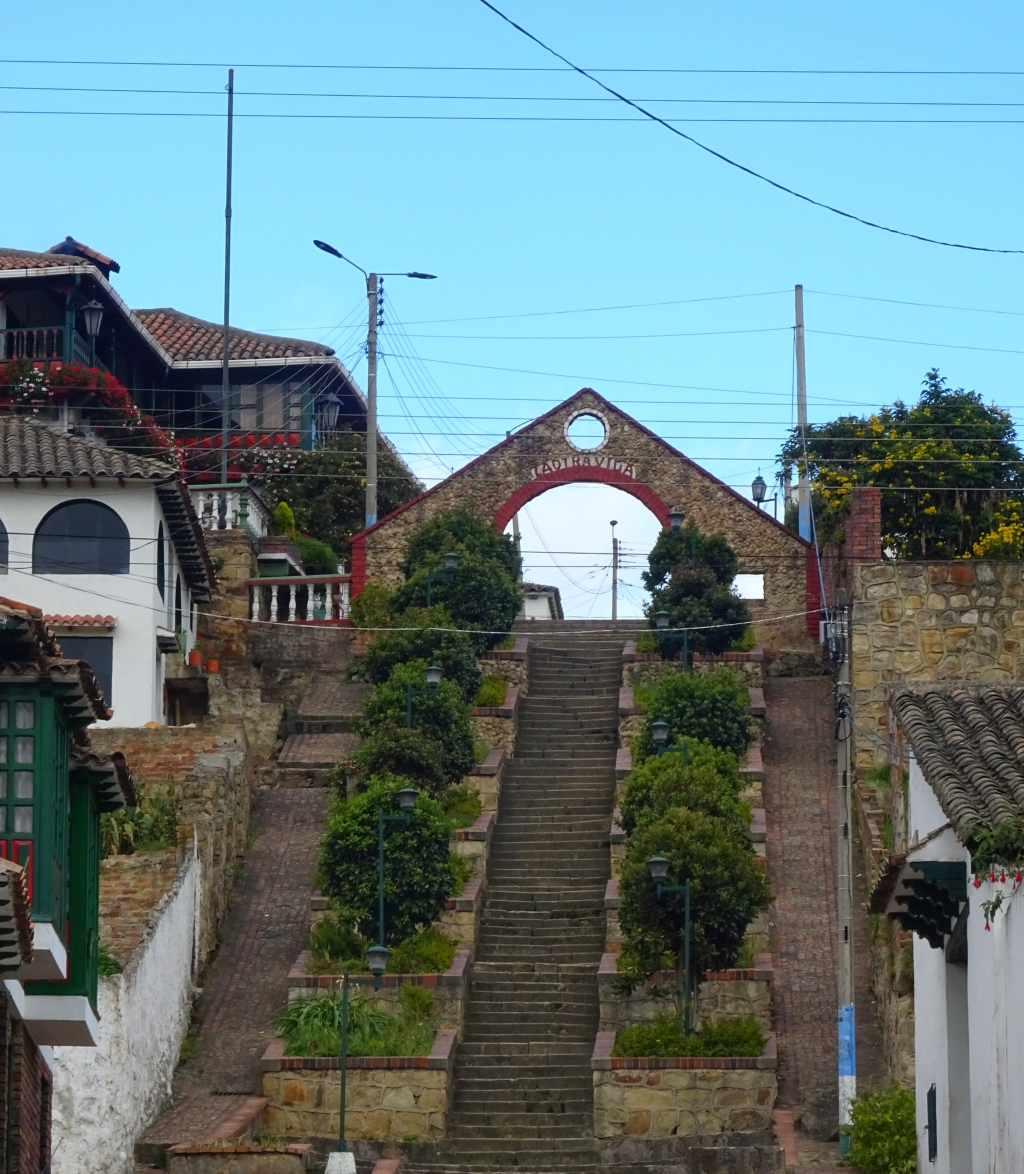
Camino La Otra Vida; access from Monguí to the Páramo

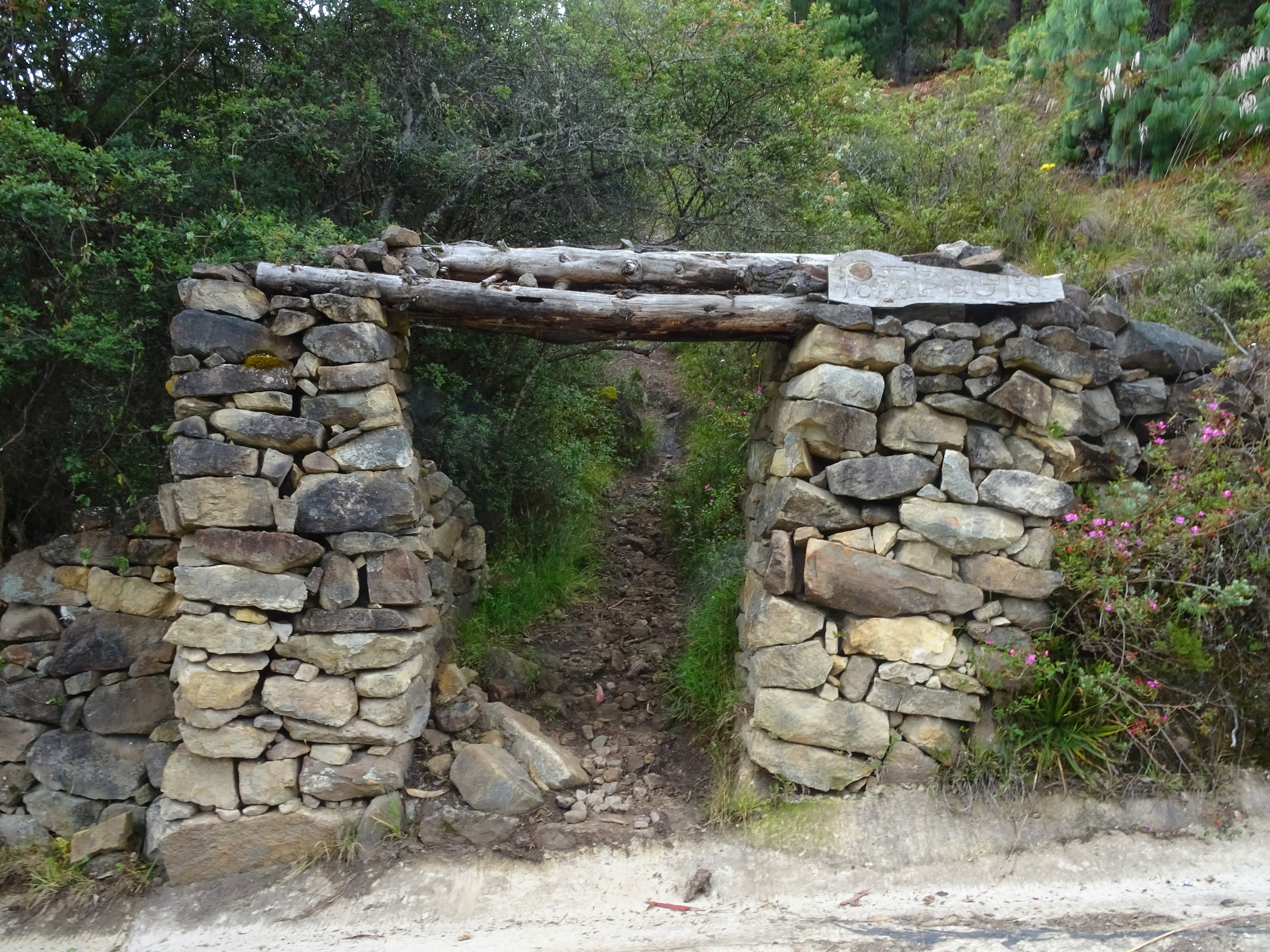
Portal de la Gloria

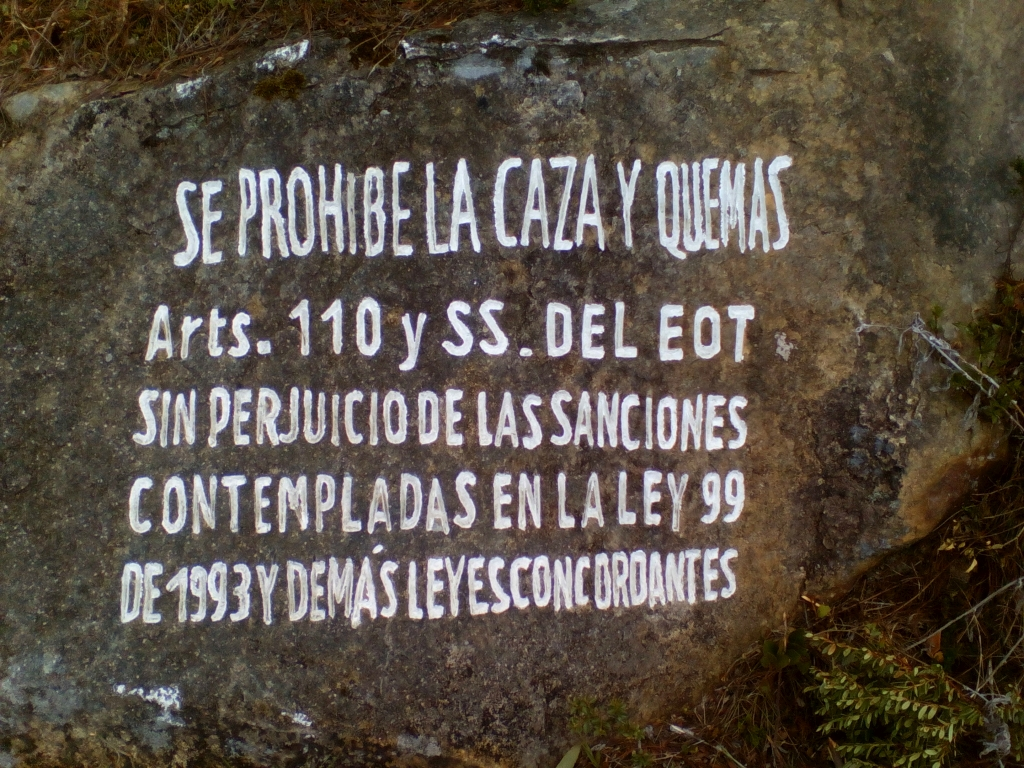
Hunting and making fires is forbidden

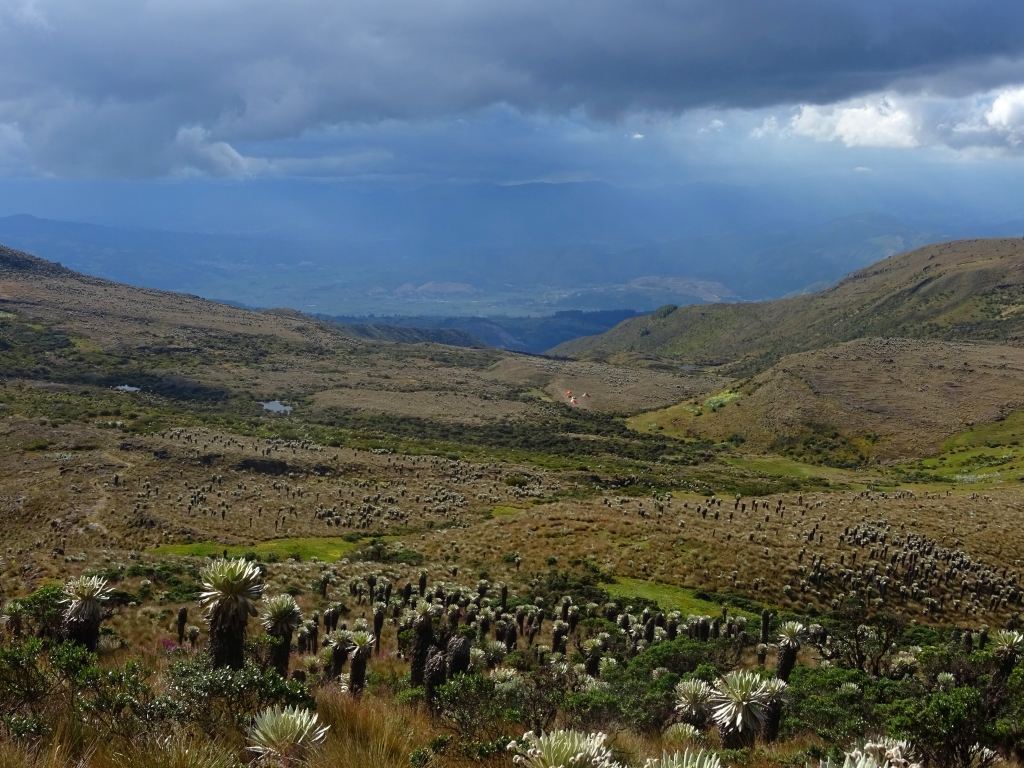
Wild camping on the Ocetá Páramo

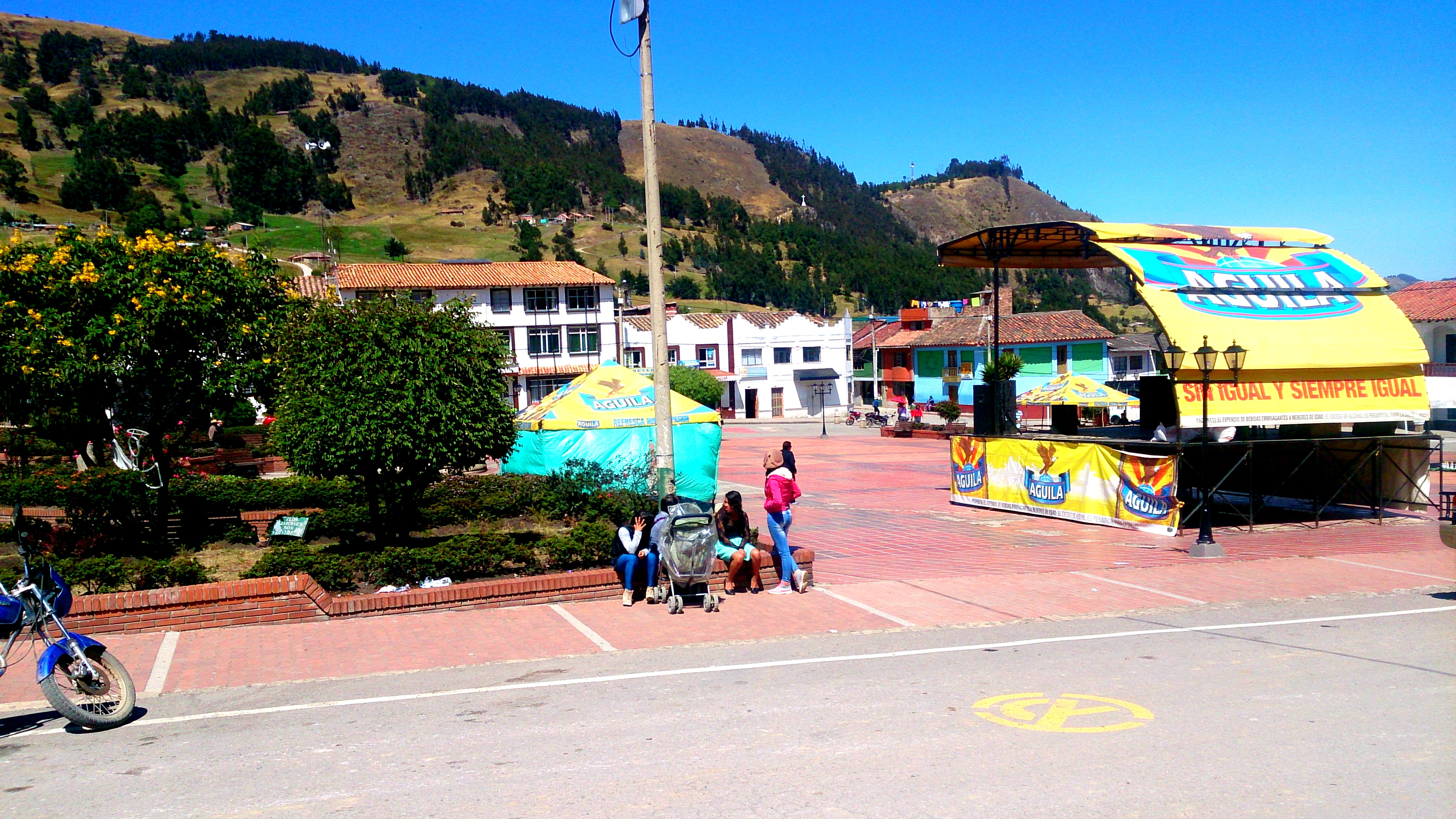
Mongua gives an alternative access to the Páramo

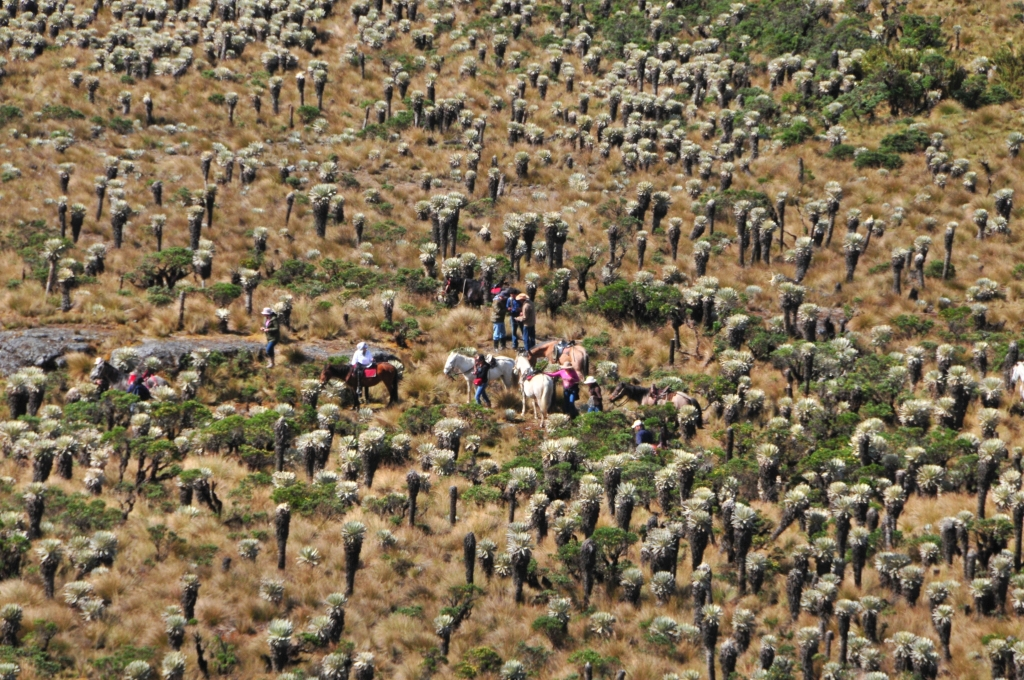
Horseriders on the Páramo

== See also ==
- Páramo
- Sumapaz Páramo, Chingaza National Natural Park, Monguí
- Muisca mythology, religion
