= Nathan J. Robinson (biologist) =

Marine biologist and environmentalist

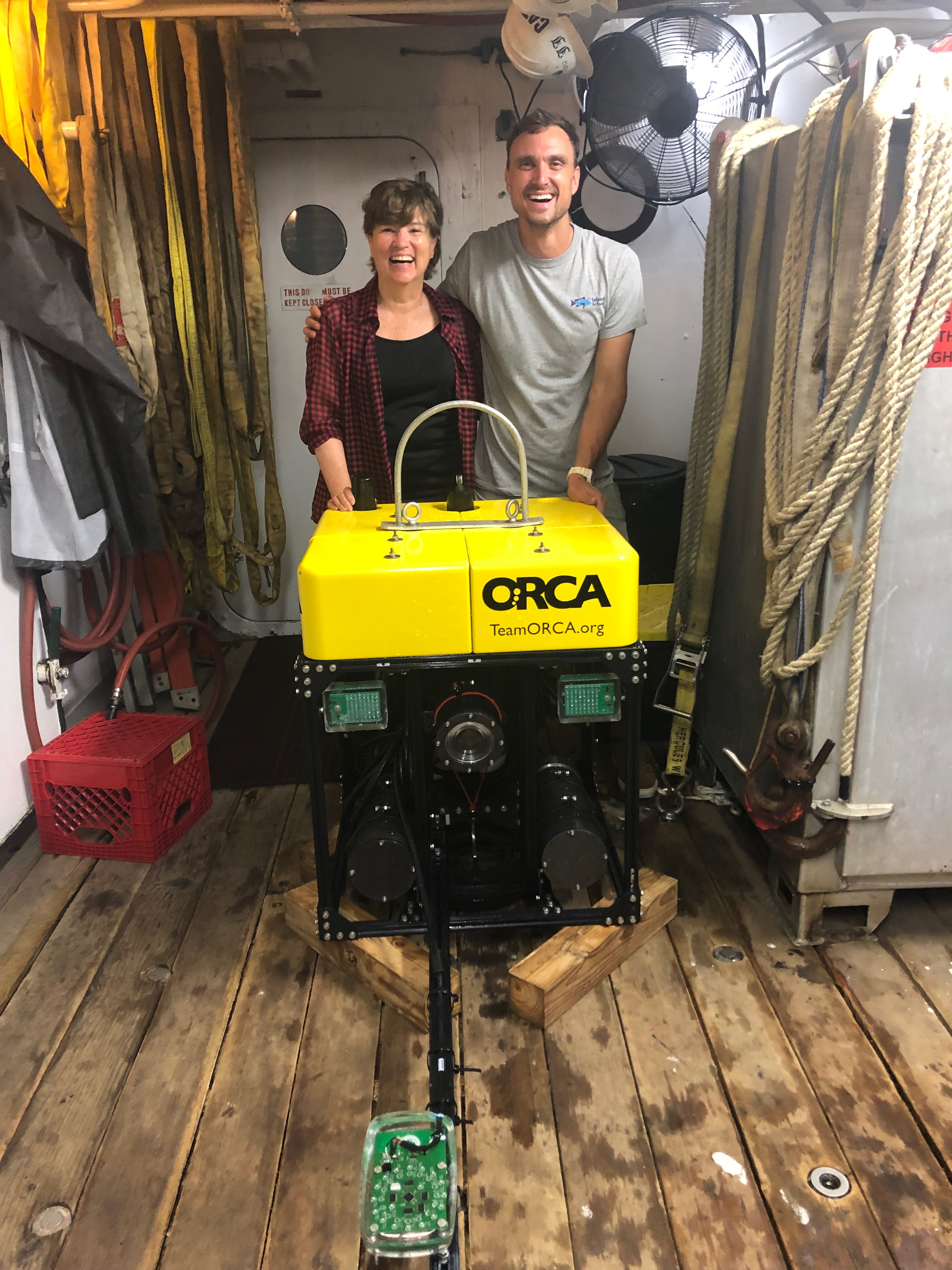
- Robinson (right) and Edith Widder (left) with the MEDUSA, a deep-sea camera that recorded the first-ever footage of a live giant squid in the waters of Japan and the US
- Born: Nathan Jack Robinson
- Citizenship: British
- Education: University of Southampton (MMarBiol 2009); Purdue University (Ph.D. 2014)
- Known for: Starring in several viral videos, including removing a straw from a sea turtle's nostril and filming a live giant squid
- Scientific career
- Fields: Marine biology and science communication
- Workplaces: Institut de Ciències del Mar, Barcelona. L'Oceanogràfic
- Thesis: Migratory Ecology of Sea Turtles (2014)
- Doctoral advisor: Frank Paladino

Nathan Jack Robinson is a marine biologist and science communicator from the United Kingdom. During his career, Robinson has been at the center of several viral videos. These have included videos of him removing a plastic drinking straw from the nostril of a sea turtle as well as a plastic fork from the nostril of a different sea turtle, and a video recorded by him and Edith Widder of a live giant squid. This video is the first-time that a live giant squid has been recorded in US waters and is the second time this species has ever been caught alive on film.

== Early life and education ==
Robinson grew up in the United Kingdom. He earned a Masters of Marine Biology at the University of Southampton in 2009, receiving the awarded for the highest achieving MSc student of his graduating class. Nathan's MSc focused on learning how shallow-water marine species might adapt to deeper habitats. While completing his MSc program, he also began volunteering with the ARCHELON, the Sea Turtle Protection Society of Greece. He followed his interest in sea turtle conservation into a Ph.D. program at Purdue University under the mentor-ship of Frank V. Paladino. His Ph.D. thesis focused on understanding the factors driving the migratory behavior of sea turtles.

== Research and impact ==
In 2015, Robinson was awarded a postdoctoral fellowship through Purdue University Fort Wayne to manage the research activities of the Leatherback Trust in Costa Rica. During this fellowship, Robinson joined a Texas A&M research expedition collecting data in northwest Costa Rica to sample olive ridley sea turtles for epibionts. While Robinson was examining a turtle for epibionts, he discovered something in a turtle's nostril. Upon removing the foreign object, it was revealed to be a plastic drinking straw. Expedition leader Christine Figgener recorded this video, which subsequently went viral and has inspired several anti-plastic straw campaigns worldwide.

Two months after removing the straw, Robinson was again studying olive ridley turtles on Playa Ostional, Costa Rica and had a similar encounter. However, this time the object being removed was a plastic fork. This video, recorded by Sean Williamson, also went viral and prompted several other campaigns against single-use plastics.

Following the impact of these two videos, Robinson began to focus his research activities on using novel visual technologies to generate engaging footage for the purposes of scientific discovery and environmental outreach. This has included projects using drones, animal-borne cameras, and deep-sea cameras.

In 2019, Nathan was working alongside Edith Widder in the Gulf of Mexico where they were able to film a live giant squid. This video was the first-time that a live giant squid has been recorded in US waters, is the second time this species has ever been caught alive on film.

In 2022, Nathan was invited to present at Gresham College to give a talk entitled "Going Viral: An Environmental Activist's Story".

In 2024, Nathan was nominated as one of the Explorer's Club 50: Fifty People Changing the World/

== Career ==
Between 2015 and 1017, Nathan was Director of the Leatherback Trust in Costa Rica and a postdoctoral fellow at Purdue University Fort Wayne. Between 2017 and 2019, Nathan was Director of the Cape Eleuthera Institute in The Bahamas. Since 2019, Nathan has worked for L'Oceanogràfic and the Institut de Ciències del Mar, Barcelona.

== Publications ==
Nathan is the author of several scientific publications, conference papers, and reports
