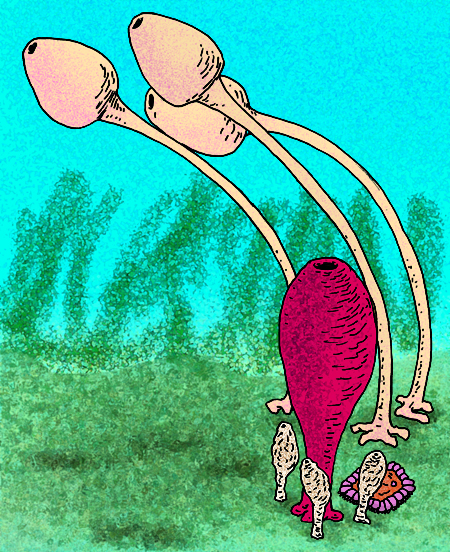
- S. pyriformis & S. tulipa

Scientific classification
- Domain: Eukaryota
- Kingdom: Animalia
- Phylum: Porifera
- Class: Demospongiae
- Family: †Siphoniidae
- Genus: †Siphonia; Goldfuss, 1826

Species
- †S. pyriformis; †S. tulipa; †S. koenigi; †S. lycoperdites; †S. praemorsa; †S. tubulosa; †S. benstedii; †S. pulchra

= Siphonia =

Siphonia Temporal range: 125–66 Ma Early to Late Cretaceous (Aptian to Maastrichtian)

Extinct genus of sponges

Siphonia is a genus of extinct hallirhoid demosponges of the Lower and Upper Cretaceous, from about 125 to 66 million years ago. They lived in the Western Tethys Ocean, in what is now Europe.

== Description ==
They all had distinctive pear-shaped bodies that were attached to the seafloor via a long stem. Their common name, "tulip sponges," refers to their suggestive shape, while the genus name refers to how the spongocoel (the main tube of the sponge body) runs almost the entire length of the sponge, as though it were almost a drinking straw.

== Gallery ==
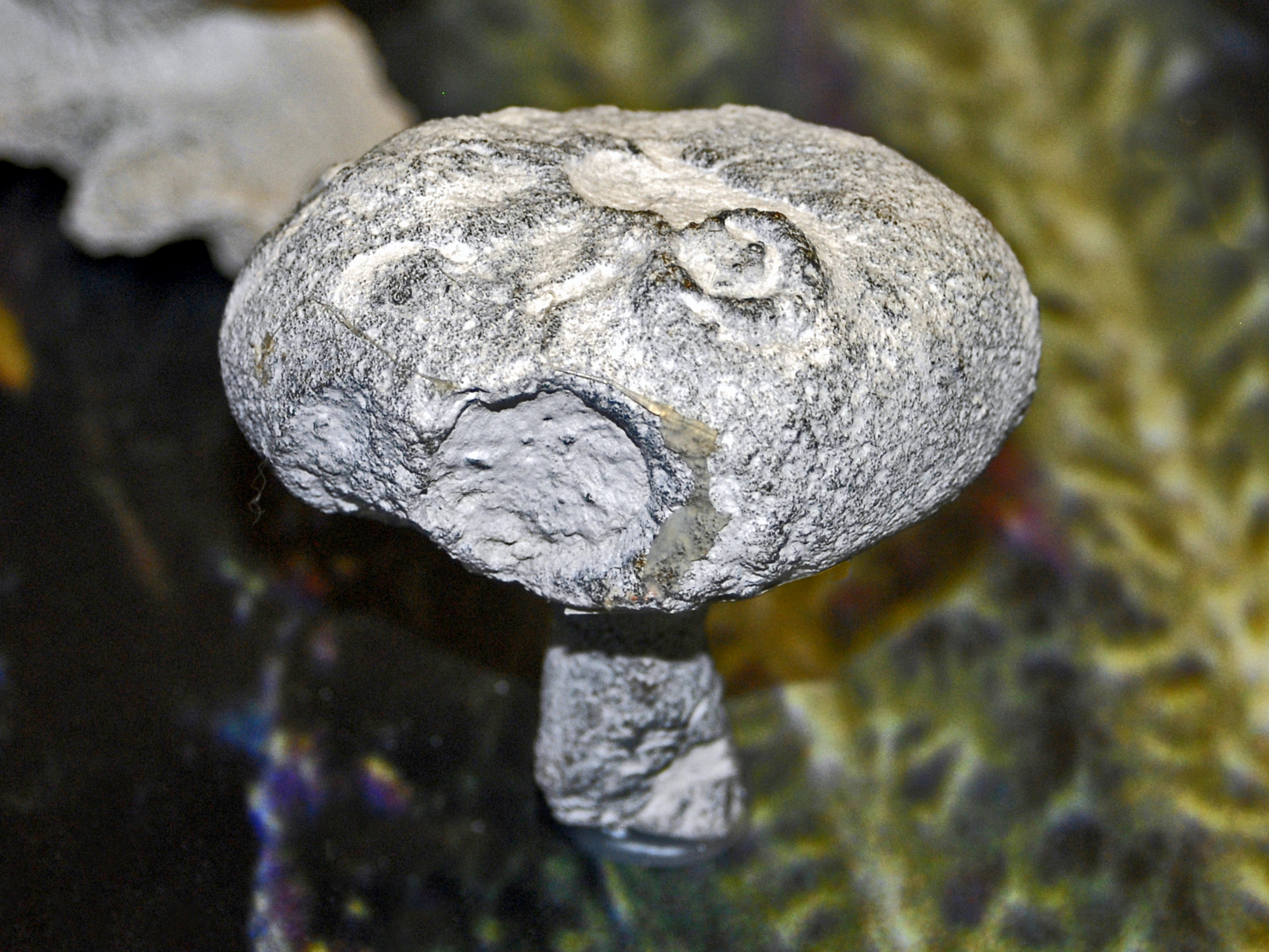
Siphonia lycoperdites , on display at the Museo Civico di Storia Naturale di Milano

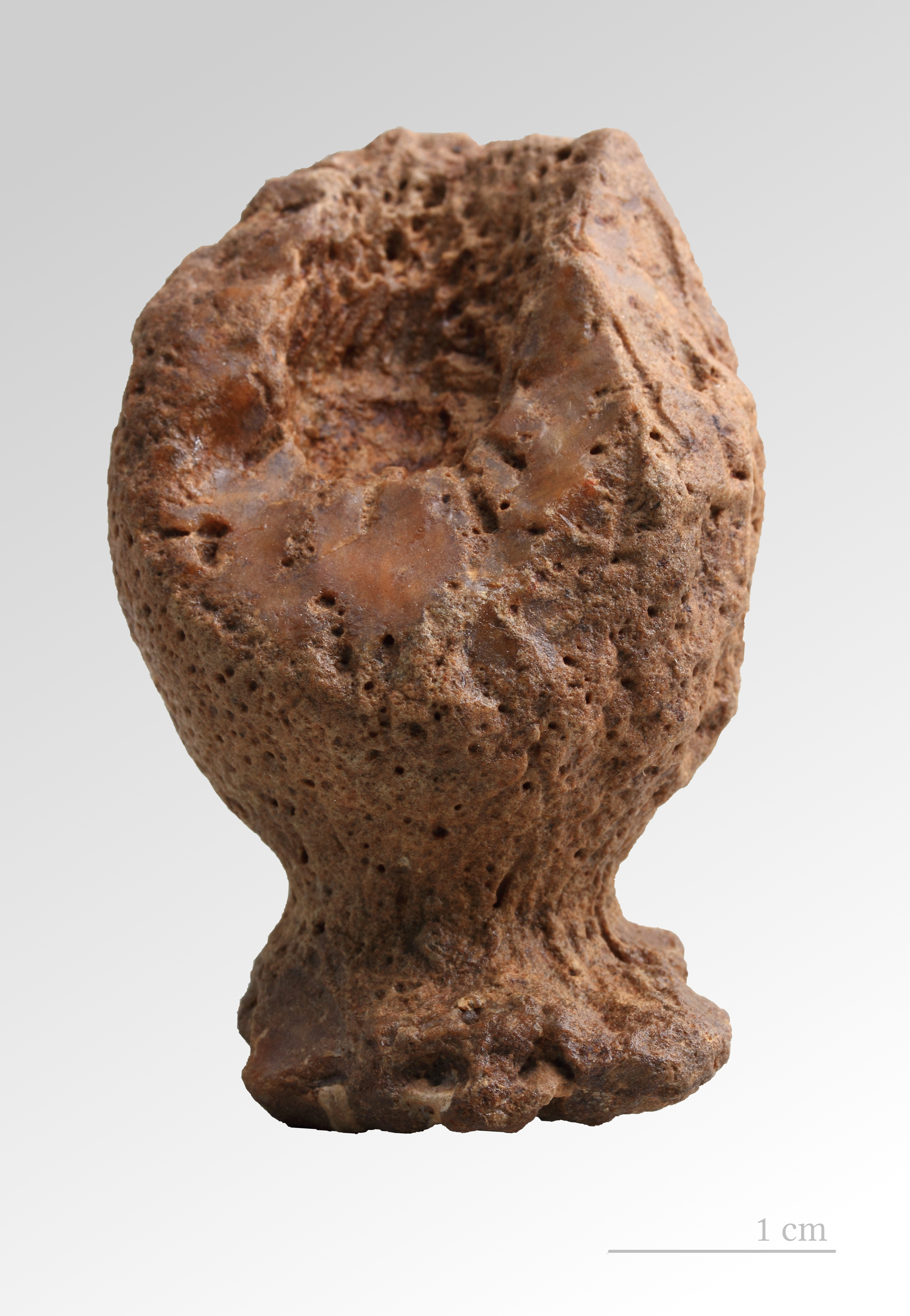
Siphonia pyriformis - Muséum de Toulouse (fr)
