= Executive Order 14208 =

2025 U.S. executive order ending the use of paper straws

- Ending Procurement and Forced Use of Paper Straws
- Front page of Executive Order 14208
- Type: Executive order
- Number: 14208
- President: Donald Trump
- Signed: February 10, 2025

Federal Register details
- Federal Register document number: 2025-02735
- Publication date: February 14, 2025

Executive Order 14208, titled "Ending Procurement and Forced Use of Paper Straws", is an executive order signed by U.S. president Donald Trump in an attempt to end the use of paper straws and returning the use of plastic straws.

== Background ==
According to the nonprofit magazine Grist, advocacy against single-use plastic straws in the United States began around 2011. At that time, the national media widely reported on research that had been conducted by a child from Vermont, using information provided by plastic straw manufacturers, that showed that the United States disposed of approximately 500 million plastic straws daily. Later studies showed that the actual value was lower, at between 170 million and 390 million. The push against the use of plastic straws received another boon in 2015, when a marine biologist published a video showing a turtle having a plastic straw that had become lodged in its nostrils removed. Around this time, plastic straw bans began to be implemented in various jurisdictions around the world, including Taiwan and the Australian state of Queensland, with straws made of alternative materials, such as paper and nonpetroleum bioplastics, largely replacing them. In the United States, the market share of plastic straws declined from nearly 100 percent to about 75 percent between 2017 and 2022. The push against plastic straws is part of a larger effort to reduce plastic pollution, as roughly 40 percent of plastic production is for single-use plastic products, such as straws.

By 2025, many companies had begun initiatives to phase out single-use plastic products, and several states, counties, and cities, had prohibitions on plastic straws. In 2024, Joe Biden, during his presidency, introduced policy that sought to phase out the purchase of single-use plastic products by the federal government of the United States starting in 2027, with additional phase-outs by the 2030s. At the time, the federal government was the single largest purchaser of plastic straws in the country, supplying them in federal offices, national parks, and other federal properties.

== Executive order ==
Donald Trump has been a vocal critic of paper straws, saying of his opponents during his 2020 presidential reelection campaign, "They want to ban straws. Has anyone tried those paper straws? They're not working too good." He further attacked them as "liberal" and stated that they fall apart during use. In 2019, his campaign team sold Trump-branded plastic straws at $15 (equivalent to $19 in 2025) per 10-pack, generating almost $500,000 ($630,000 in 2025) in sales.

On February 10, 2025, several weeks into his second term as president, Trump signed the executive order, which rescinded Biden's phaseout of single-use plastic by the federal government. As part of the order, Trump stated that he was bringing an end to the "irrational campaign against plastic straws," and said that it is "the policy of the United States to end the use of paper straws". The order specifically called on the federal government to stop purchasing paper straws and called for the creation of a "National Strategy to End the Use of Paper Straws" within 45 days of the order's promulgation. During the signing in the Oval Office, Trump said:

We're going back to plastic straws. (Paper straws) don't work. They break. They explode If something's hot. They don't last very long, like a matter of minutes, sometimes a matter of seconds. It's a ridiculous situation.

Concerning the environmental impact of plastic straws, he said, "I don't think that plastic is going to affect the shark very much as they're eating, as they're munching their way through the ocean."

== Response ==
Regarding the order, Forbes reported on it in the context of other anti-environmentalist actions undertaken by Trump early in his second presidency, which have included withdrawing the United States from the Paris Agreement and proposing the opening up of area in the Arctic National Wildlife Refuge for oil drilling. The order has additionally drawn condemnation from many environmental activists and organizations, such as Oceana. In contrast, the order has been viewed positively by representatives of the plastics industry. Margaret Hartmann, the senior editor for the Intelligencer website of New York magazine, humorously posited that the order may stem from Trump's phobia of sharks.
