= Flav-R-Straws =

Flavored drinking straw

Flav-R-Straws were a form of drinking straw with a flavoring included, designed to make drinking milk more pleasant for children. They were first marketed in the United States in 1956 by Flav-R-Straws Inc. The product became highly successful. They were widely promoted through an advertising campaign that included double-page advertisements in LIFE magazine. In the 1956 movie Beyond a Reasonable Doubt, an ad for "Flav-r Straws" makes a brief but conspicuous appearance on a brick wall, behind the actors, almost half-way into the film.

Flav-R-Straws were withdrawn from the market in 1961 due to their relatively high cost compared with Nestlé Quik and other relatively low-cost milk additives such as Bosco Chocolate Syrup and Hershey's Chocolate Syrup. In recent years, newer variations of the original idea have been resurrected in forms such as Sipahhs, and Milk Magic Straws that contain hundreds of flavored pellets encased within a stiff plastic straw.
