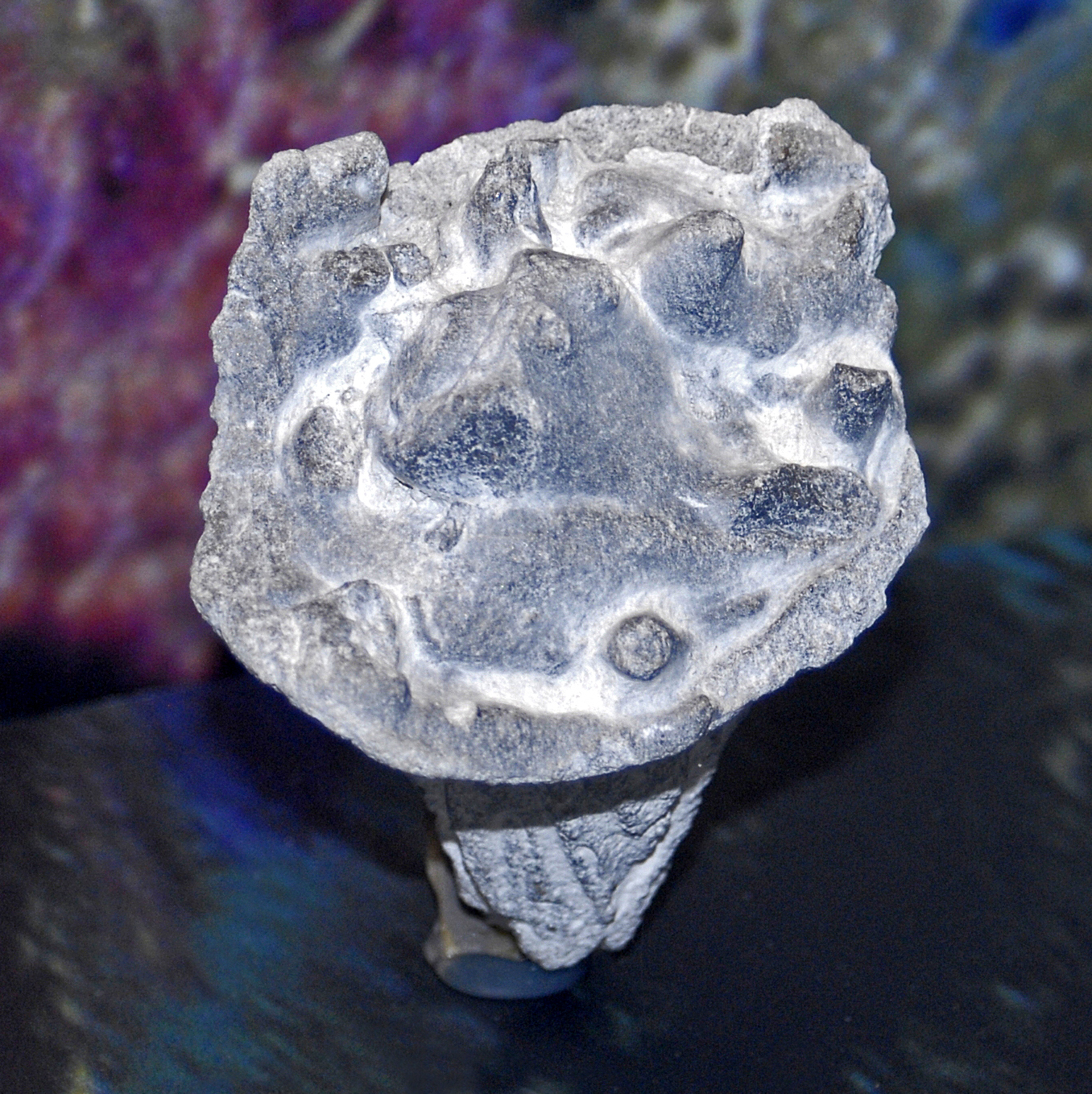
- Turonia variabilis from France

Scientific classification
- Kingdom: Animalia
- Phylum: Porifera
- Class: Demospongiae
- Family: †Siphoniidae
- Genus: †Turonia; Michelin, 1847

= Turonia =

Turonia Temporal range: Cretaceous

Extinct genus of sponges

Turonia is an extinct genus of sea sponges belonging to the class Demospongiae.

== Fossil records ==
This genus is known in the fossil record of the Cretaceous of France, Germany, Poland and Spain (about 125 to 66 million years ago).

== Species ==
- Turonia cerebriformis Schrammen 1910
- Turonia constricta Zittel 1878
- Turonia globosa Wagner 1963
- Turonia induta Zittel 1878
- Turonia variabilis Michelin 1847 (type species)
