= Marvin Stone =

American inventor (1842-1899)

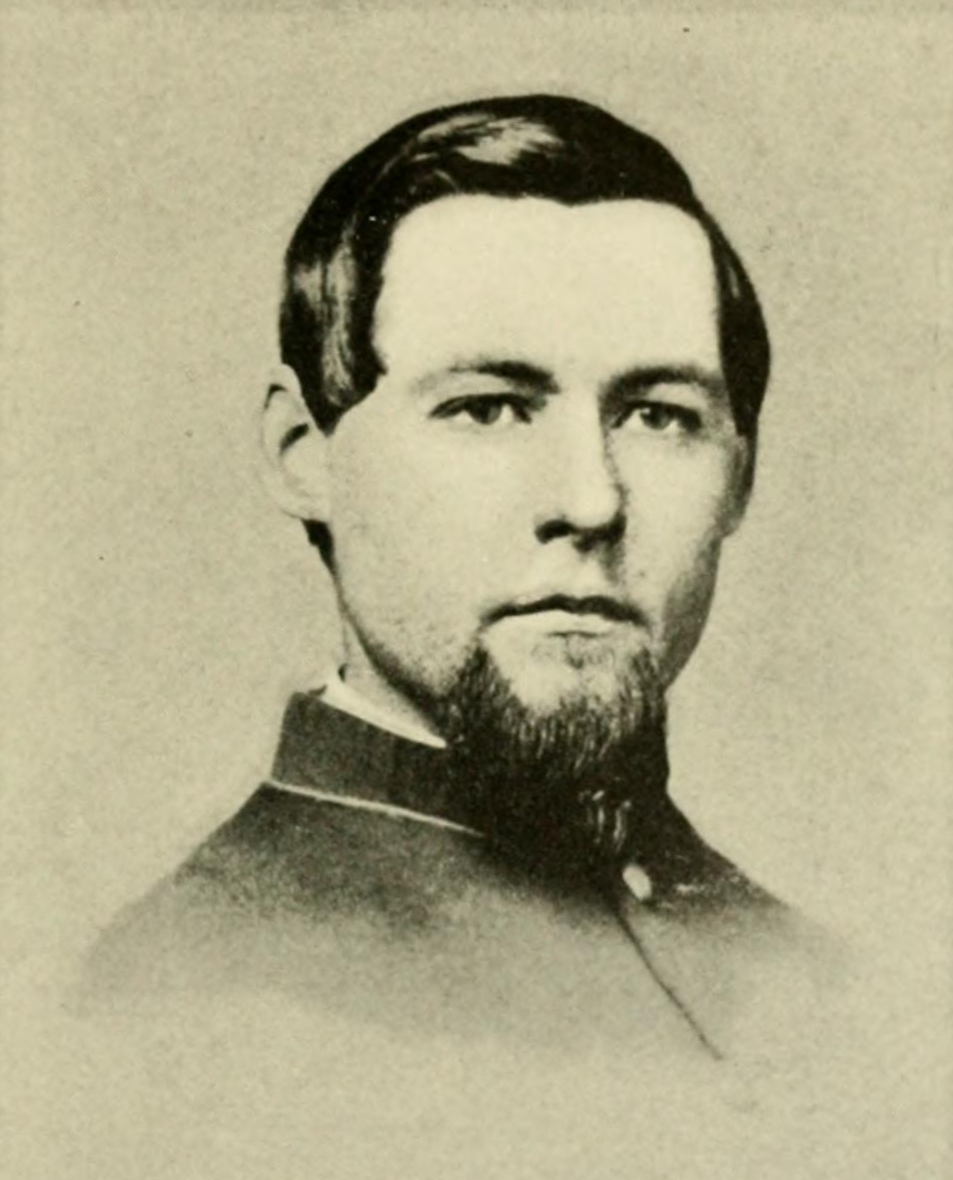
- Stone during the Civil War
- Born: Marvin Chester Stone; April 4, 1842; Portage County, Ohio, U.S.
- Died: May 17, 1899 (aged 57); Washington, D.C., U.S.
- Resting place: Green Mount Cemetery, Baltimore, Maryland, U.S.
- Occupation: Inventor
- Spouse: Jane "Jennie" Platt

Marvin Chester Stone (April 4, 1842 – May 17, 1899) was an American inventor. He is best known for inventing the modern drinking straw.

== Early life ==
Stone was born in Portage County, Ohio, in 1842. The son of an inventor, Stone made many useful articles in his boyhood. He was a graduate of Oberlin College, although his course of study was interrupted by his service in the Civil War. During the Civil War, Stone served in the 7th Ohio Regiment. He was injured in the Battle of Lookout Mountain, and sent to Washington D.C. on special duty with the Veteran Reserve Corps.

After college, Stone began a theological course, but abandoned it to go to Washington, D.C. where he was employed as a newspaper correspondent for several years.

== Career ==
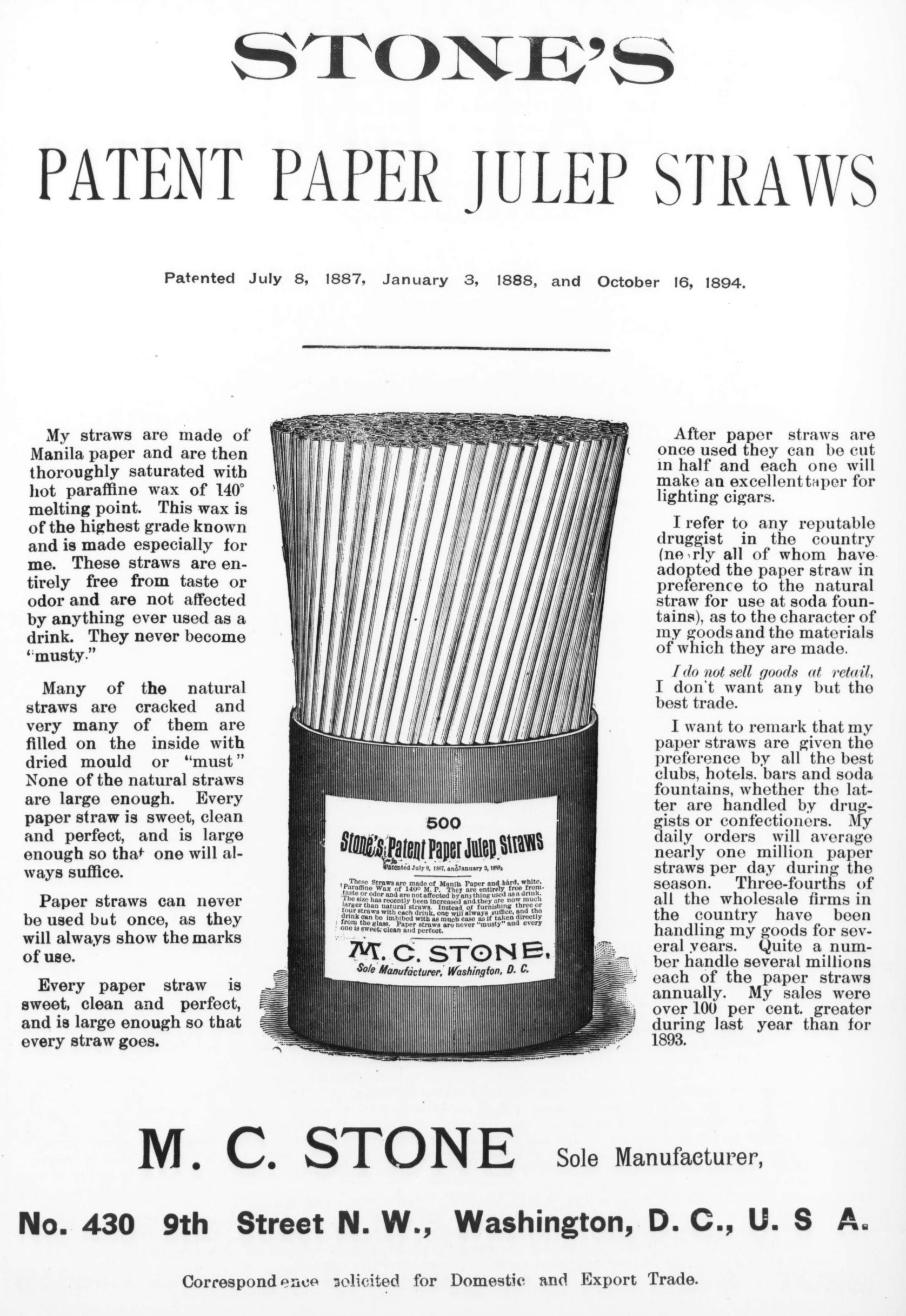
1895 advertisement for Stone's paper straws

Stone began his career as an inventor by creating a machine to make paper cigarette holders. Stone secured a contract with the W. Duke Sons & Co. and opened a factory in Washington, D.C. to produce cigarette holders for the company's Cameo brand of cigarettes.

Later, Stone developed the modern drinking straw. Prior to Stone's invention, people used natural rye grass straws, which imparted an undesirable grassy flavor in beverages. To combat the problem, Stone made the first drinking straw prototypes by spiraling a strip of paper around a pencil and gluing it at the ends. Next he experimented with paraffin wax-coated manila paper, so that the straw would not get soggy when used. Stone's straws were 8 ½ inches long and had a diameter just wide enough to prevent things like fruit pips from getting lodged in the tube.

Stone received the patent of the "artificial straw" on January 3, 1888. It was made out of paper. By 1890, Stone's factory was producing more drinking straws than cigarette holders.

Stone invented a number of other items during his career, including a kind of fountain pen and an umbrella.

== Personal life ==
Stone was married to Jane "Jennie" Platt.

== Later life and death ==
Stone used the newfound wealth from his straw business for a variety of philanthropic causes. He furnished lodging for his female employees, including a large library, music room, meeting room, and dancing floor. In addition, he and several others built two blocks of tenement houses for African American residents of Washington, D.C.

Stone died at his home on Columbia Road in Washington, D.C., on May 17, 1899, after a long illness. He was buried in Green Mount Cemetery.
