= Joseph Friedman =

American inventor (1900–1982)

Joseph B. Friedman (October 9, 1900 – June 21, 1982) was an independent American inventor with a broad range of interests and ideas. Friedman was a first generation American and the fifth of eight children of Jewish-American immigrants.

== Early years ==
Friedman was born in Cleveland, Ohio. By the age of fourteen, had conceptualized his first invention, the lighted pencil, which he deemed the "pencilite," and was attempting to market his idea. Over the course of his inventing career, he would experiment with ideas ranging from writing implements to engine improvements, and household products to sound and optic experiments. He was issued nine U.S. patents and held patents in Great Britain, Australia and Canada. His first patent was issued for improvements to the fountain pen on April 18, 1922. This was also the first invention that he successfully sold, to the Sheaffer Pen Company in the mid-1930s.

In the 1920s, Friedman began his education in real estate and optometry. He would use both of these careers at different points in his life to supplement his income while improving his invention concepts. Although he was working as a realtor in San Francisco, California, the 1930s proved to be his most prolific patenting period, with six of his nine U.S. patents being issued then. One of these patents would prove to be his most successful invention - the flexible drinking straw.

== Invention of the flexible straw ==
While sitting in his younger brother Albert's fountain parlor, the Varsity Sweet Shop in San Francisco (200 19th Avenue), Friedman observed his young daughter Judith at the counter, struggling to drink out of a straight straw. He took a paper straight straw, inserted a screw and using dental floss, he wrapped the paper into the screw threads, creating corrugations. After removing the screw, the altered paper straw would bend conveniently over the edge of the glass, allowing small children to better reach their beverages. U.S. patent #2,094,268 was issued for this new invention under the title Drinking Tube, on September 28, 1937. Friedman would later file and be issued two additional U.S. patents and three foreign patents in the 1950s relating to its formation and construction. Friedman attempted to sell his straw patent to several existing straw manufacturers beginning in 1937 without success, so after completing his straw machine, he began to produce the straw himself.

== The Flexible Straw Corporation ==
The Flexible Straw Corporation was incorporated on April 24, 1939 in California. However, World War II interrupted Friedman's efforts to construct his straw manufacturing machine. During the war, he managed the optometry practice of Arthur Euler, O.D., in Capwells' Department Store in Oakland, California, and continued to sell real estate and insurance to support his growing family. Friedman obtained financial backing for his flexible straw machine from two of his brothers-in-law, Harry Zavin and David Light, as well as from Bert Klein, a family associate. With their financial help, and the business advice of his sister Betty, Friedman completed the first flexible straw manufacturing machine in the late 1940s. Although his original concept had come from the observation of his daughter, the flexible straw was initially marketed to hospitals, with the first sale made in 1947. It is now cited as an early example of universal design.

=== Role of Betty Friedman ===
Betty Friedman played a crucial role in the development of the Flexible Straw Corporation. While still living in Cleveland and working at the Tarbonis Company, she corresponded regularly with her brother and directed all of the sales and distribution of the straw. In 1950 Friedman moved his family and company to Santa Monica, California. Now doing business as the Flex-Straw Co., sales continued to increase and the marketing direction expanded to focus more strongly on the home and child markets. Betty Friedman moved west in 1954 to assume her formal leadership role in the corporation. Additional partners and investors were added over time, including Art Shapiro, who was initially solicited as a potential buyer of the patent. On June 20, 1969, the Flexible Straw Corporation sold its United States and foreign patents, United States and Canadian trademarks, and licensing agreements to the Maryland Cup Corporation (which later became the Sweetheart Cup Company). The Flexible Straw Corporation dissolved on August 19, 1969.

== Death ==
On his death in 1982, Friedman was survived by his wife of over 50 years, Marjorie Lewis Friedman, his four children, and seven grandchildren.
