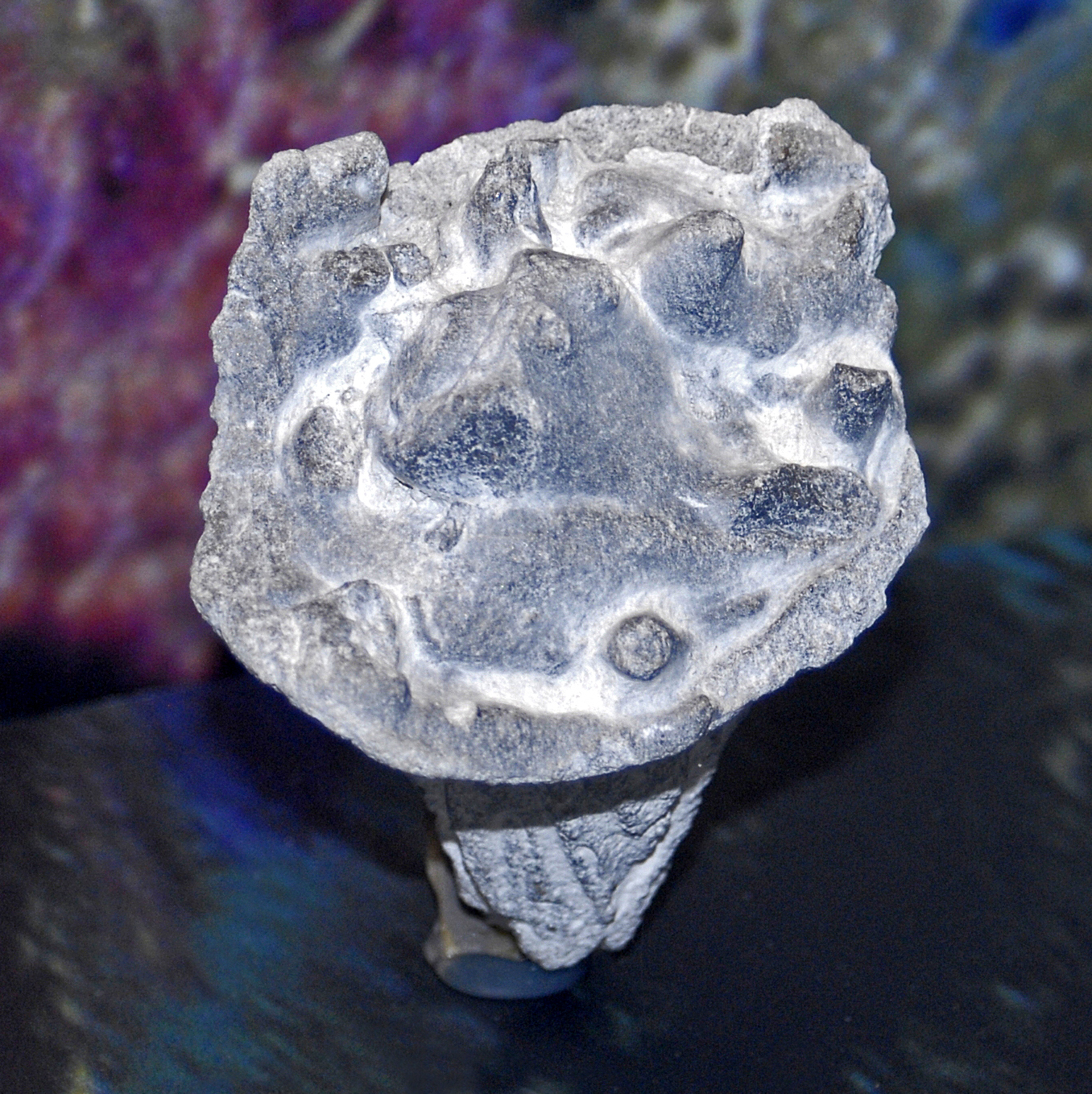
- Turonia variabilis

Scientific classification
- Kingdom: Animalia
- Phylum: Porifera
- Class: Demospongiae
- Subclass: Lithistida
- Family: †Siphoniidae d'Orbigny 1851

= Siphoniidae =

Siphoniidae Temporal range: Jurassic–Cretaceous

Extinct family of sponges

Siphoniidae is an extinct family of sea sponges belonging to the class Demospongiae.

== Fossil records ==
This family is known in the fossil records of the Jurassic and Cretaceous of Europe (from about 155.7 to 66.043 million years ago).

== Genera ==
- Aulaxinia Zittel, 1878
- Callopegma Zittel, 1878
- Calymmatina Zittel, 1878
- Craterella Schrammen, 1901
- Hallirhoa Lamouroux, 1821
- Jerea Lamouroux, 1821
- Kalpinella Hinde, 1884
- Paraspelaeum Schrammen, 1924
- Phymatella Zittel, 1878
- Phymoracia Pomel, 1872
- Polyierea Fromentel, 1860
- Siphonia Goldfuss, 1826
- Trachysycon Zittel, 1878
- Turonia Michelin, 1847
