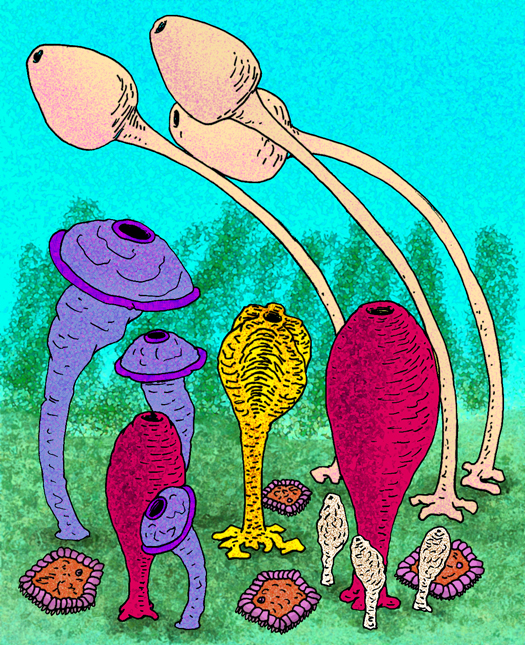
- Various Cretaceous Hallirhoiids

Scientific classification
- Domain: Eukaryota
- Kingdom: Animalia
- Phylum: Porifera
- Class: Demospongiae
- Subclass: Heteroscleromorpha
- Family: †Hallirhoidae

Genera
- Hallirhoa; Siphonia; Callopegma

= Hallirhoidae =

Hallirhoidae Temporal range: Cretaceous - Eocene

Extinct family of sponges

Hallirhoidae is an extinct family of heteroscleromorph demosponges found throughout the world from the Cretaceous to the Eocene, whereupon they became extinct. The highest concentration of species occurred in the Tethys Ocean during the upper Cretaceous. The hallirhoid demosponges were very distinctive-looking, largely pear-shaped sponges that were attached to the seafloor by a long stem-like stalk.
