= Christine Figgener =

German marine biologist

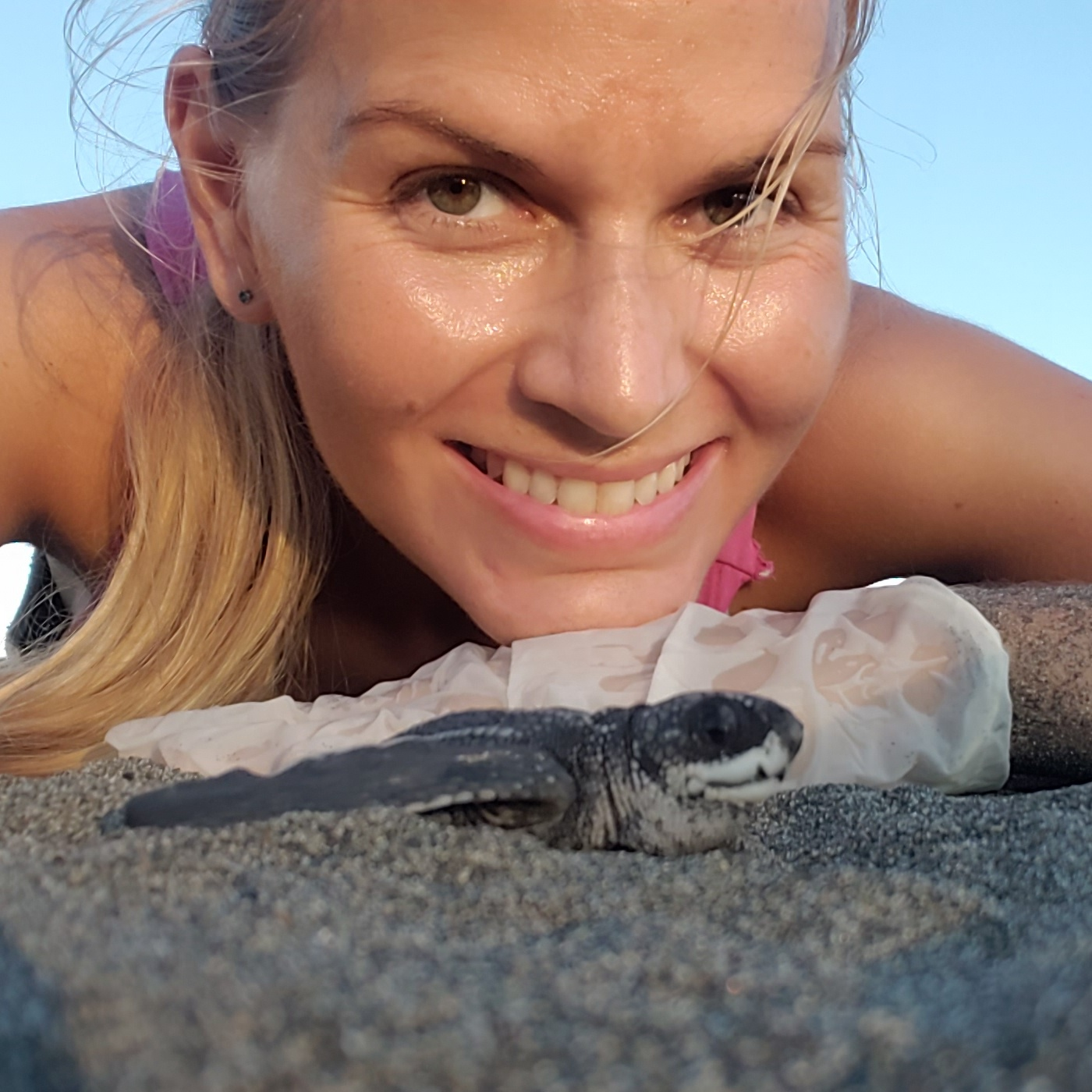
- Figgener with a baby leatherback sea turtle in 2022.
- Born: October 30, 1983 (age 42)
- Education: University of Tübingen; University of Würzburg; Texas A&M University
- Occupation: Marine biologist
- Known for: Research on sea turtles; environmental activism; fight against plastic pollution; sea turtle conservation
- Awards: Next Generation Leader (Time magazine); Ocean Hero Award (Footprint); Inspire to Influence Award (Texas Sea Grant);
- Website: www.seaturtlebiologist.com

Christine Figgener (born October 30, 1983) is a German marine biologist. She is best known for documenting the removal of a plastic straw from a sea turtle's nose in a YouTube video that went viral in 2015. This video highlighted the dangers of plastic pollution on marine wildlife and was a catalyst for the global anti-straw movement that led to several straw bans.

== Early years ==
Figgener grew up in the small, land-locked town of Marl in West Germany where she attended kindergarten, primary school, and high school. In the 11th grade, Figgener did a high school exchange to California where she went to Lindsay High School.

From a young age, Figgener was interested in ocean exploration, likely due to her parents' love for the ocean and frequent vacations close to the ocean. She had the desire to leave Germany and travel the world early in her life. Childhood friends say she already talked in primary school about becoming a marine biologist.

As a child, Figgener liked watching documentaries by Hans Hass and Jacques Yves Costeau and found a role model in Hans Hass' wife Lotte Hass, who was frequently featured in his films. Another big role model of hers was Jane Goodall, after she found the German translation of the book In the Shadow of Man at a public library sale. When Figgener was 13 she started volunteering at the dolphinarium in the Allwetter Zoo in Münster, Germany.

== Education ==
Figgener earned her German Vordiplom (Bachelor of Science) in biology in November 2005 from Eberhard-Karls-University, in Tübingen, Baden-Württemberg, Germany. In March 2010 she was awarded her German Diplom (Masters of Science) in biology from Julius-Maximilian-University, in Würzburg, Germany, majoring in behavioral physiology and animal ecology. Her thesis focused on a genetic paternity assay and general population genetics of the Caribbean leatherback sea turtle population in Costa Rica. In fall 2019, she earned her PhD in marine biology from Texas A&M University in the southern United States. Her dissertation focused on trophic and movement ecology of sea turtles using stable isotope analysis and satellite tracking to gain new insights into the behavioral ecology of olive ridley sea turtles.

== Work ==
Figgener has been working with sea turtles in Central America since 2007, focusing on applying her research findings to the conservation of these animals. Her work highlights the threats to our oceans and its inhabitants due to human impact. Figgener fosters awareness of these issues by speaking out about the difference everyone can make by changing daily habits, such as limiting the use of single-use plastic products.

Since 2020, Figgener is the director of Science & Education for Footprint Foundation, the non-profit arm of Footprint.

In 2015, Figgener was thrust into the international spotlight when she filmed the removal of a plastic straw stuck in a sea turtle's nostril while on a research expedition for her doctoral dissertation in Costa Rica. Her research team was capturing turtles off the Pacific coast when they found a turtle with something encrusted in its nose that turned out to be a plastic drinking straw. Visiting researcher Dr. Nathan Robinson, who studied ectobionts on sea turtles at that time, successfully removed the plastic straw and Figgener uploaded the video to YouTube. The video was watched and shared millions of times on different platforms and has been officially named as a catalyst for the global anti-straw movement and a turning point for the anti-plastic movement.

In 2018, Figgener was named a Next Generation Leader by Time magazine and a Texan of the Year finalist by The Dallas Morning News.

== Publications ==
Her first popular science book about sea turtles Meine Reise mit den Meereschildkröten was published in March 2023 by Malik, and in 2024 by Greystone Books in English.
