= Leatherback Trust =

Turtle conservation organization

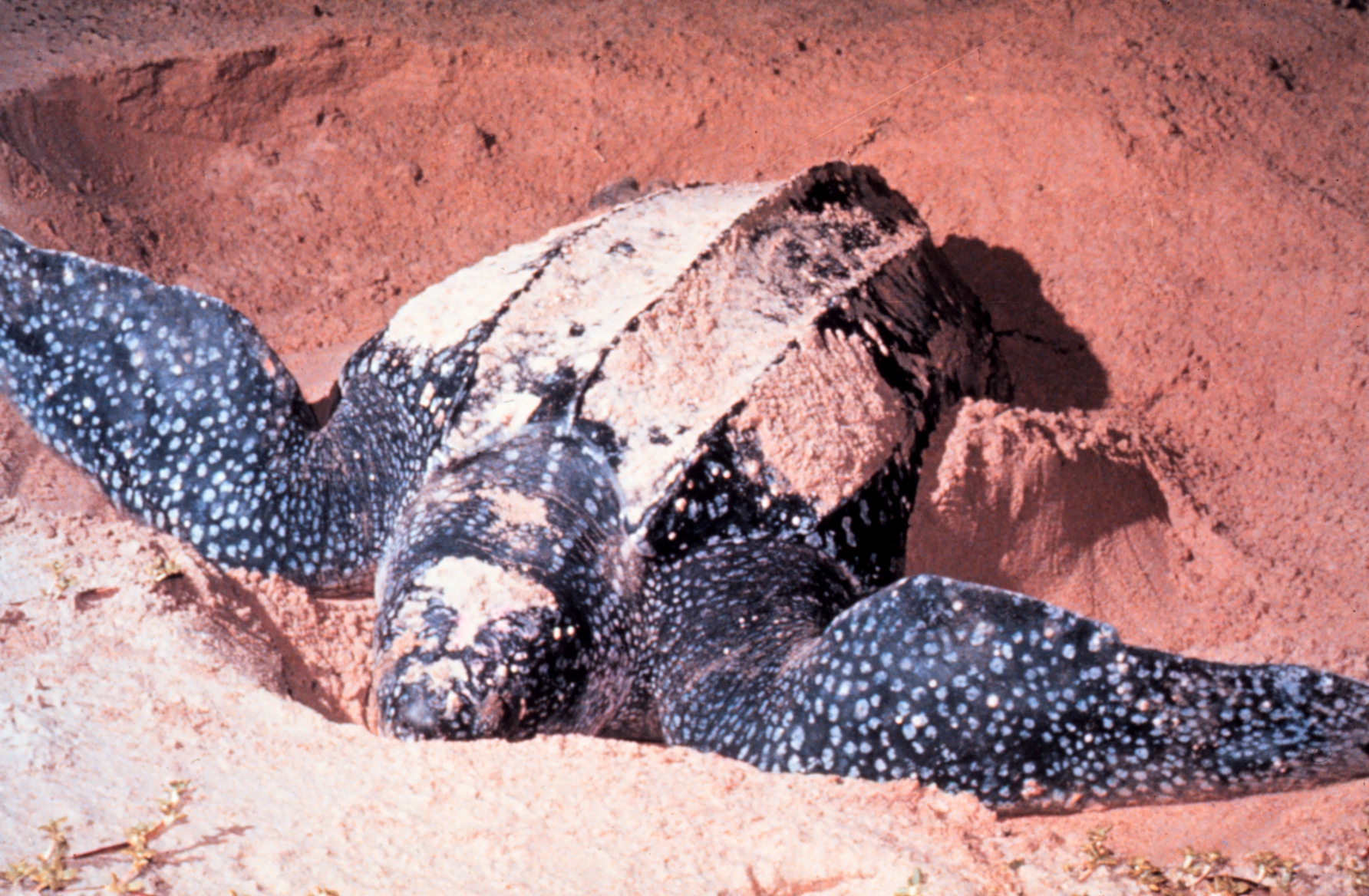
- Leatherback turtle in Costa Rica
- Established: 2000; 26 years ago
- Headquarters: Fort Wayne, Indiana and San José, Costa Rica
- Region served: Costa Rica
- Fields: Turtle conservation
- Website: leatherback.org

The Leatherback Trust is a non-profit organization dedicated to the conservation and study of sea turtles and freshwater turtles, with special regard for the leatherback sea turtle. The Leatherback Trust was founded in 2000 to help consolidate Las Baulas National Marine Park, one of the last major nesting site for the critically endangered leatherback turtle in the Eastern Pacific Ocean. The park protects Playa Grande, Playa Ventanas, Playa Langosta, the ocean out to 12 nautical miles, wetlands, highlands, and the coast inland to 125 m from the high tide line.

The Leatherback Trust also supports other sea turtle conservation initiatives throughout Costa Rica and around the world. The Leatherback Trust currently supports conservation projects for the leatherback, green and olive ridley sea turtles in Costa Rica; leatherback and loggerhead sea turtles in South Africa; loggerhead sea turtles in Greece; and hawksbill sea turtles in the US Virgin Islands.

== Las Baulas National Marine Park ==
Las Baulas National Marine Park was formed by a Presidential decree in 1991 and officially confirmed by law in 1995. Prior to the creation of the park almost 100% of all the sea turtles eggs laid in the region were collected illegally (poaching), but now this has been effectively ended. To achieve this, the Park trained former poachers as eco-tour guides. Those guides now take tourists to see nesting sea turtles. Las Baulas National Marine Park now hosts guided sea turtle tours over the entire leatherback sea turtles nesting season, spanning from October until March. The Leatherback Trust played a key role in supporting the government of Costa Rica in compensating landowners for property that was within the national park. Owners cannot build or otherwise disturb that land so it is reasonable that they receive fair compensation for the land, which then becomes part of the Park. The Leatherback Trust also recently embarked on an environmental education program at the local and national level.

== Outreach initiatives ==
Two of the most successful public outreach programs cosponsored by The Leatherback Trust were The Great Sea Turtle Race and Cheer For The Turtles. The Great Sea Turtle Race used data from satellite tracked leatherback turtles leaving their nesting beaches at Playa Grande and heading to their feeding areas south of the Galapagos Islands. Using the tracking date a hypothetical race was staged between the turtles, with the winner being the turtle who reached the Galapagos Islands first. The race, co-sponsored by Conservation International, occurred on the Internet during 2007 with the turtles sponsored by several corporations, universities and schools. It reached over two million people worldwide and was featured on the Colbert Report on the Comedy Central Channel in the US. A second Race, also co-sponsored by Conservation International, took place in 2008 and a third was hosted by National Geographic Society in 2009.

Cheer For The Turtles used data from the nesting leatherback turtle monitoring program conducted yearly at Playa Grande. Over the duration of the 2010/11 nesting season, weekly updates were provided on the nesting status (e.g. number of eggs laid per nest, number of nests etc.) of the first 6 turtles that were encountered that season. This information was adapted into an informative narrative that was accompanied by a sea turtle biology fact-sheet.
