= Unistraw =

Patented brand of drinking straw

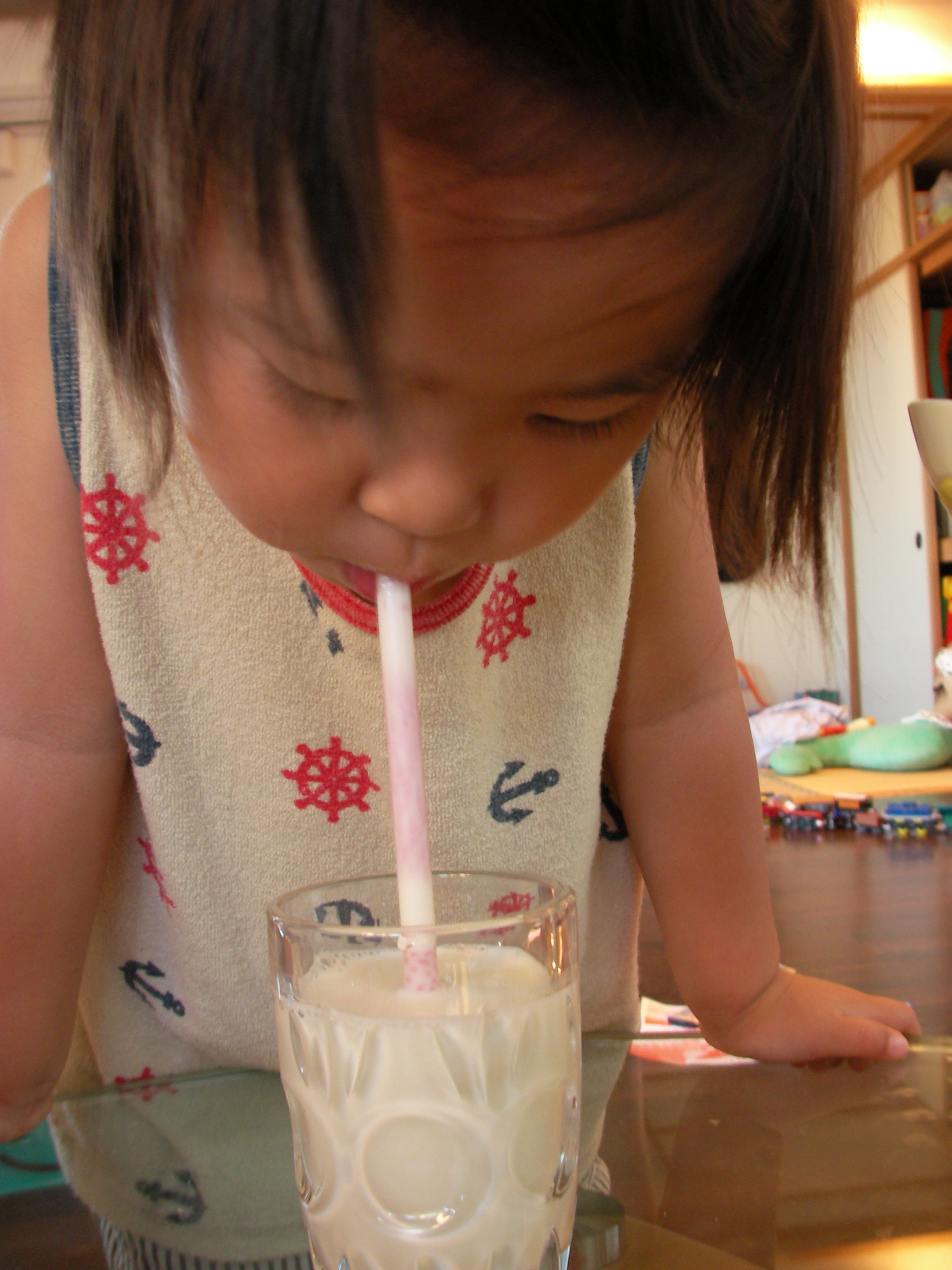
A girl drinking with a Sipahh straw

The Unistraw Delivery System (UDS) is a patented straw-delivery system created by Unistraw International Limited in 1997, and released commercially in 2005. The UDS can add flavour, energy, vitamins, nutrition, and even pharmaceuticals to liquid sipped through it.

== The Unistraw Delivery System (UDS) ==
The Unistraw Delivery System (UDS) consists of three parts: a transparent plastic straw; patented filters inserted and welded into both ends of the straw housing; and hundreds of small pellets, called UniBeads inside the straw housing. Either end of the straw is inserted into liquid. When the consumer sips through the straw, the liquid passes through the filters to dissolve the UniBeads inside, delivering the flavour or functional compounds contained within the UniBeads to the consumer. Unistraw was awarded The Australian Institute of Food Science and Technology's Food Industry Innovation Award in 2006.

== Sipahh ==
Sipahh
- Type: Milk Flavoring
- Manufacturer: Unistraw International Limited
- Country of origin: Australia
- Introduced: 2005
- Variants: Sipahh Chocolate, Sipahh Strawberry, Sipahh Banana, Sipahh Caramel, Sipahh Vanilla, Sipahh Choc-Mint, Sipahh Cookies and Cream
- Related products: Mai'a

Sipahh Milk Flavouring Straws are a range of flavouring straws that turn plain cold milk into flavoured milk as the milk is sipped through the straw. Sipahh straws are used like a normal straw. First launched in Australia, the Sipahh straw is now available in 44 countries across 5 continents. The straws have a range of flavours including chocolate, banana, caramel, strawberry, vanilla, cookies & cream, honeycomb and choc-mint. The straws are often available at school canteens and are popular with children.

Sipahh is the first commercially produced product to use the Unistraw Delivery System (UDS). In response to growing public concern about plastic pollution, new biodegradable straws were launched in 2019.

== Mai'a Iced Coffee Straws ==
Unistraw International Limited's second product release, Mai'a Iced Coffee Straws, were released commercially in Australia in October 2006. Mai'a Iced Coffee Straws are designed to flavour a 250mL/ 8.5oz glass of cold milk, and are pitched to young adults as a healthier alternative to other iced coffee drinks. They are available in three flavours: Espresso, Mocha, and Cappuccino.

== See also ==
- List of brand name snack foods
