= Milo Cress =

American environmental activist (born 2001)

- Born: 2001 (age 23–24)
- Occupations: Student; Environmental activist
- Years active: 2011–present

Milo Cress (born 2001) is the founder and spokesperson for the Be Straw Free campaign, which partners with Eco-Cycle.

== Activism ==
Milo Cress founded the Be Straw Free campaign in 2011 at the age of nine. The campaign advocates for restaurants and other venues to reduce their use of disposable straws. At the age of nine, Cress conducted research by surveying straw manufacturers, estimating that Americans use 500 million straws daily. This figure has been widely criticized by major news organizations. Cress has garnered a significant following in South Korea. He has traveled globally, delivering presentations to various organizations about his "offer first" concept and advocating for children to engage in activism in their own capacities. In 2014, he was recognized as a finalist for the Gloria Barron Prize for Young Heroes.
