= Grande Riviere =

Coordinates: 10°50′N 61°03′W

- Village
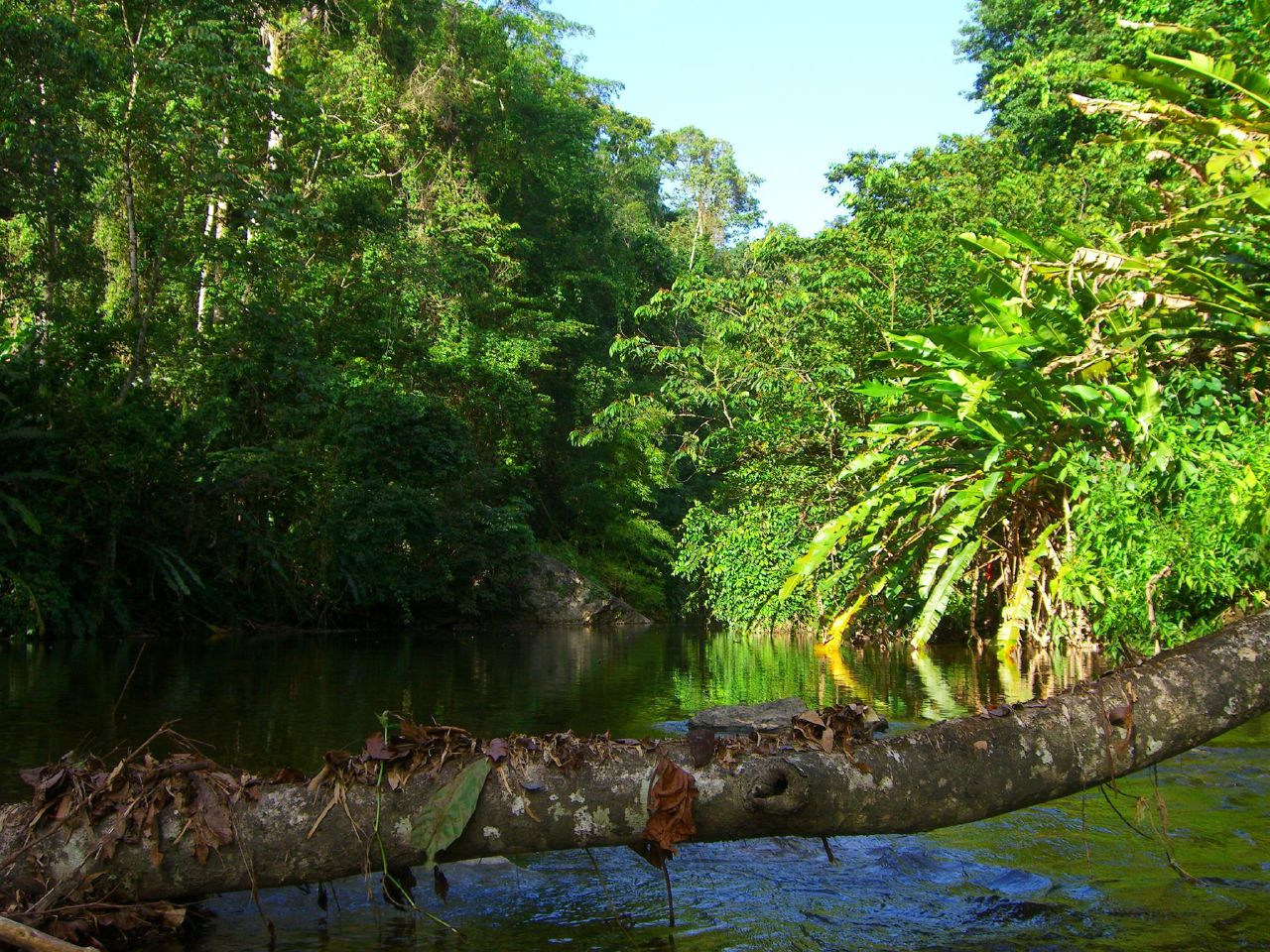
- Grande Riviere River
- Interactive map of Grande Riviere
- Country: Trinidad and Tobago
- Region: Sangre Grande
- County: St. David

Population (2000)
  - Total: 334

Grande Riviere is a village on the north coast of Trinidad located between Toco and Matelot. The area was originally settled by immigrants from Venezuela and Tobago who cultivated cacao and subsistence crops. After falling cocoa prices in the 1920s and expanding pest problems caused the collapse of the cocoa industry, Grande Riviere went into a decline which continued until the development of ecotourism. Between 1931 and 2000 the population of Grande Riviere fell from 718 to 334.

Grande Riviere is one of the more remote settlement in Trinidad and Tobago. It is 60 kilometres from Sangre Grande and 100 km from the capital Port of Spain. It is accessible via a single paved road which runs from Toco to its east and is separated from the rest of the island by the hills of the Northern Range.

== History ==
Grande Riviere was initially settled by immigrants from Venezuela in the 1860s. They planted cacao as a cash crop, together with various subsistence crops. They were joined by immigrants from Tobago only 35 km to the northeast. This was the beginning of the cocoa boom in Trinidad which lasted from 1866 to 1920. Economic life was dominated by the 650-acre (2.6 km^{2}) Grande Riviere estate, a cocoa plantation which was the major employer in the area. In addition to working as wage labourers on the estate, villagers also grew cocoa on small holdings which was either sold to the estate or to outside buyers.

International cocoa markets suffered with the disruption of shipping associated with World War I, but recovered after the end of the war. A glut in production led to a collapse in the price in 1921. This was followed by the broader economic collapse caused by the Great Depression, and the outbreak of witch's broom. Coupled with higher prices for sugar (the other dominant crop in Trinidad and Tobago) and the rise of the petroleum industry, this led to a long gradual decline in cocoa production. As the cocoa industry collapsed, Grande Riviere went into decline. The population of the village declined from 718 in 1931 to 550 in 1946. The Masonic Lodge and police station were relocated out of the village, the magistrates' court ceased to visit the village, and Grande Riviere estate was sold. The new owner, while maintaining cocoa production, cut staff to a minimum.

This decline continued through most of the remainder of the twentieth century. The economy was dominated by agriculture - cocoa and bananas were grown as cash crops, artisanal fishing and road construction and maintenance work by the government. Subsistence agriculture, hunting and the capture of nesting Leatherback turtles also contributed food and income.

== Ecotourism ==
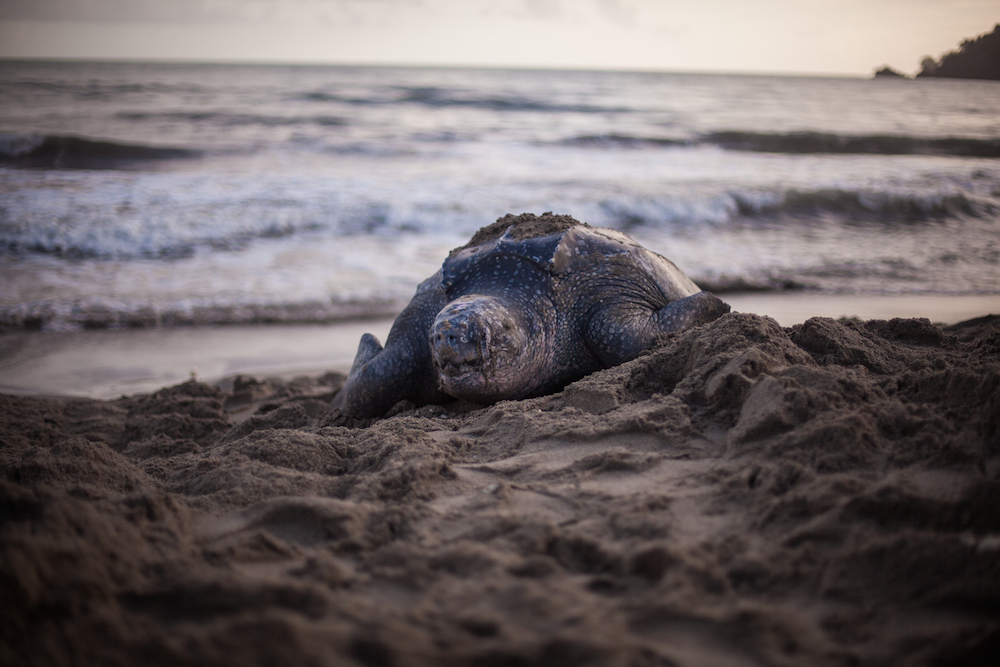
A leatherback turtle nesting on a beach in Grande Riviere.

In 1992, following the success of Nature Seekers in Matura, the Grande Riviere Environmental Awareness Trust (GREAT) was established with the aim of protecting nesting Leatherback turtles on Grande Riviere beach. The following year Italian photographer Piero Guerrini rented the former cocoa estate headquarters and converted it into a 12-room beach front hotel, Mt. Plasir. The hotel was very successful and was eventually joined by three other hotels - Le Grande Almandier hotel, a 10-room hotel, McEachnie’s Haven, a six-room hotel, and Acajou, a 7-room ecological boutique-hotel. In addition, villagers started renting rooms to visitors.

GREAT began training tour guides, but a subsequent split led to the formation of Grande Riviere Nature Tour Guides Association (GRNTGA) which focussed more on tour guides, while the remainder of GREAT focussed on protection of turtle hatchlings. In addition to sea turtles, there is an interest in nature tourism more broadly, including the critically endangered pawi (Trinidad piping-guan, the only bird species endemic to Trinidad).
