= Asociación Salvemos las Tortugas de Parismina =

Costa Rican non-profit organization

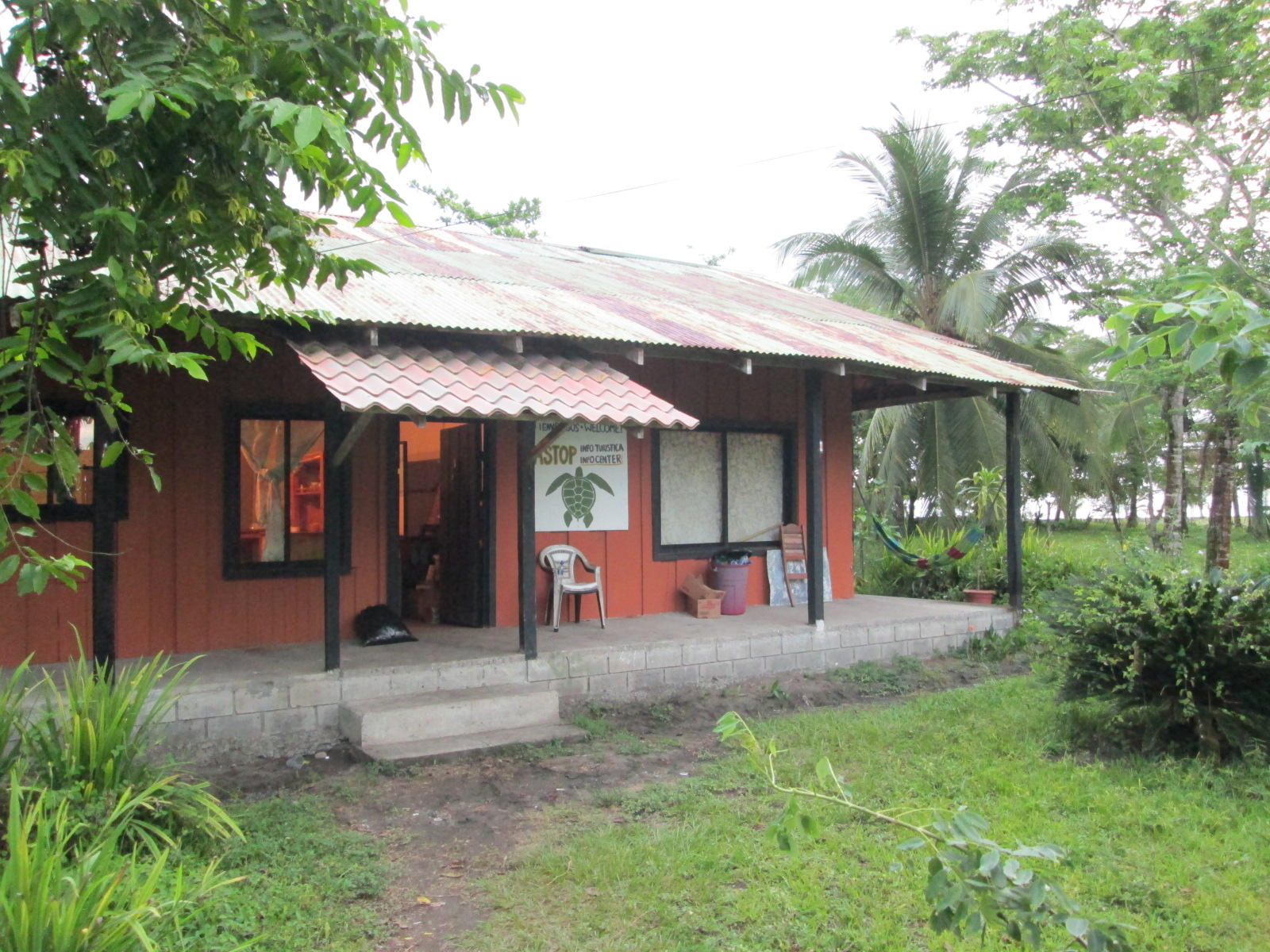
The headquarters of ASTOP in Barra del Parismina, Costa Rica

Asociación Salvemos las Tortugas de Parismina (Spanish) (English: Association for Saving the Turtles of Parismina or ASTOP) is a community-based, non-profit conservation organization based in Parismina, Costa Rica, dedicated to protecting sea turtles and their eggs from poaching while initiating sustainable development and providing a viable alternative economy to poaching in the village.

While the turtles used to be hunted as a food source by inhabitants, a recent increase in poaching has been seriously threatening the population. In April 2001, local residents and the Costa Rican Coast Guard initiated ASTOP. Prior to the formation of ASTOP, 98% of the green turtles were killed for their meat and 98% of all three species of turtles' nests were poached on Parismina beach. Since the project started, poaching has decreased to 38%. In addition to saving 10,000 neonates annually, ASTOP economically supports approximately one-third of the village.

== Sea turtles ==
Four species of sea turtles nest on the beaches at Parismina, each during its own season. Several of these are hovering on the brink of extinction, particularly the leatherback sea turtle. While it is mostly leatherbacks and green sea turtles who nest in the black sand dunes of the beaches near Parismina; hawksbill turtles are occasionally found and loggerheads have been reported, but are rarely seen.

Because of their nutritional value and their supposedly aphrodisiac properties, it is mostly the sea turtles eggs that the poachers seek. However the green sea turtle is also hunted for her meat and shell, with which tortoiseshell objects can be crafted.

== Conservation ==
The core of the work done by the association is done at night during patrols, when team of volunteers and guides walk the 6 kilometres (3.7 mi) beach. Upon encountering a nesting turtle, the team guards the surroundings to collect her eggs and fend off poachers. The eggs are then brought back to a guarded hatchery, where they undergo their normal development cycle. After hatching, the newborns are collected and released at different locations along the beach during a patrol similar to that which collected them several weeks before.
