= Parismina Airport =

- IATA: none; ICAO: MRBP

Summary
- Airport type: Public
- Operator: Directorate General of Civil Aviation of Costa Rica
- Location: Parismina, Costa Rica
- Elevation AMSL: 2 m / 7 ft
- Coordinates: 10°18′09″N 083°20′45″W

Map
- Location in Costa Rica

Runways
Direction	Length		Surface
Direction	m	ft	Surface
14/32	900	2,953	concrete

Statistics (2014)
- Passengers: 712
- Passenger change 13–14: ▲8.2%
- Source: Directorate General of Civil Aviation of Costa Rica.

Parismina Airport (ICAO: MRBP) is an airport that serves Parismina, a coastal town in Siquirres Canton, Limón Province, Costa Rica. In some cases the airport is also referred as Barra de Parismina Airport.

Parismina Airport has a concrete airstrip of 900 m and very few basic facilities for passengers, although the airport is in downtown Parismina, next to the village's cemetery. The airport is owned and managed by the country's Directorate General of Civil Aviation.

Currently, there are no scheduled domestic services to Parismina airport, but the airfield is constantly served by charter services.

== Passenger Statistics ==
These data show number of passengers movements into the airport, according to the Directorate General of Civil Aviation of Costa Rica's Statistical Yearbooks.

Year	2008	2009	2010	2011	2012	2013	2014	2015
Passengers	2,370	2,427	1,389	1,133	690	658	712	T.B.A.
Growth (%)	▼35.96%	▲2.41%	▼42.77%	▼18.43%	▼39.10%	▼4.64%	▲8.21%	T.B.A.
Source: Costa Rica's Directorate General of Civil Aviation (DGAC). Statistical Yearbooks (Years 2008, 2009, 2010, 2011, 2012, 2013, and 2014)

Year	2000	2001	2002	2003	2004	2005	2006	2007
Passengers	800	390	190	404	547	2,239	4,253	3,701
Growth (%)	N.A.	▼51.25%	▼51.28%	▲112.63%	▲35.40%	▲309.32%	▲89.85%	▼12.98%
Source: Costa Rica's Directorate General of Civil Aviation (DGAC). Statistical Yearbooks (Years 2000-2005, 2006, and 2007,)
