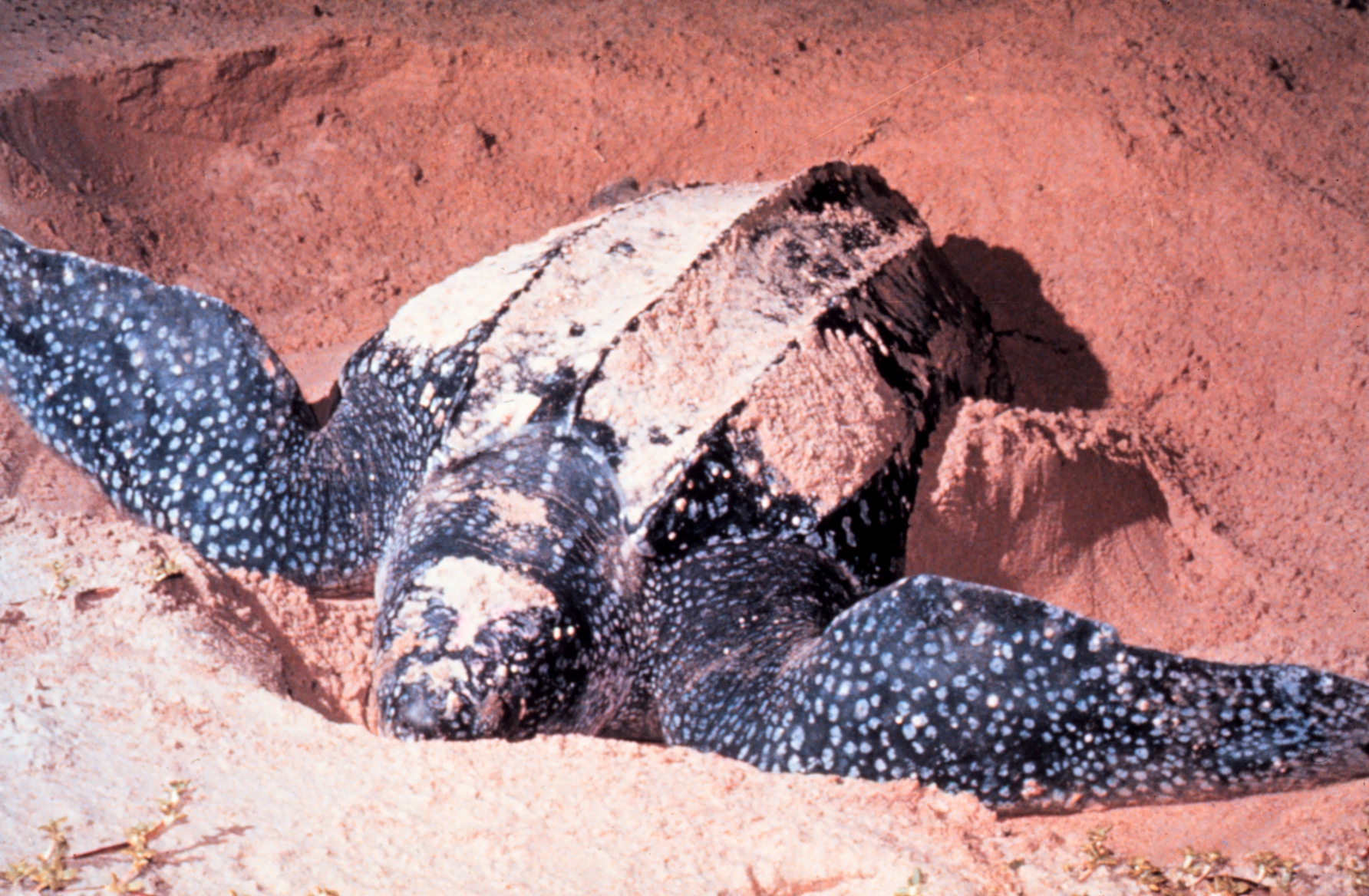
- Leatherback sea turtle, a species of the family Dermochelyidae

Scientific classification
- Domain: Eukaryota
- Kingdom: Animalia
- Phylum: Chordata
- Class: Reptilia
- Order: Testudines
- Suborder: Cryptodira
- Superfamily: Chelonioidea
- Clade: Dermochelyoidae
- Clade: Pandermochelys; Joyce et al., 2004

Subgroups
- Dermochelyidae; †Protostegidae

= Pandermochelys =

Pandermochelys Temporal range: Early Cretaceous-Holocene, 110–0 Ma

Clade of turtles

Pandermochelys is a clade of sea turtles belonging to the superfamily Chelonioidea. It is defined as all turtles more closely related to leatherback sea turtles than to cheloniids (green sea turtles and relatives). It includes the largest living turtles, the leatherback sea turtle, as well as the largest sea turtles of all time, Archelon.
