= Salines de Montjoly =

Salt works and protected area in French Guiana

- IUCN category IV (habitat/species management area)
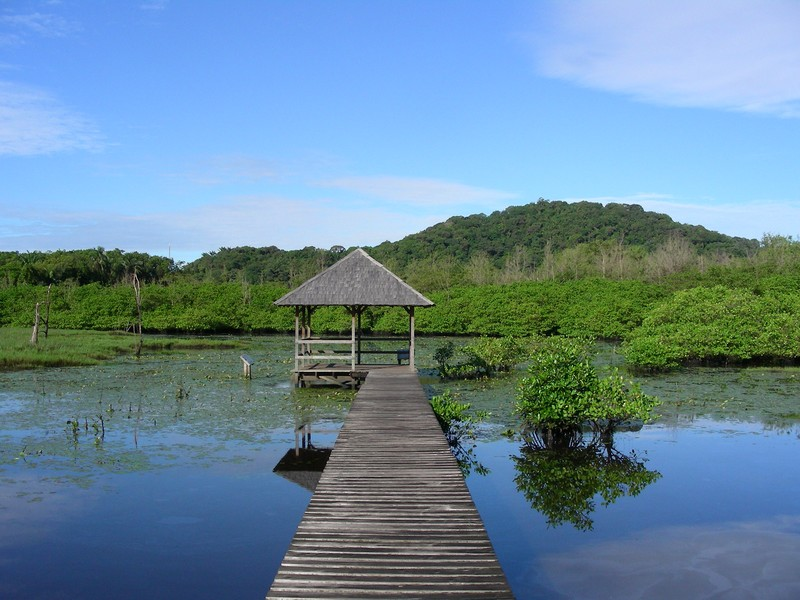
- Observation pontoon

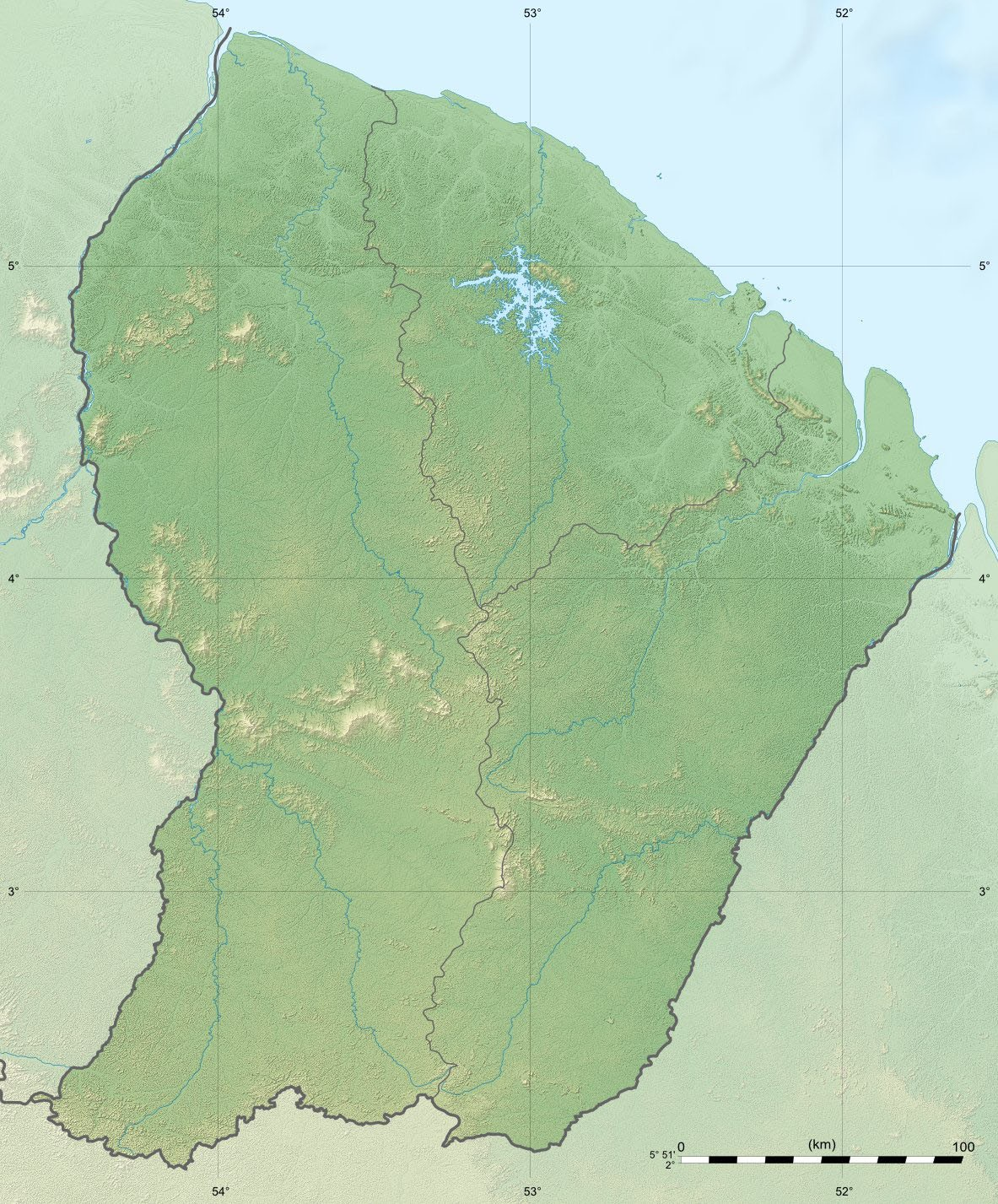
- Location within French Guiana
- Location: French Guiana, France
- Nearest city: Remire-Montjoly
- Coordinates: 4.92367°N 52.27478°W
- Area: 0.64 km^{2} (0.25 sq mi) (Note: According INPN and Protected Planet, the protected area measures 64 hectares, however Conservatoire du littoral says 63.)
- Established: 14 February 1985
- Governing body: Conservatoire du littoral

Salines de Montjoly is a former saltworks and protected area in the commune of Remire-Montjoly in French Guiana, France. It is located in the urban area on the Atlantic Ocean, and contains a multitude of biomes. The beach is used by sea turtles for nesting, the dune ridge contains desert vegetation, the wetlands are a refuge for migratory birds, and it contains the only publicly accessible mangrove forest of French Guiana.

== Overview ==
Salines de Montjoly was in use as a salt evaporation pond, a shallow area where the water of the Atlantic Ocean evaporates leaving salt to be harvested. It is a natural pond, and not a man-made salt works.

The beach is 1,200 metres long and is used by three species of sea turtles for nesting: the leatherback sea turtle, the olive ridley sea turtle and the green sea turtle. The presence of a fresh water wetland behind the beach is rare, and attracts migratory birds which include muscovy ducks and blue-winged teals. The area is also home to amphibians and reptiles. Giant otters have become a recent addition.

In 1985, Salines de Montjoly became a protected area and is administered by Conservatoire du littoral. Since then strong tides have caused damage to the area, and as of 2020, certain parts have been closed to the public pending restoration. Salines de Montjoly is located 10 kilometres (6.2 mi) from the capital Cayenne, and has a publicly accessible observation platform on the lagoon and several paths through the mangrove forests.
