= Parismina =

Barra del Parismina
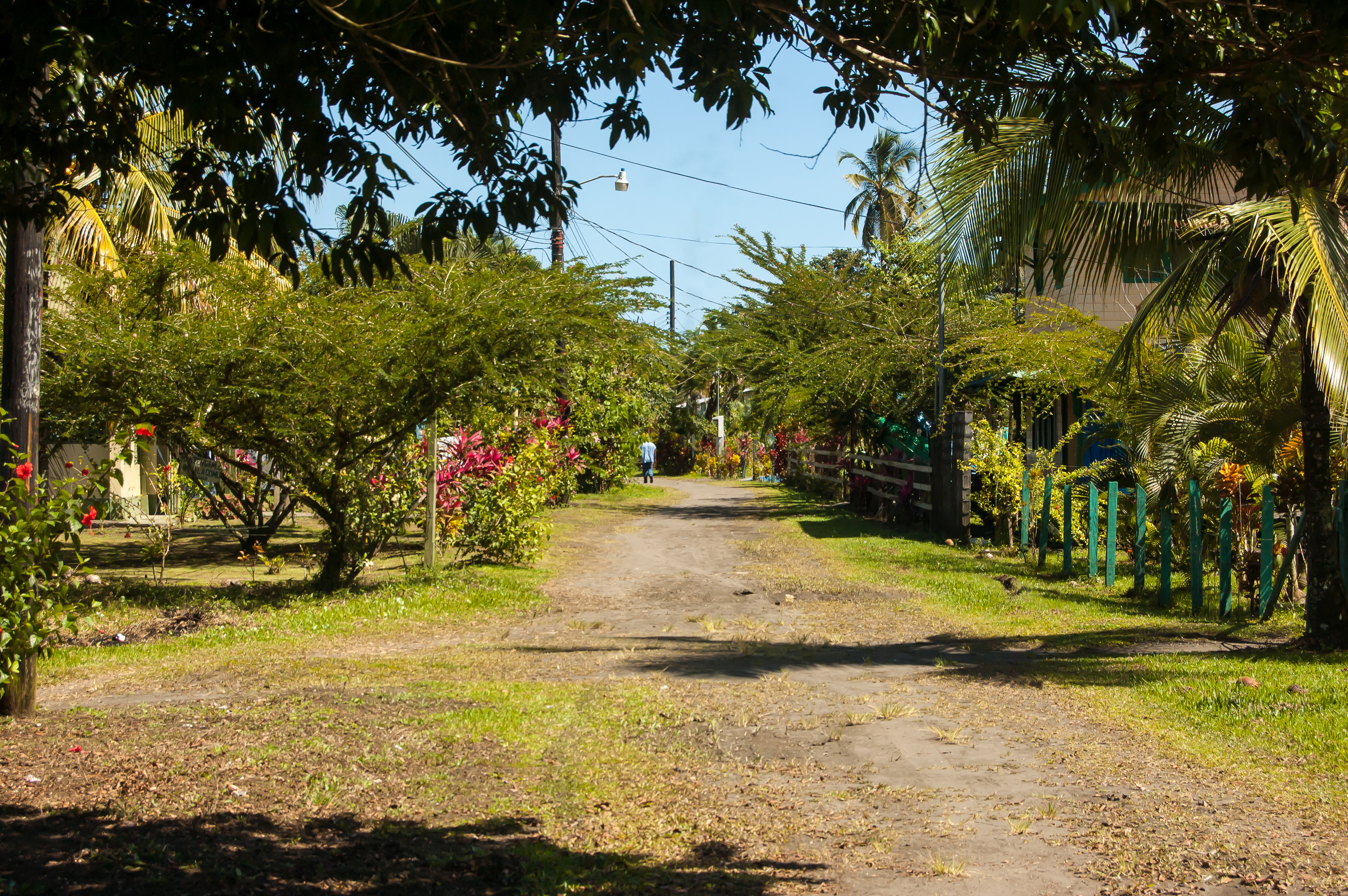
- Parismina main street

- Location within Costa Rica
- Coordinates: 10°18′23″N 83°21′12″W
- Country: Costa Rica
- Province: Limón Province
- Canton: Siquirres Canton
- District: Siquirres District
- Elevation: 0 m (0 ft)

Population
  - Total: 400
- Time zone: UTC-6 (Central Standard Time)
- Postal Code: 70301
- Area code: + 506
- Website: www.parismina.com

Barra del Parismina is a village of about 500 people located on the Caribbean coast of Costa Rica, at the mouth of the Reventazón River. Parismina is about halfway between Tortuguero and Limón on the Tortuguero canals. There is no road to Parismina; it is accessible only by boat or plane and while some cars and motorcycles exist within the village, the paved surface is the runway. Parismina is part of the Canton of Siquirres in the Limón Province. Eco-tourism and sport fishing are the foundation of the village economy.

The residents of Parismina have a unique culture which includes a local dialect, many Caribbean traditions and cuisine, and a traditional Rastafarian influence.

The community hosts an annual festival that takes place next to the soccer field, in the main communal area of the town.

== Facilities ==
At least three whole guest houses/hotels and a few restaurants and bars are available in the town of Parismina. A number of high end fishing lodges specializing in tarpon and snook are located short boat rides away and provide the villagers with their main source of income. Residents benefit from a health care center which operates two days a week, a police station and both a primary and secondary education schools.

Parismina enjoys a public water system with safe drinking water and sanitation. Most houses have electricity installed and most streets have lights. No banks or post office are to be found in the village. As such, residents and tourists alike make the trip to Siquirres occasionally to carry out administrative and financial duties.

The town has 4 stores, known as pulperias, or small grocery or general stores. They have basic necessities and a small selection of groceries. There are also multiple sodas, or small cafes.

The city has an elementary school and a new combined middle and high school that was recently funded by the government. There is a communal soccer field and volleyball court, where many of the kids hang out every day after school.

== Sea turtles ==
Four species of sea turtles nest on the beaches at Parismina. Several of these are hovering on the brink of extinction, particularly the leatherback sea turtle. A large number of leatherbacks and green sea turtles nest in the black sand dunes of the beaches near Parismina; hawksbill turtles are occasionally found and loggerheads have been reported, but are rarely seen.

While the turtles used to be hunted as a food source by inhabitants, a recent increase in poaching has been seriously threatening the population. In April 2001, local residents along with the Costa Rican Coast Guard, initiated Asociación Salvemos las Tortugas de Parismina, or Save the Turtles of Parismina (ASTOP). A community-based, non profit, conservation organization dedicated to protecting sea turtles and their eggs from poaching while initiating sustainable development and providing a viable alternative economy to poaching in the village.

Prior to the formation of ASTOP, 98% of the green turtles were killed for their meat and 98% of all three species of turtles' nests were poached on Parismina beach. Since the project started, poaching has decreased to 38%. In addition to saving 10,000 neonates annually, ASTOP economically supports approximately one third of the village.

== Gallery ==
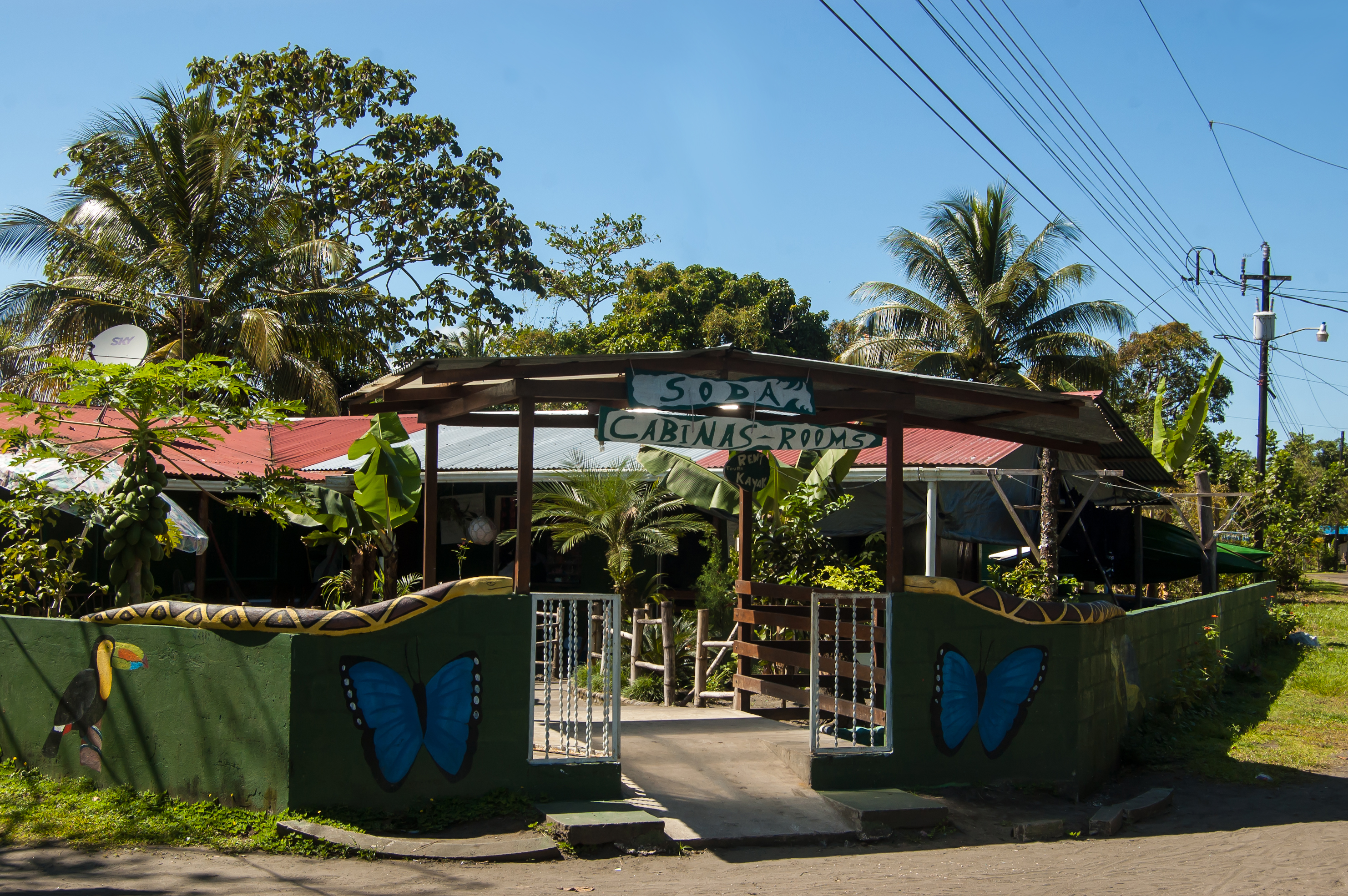
Soda cabinas - rooms

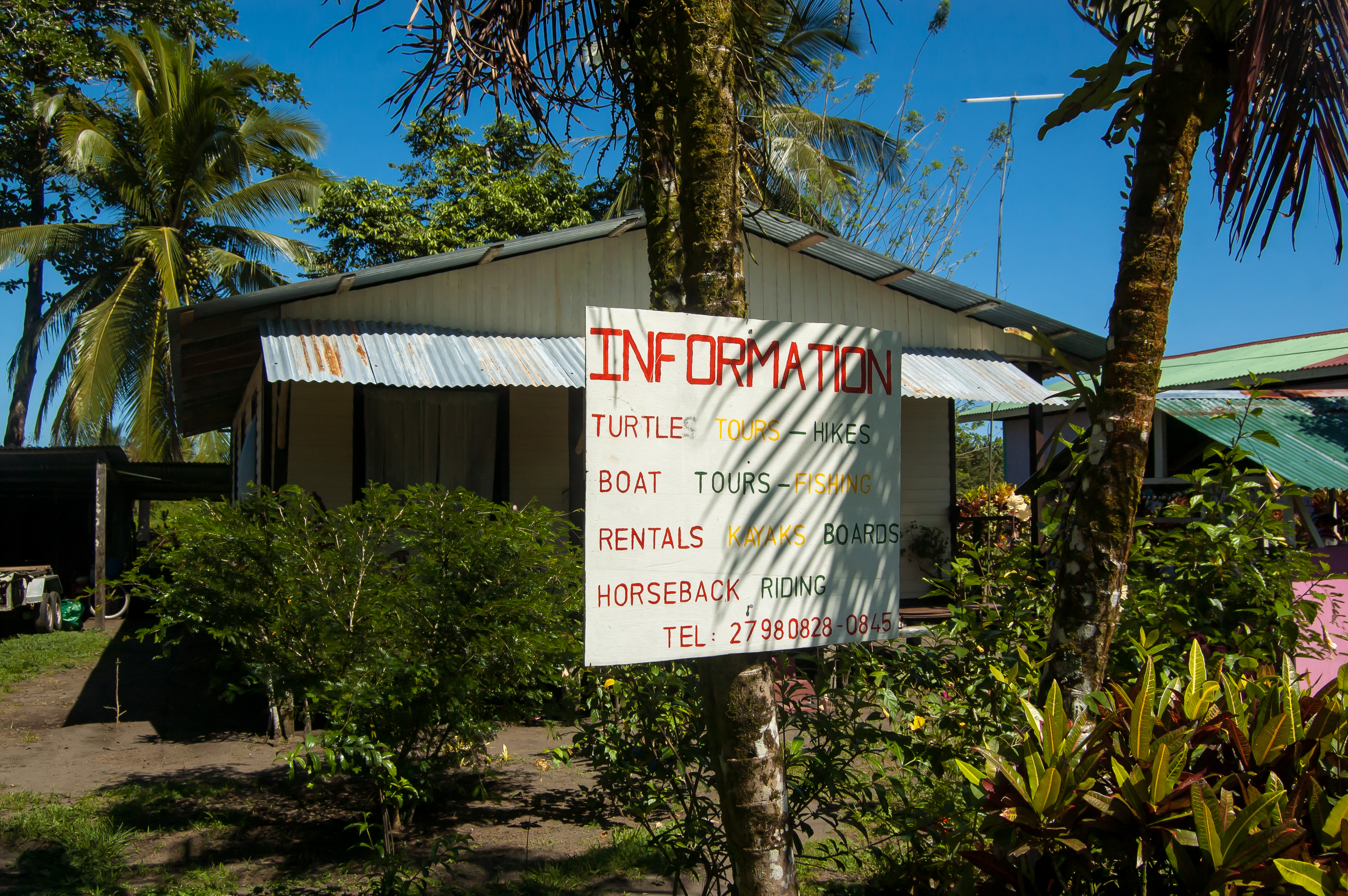
Information stand

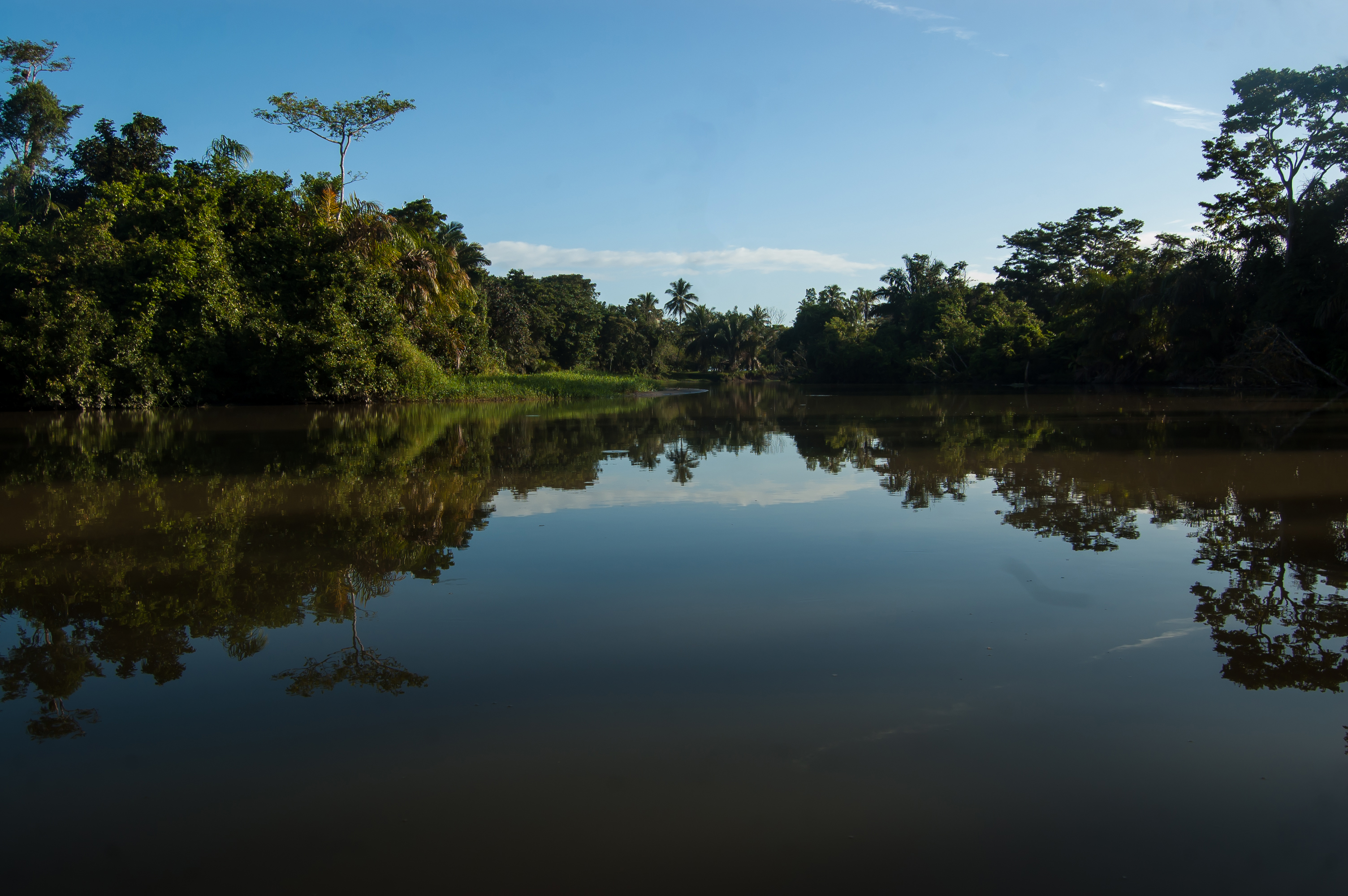
Reventazón River

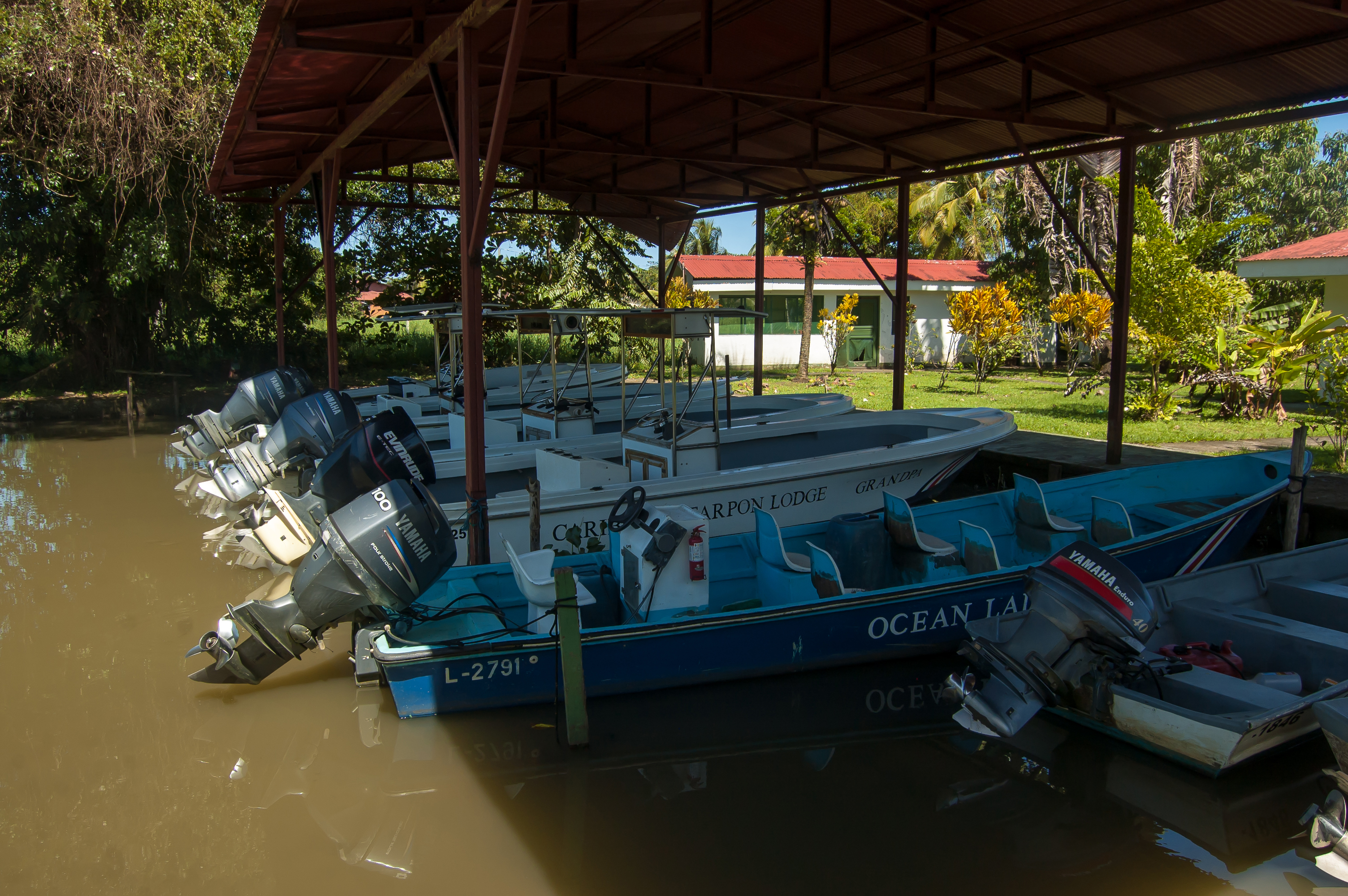
Parismina pier

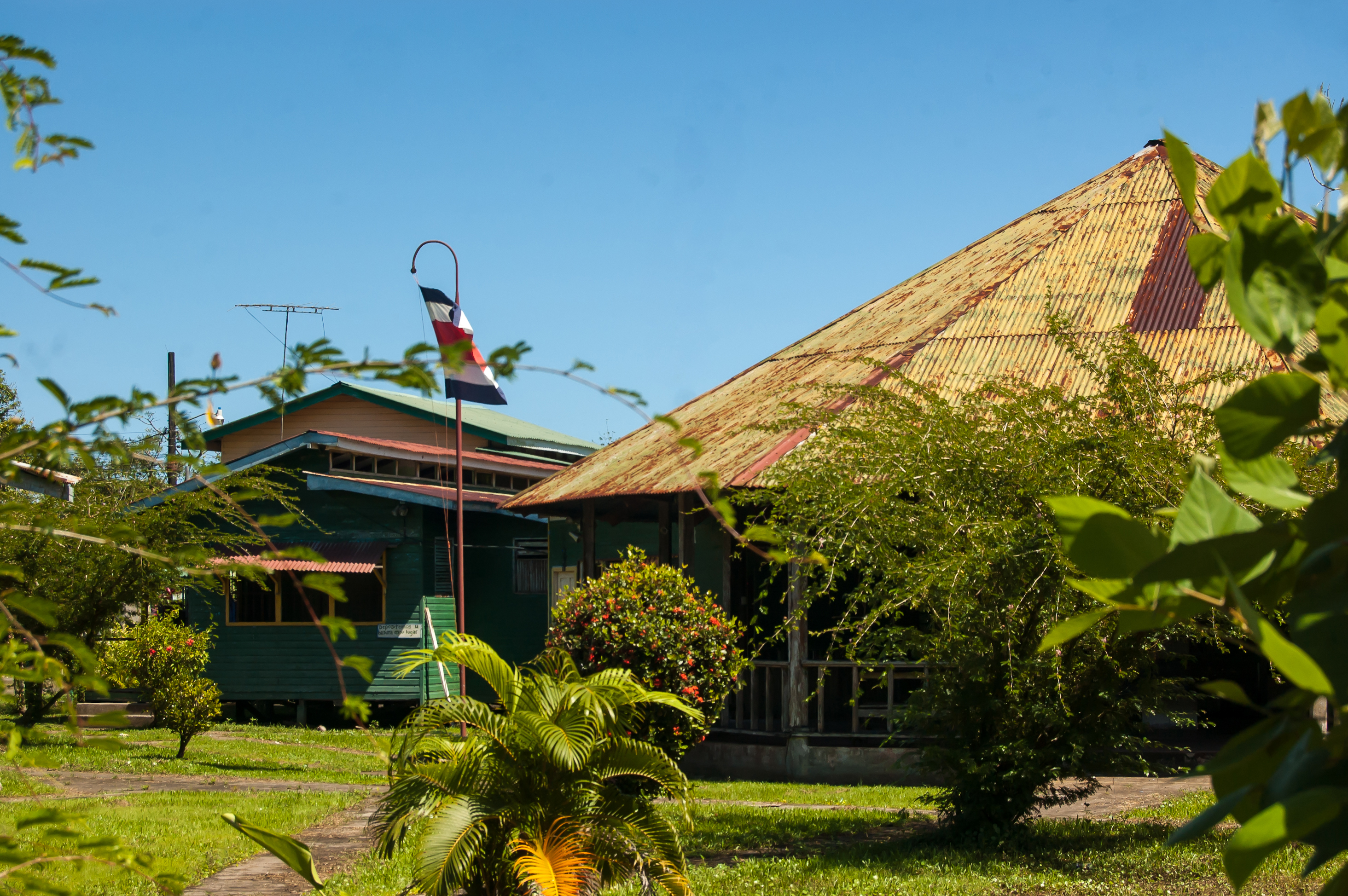
Parismina houses
