= Nature Seekers =

Nature Seekers is a community-based organization founded in 1990 with the aim of protecting nesting leatherback turtles in Trinidad and Tobago. The ultimate goal of the group was to reduce the problem of poaching which stood at 30 percent on a nightly basis. Through the efforts of tour guide services to visitors on Matura Beach, tagging of turtles, and patrolling the group has been able to reduce the percentage of poaching from 30 percent to zero. Now the group has expanded to include reforestation, waste recycling and natural jewelry with its core still being turtle conservation.

== Foundation ==
Prior to the foundation of Nature Seekers, the killing of female leatherback turtles by poachers had become such a serious problem that in 1990 Matura Beach was declared a Prohibited Area under the Forest Act. In order to find a long-term solution to this problem, the Wildlife Section of the Forestry Division worked together with the Matura community to establish a tour guide training program. The intent of this program was to educate the community about the need to protect the environment, and it was from this program that Nature Seekers was formed. Although initially Nature Seekers operated purely on a volunteer basis, and had great difficulty in obtaining funds, they were later commissioned by the government to patrol the beach and to provide a mandatory tour guide service to visitors. While Nature Seekers has remained a non-governmental organization, they have frequently worked in cooperation with the government to protect the leatherback turtles.

== Projects ==
The main project of Nature Seekers is the Matura Turtle Conservation Programme, which is also their first project that was begun with the foundation of the organization. This project consists of several smaller programs aimed at the protection of leatherback turtles in Trinidad. One of these programs involves patrolling the beach in order to protect the turtles from poachers and assist with the nesting process, as well as providing tour guide services to visitors in order to promote greater awareness of the necessity of conservation. In addition to tours of the beach, they also conduct tours of several other natural attractions in the area.

Another important project under the Matura Turtle Conservation Programme is the Pilot Sea Turtle Tagging Project, which is carried out in association with the Forestry Division, WIDECAST (Wider Caribbean Sea Turtle Network), and the Institute of Marine Affairs. This project involves tagging sea turtles to track their migration patterns and gathering data from hatched nests.

The Trinidad Leatherback Project is another part of the Matura Turtle Conservation Programme. This project involves an association with Earthwatch, which sends volunteers to help the Nature Seekers as a form of volunteer travel. In addition to providing volunteers and funding for Nature Seekers, this project also helps create more global awareness of the endangered status of the leatherback turtles.

The Matura Turtle Conservation Programme also consists of an annual effort to clean up Matura Beach and a study of methods of reducing the impact of tourism on turtles and their nests. Both are part of an effort by Nature Seekers to make Matura Beach a suitable place for both the turtle and the visitors. They also run an Adopt a Turtle program, which provides funds for other projects and educates participants about the turtles they adopt.

Besides the Matura Turtle Conservation Programme, Nature Seekers also participate in the National Reforestation and Watershed Rehabilitation Programme. The organization manages one of 55 projects in Trinidad as part of this program, which involves reforestation and the development of ecotourism activities that have a low impact on the environment.

== Impact ==
At first, there was much opposition in the Matura community towards the new conservation efforts. Many people made a living off of turtle meat and eggs, and were worried that the restrictions of the beach would interfere with their ability to survive. Even more resented the beach being closed off during nesting season, as many locals used the beach for recreation. However, over time, Nature Seekers has had a positive effect on the community. In addition to creating jobs within the organization, the increased tourism brought to Matura by Nature Seekers created a strong tourism industry in the village, with many villagers operating bed and breakfasts and other tourism-related businesses. Nature Seekers has also been successful in generating community awareness about the importance of conservation. Even some poachers and their families became convinced of the importance of conservation, and some even joined the Nature Seekers. Through this and their patrolling efforts, Nature Seekers claims to have brought down the rate of turtles being slaughtered from 30% to zero. Because of the effectiveness of the conservation efforts, Nature Seekers has become a model for similar programs in other parts of Trinidad.

== Turtle Village Trust ==
In 2006, Nature Seekers joined other community organizations as well as the Forestry Division and BHP Billiton Trinidad & Tobago to form an organization called Turtle Village Trust. The stated goal of the organization is to establish Trinidad and Tobago as “the Premier Turtle Tourism Destination.” It plans to accomplish this goal by assisting in the formation of partnerships between conservation groups and local communities, the like of which was responsible for the success of Nature Seekers in the Matura community.

== Awards ==
Nature Seekers has received numerous awards for their efforts in conservation and protecting Trinidad's leatherback turtles. Some of these awards include the Conservation Award from the Caribbean Conservation Association, two Certificates of Appreciation from the Environmental Management Authority, the British Airways Tourism For Tomorrow Award, the Goldsborough Environmental Award, the First Product Innovation & Sustainability Award from the Caribbean Tourism Organization, the Award of Merit Gold from the President of Trinidad and Tobago, and the Green Apple International Award from the Green Organisation. Nature Seekers manager Dennis Sammy also received the President's Hummingbird Award for conservation, which is a great honor in Trinidad and Tobago. In addition, the group was also the recipient of a $62,000 grant from the Japanese government which will be used to expand the group's facilities.
