= List of the prehistoric life of Kansas =

This list of the prehistoric life of Kansas contains the various prehistoric life-forms whose fossilized remains have been reported from within the US state of Kansas.

== Precambrian ==
The Paleobiology Database records no known occurrences of Precambrian fossils in Kansas.

== Paleozoic ==
=== Selected Paleozoic taxa of Kansas ===
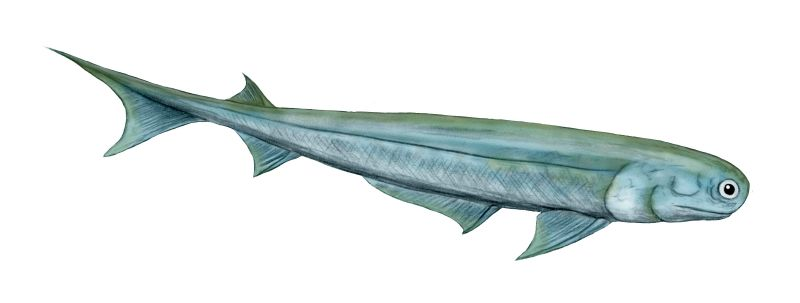
- Life restoration of the Early Devonian-Permian "spiny shark" Acanthodes
  †Acanthodes
- †Achistrum
- †Acitheca
- †Acrodus – tentative report
- †Acroplous
- †Actiobates – type locality for genus
  - †Actiobates peabodyi – type locality for species
- †Agassizodus
  - †Agassizodus variabilis
- †Aglaocrinus
- †Alethopteris
  - †Alethopteris grandini
  - †Alethopteris serlii
- Ammodiscus – tentative report
- †Amphiscapha
- † Ananias – tentative report
- †Annularia
  - †Annularia asteris
  - †Annularia mucronata
- †Aphlebia
- Archaeolithophyllum
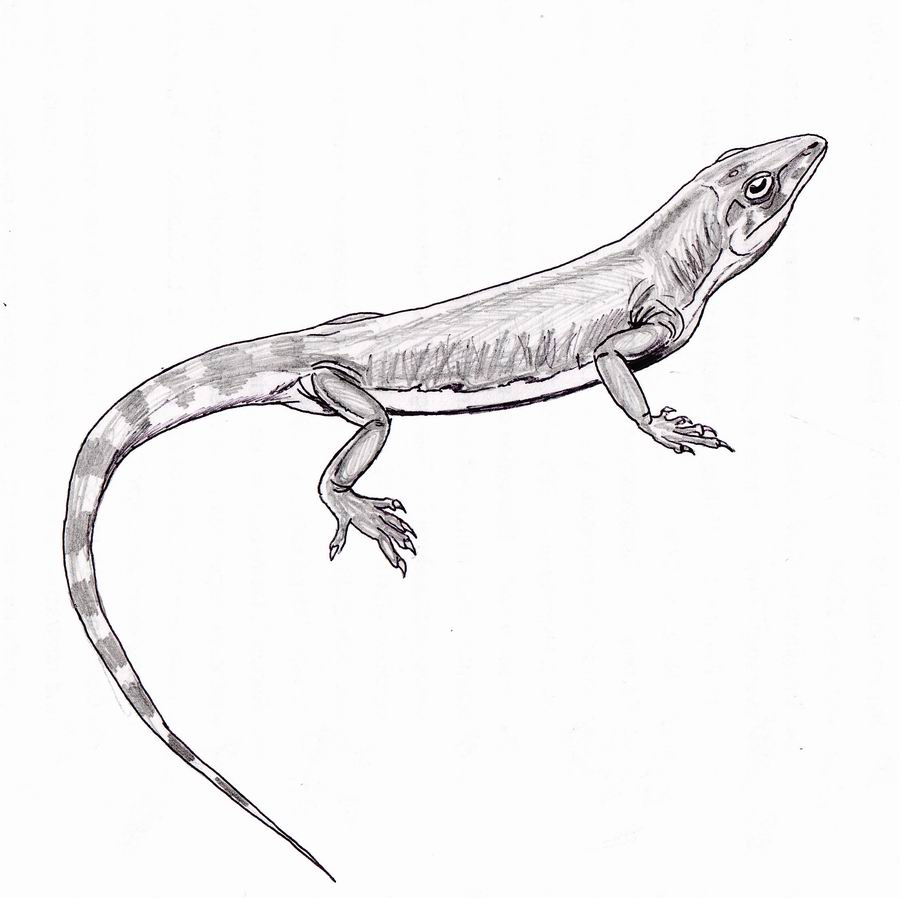
- Life restoration of the Carboniferous synapsid (mammal precursor) Archaeovenator
  †Archaeovenator – type locality for genus
  - †Archaeovenator hamiltonensis – type locality for species
- †Archimylacris
- †Aristoceras
- †Artisia
- †Asterotheca
  - †Asterotheca miltoni – or unidentified comparable form
- †Aviculopecten
  - †Aviculopecten arctisulcatus
  - †Aviculopecten mccoyi – type locality for species
  - †Aviculopecten nodocosta
  - †Aviculopecten occidentalis
  - †Aviculopecten peculiaris – type locality for species
  - †Aviculopecten sumnerensis – type locality for species
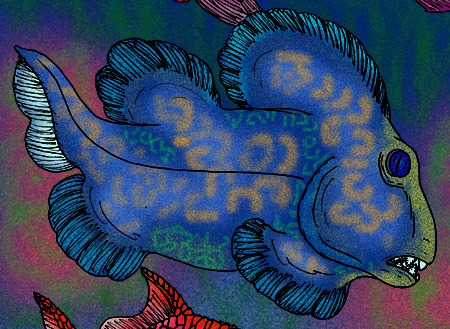
- Restoration of the Carboniferous Chimaera relative Belantsea
  †Belantsea – or unidentified comparable form
- †Bellerophon
  - †Bellerophon graphicus – type locality for species
- †Blattoidea
- †Botryococcus
  - †Botryococcus braunii
- †Calamites
  - †Calamites cistii
- †Callipteris
  - †Callipteris conferta
  - †Callipteris lyratifolia – tentative report
- †Carbonita – tentative report
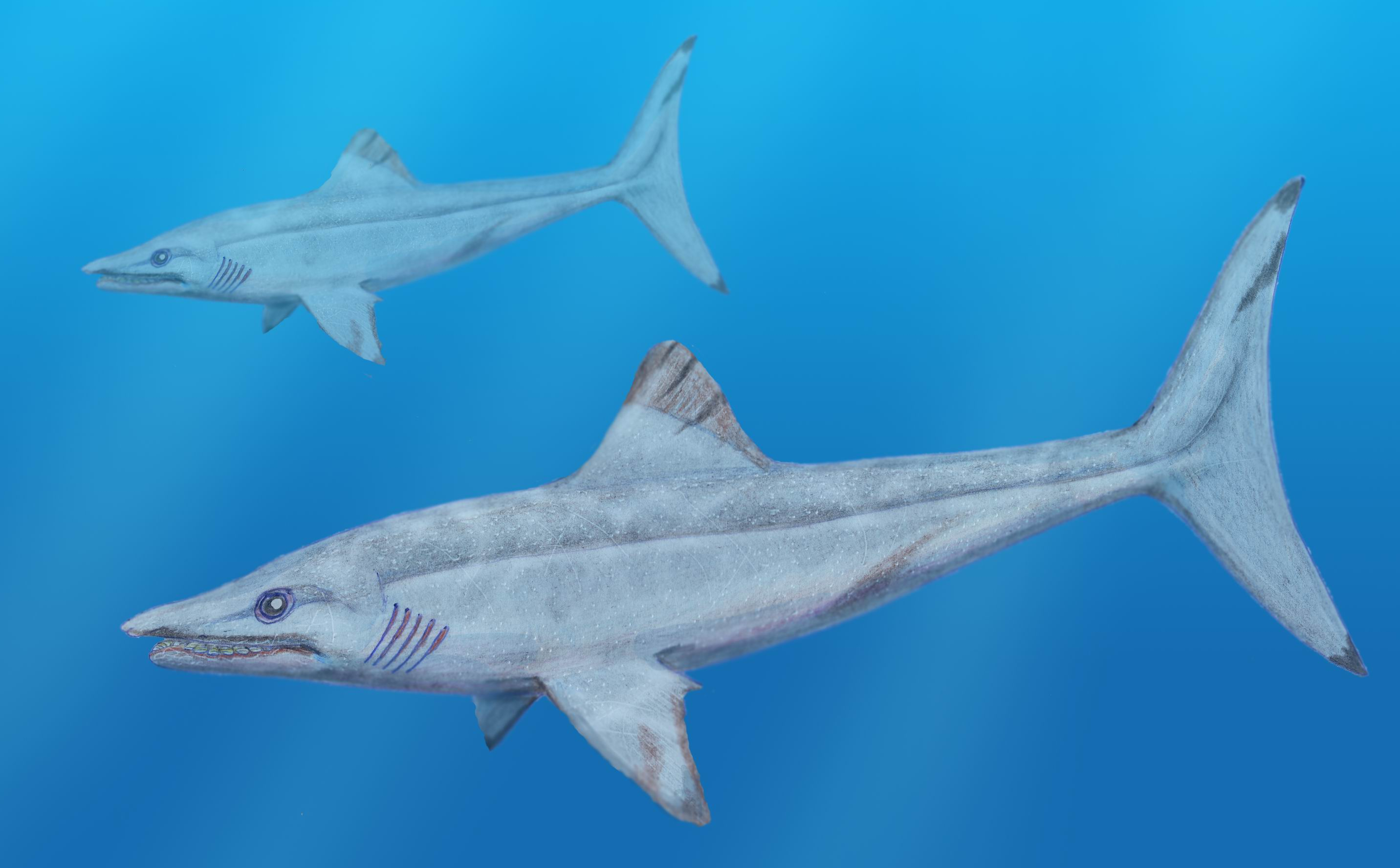
- Life restoration of the Carboniferous Chimaera relative Caseodus
  †Caseodus
  - †Caseodus eatoni
- †Chomatodus
- †Chonetes
  - †Chonetes mesoloba
- †Cladodus
- Cladophlebis
- †Cleiothyridina
  - †Cleiothyridina orbicularis
- †Composita
  - †Composita elongata
  - †Composita ovata
  - †Composita subtilita
- †Cordaicarpus
- †Cordaites
  - †Cordaites principalis
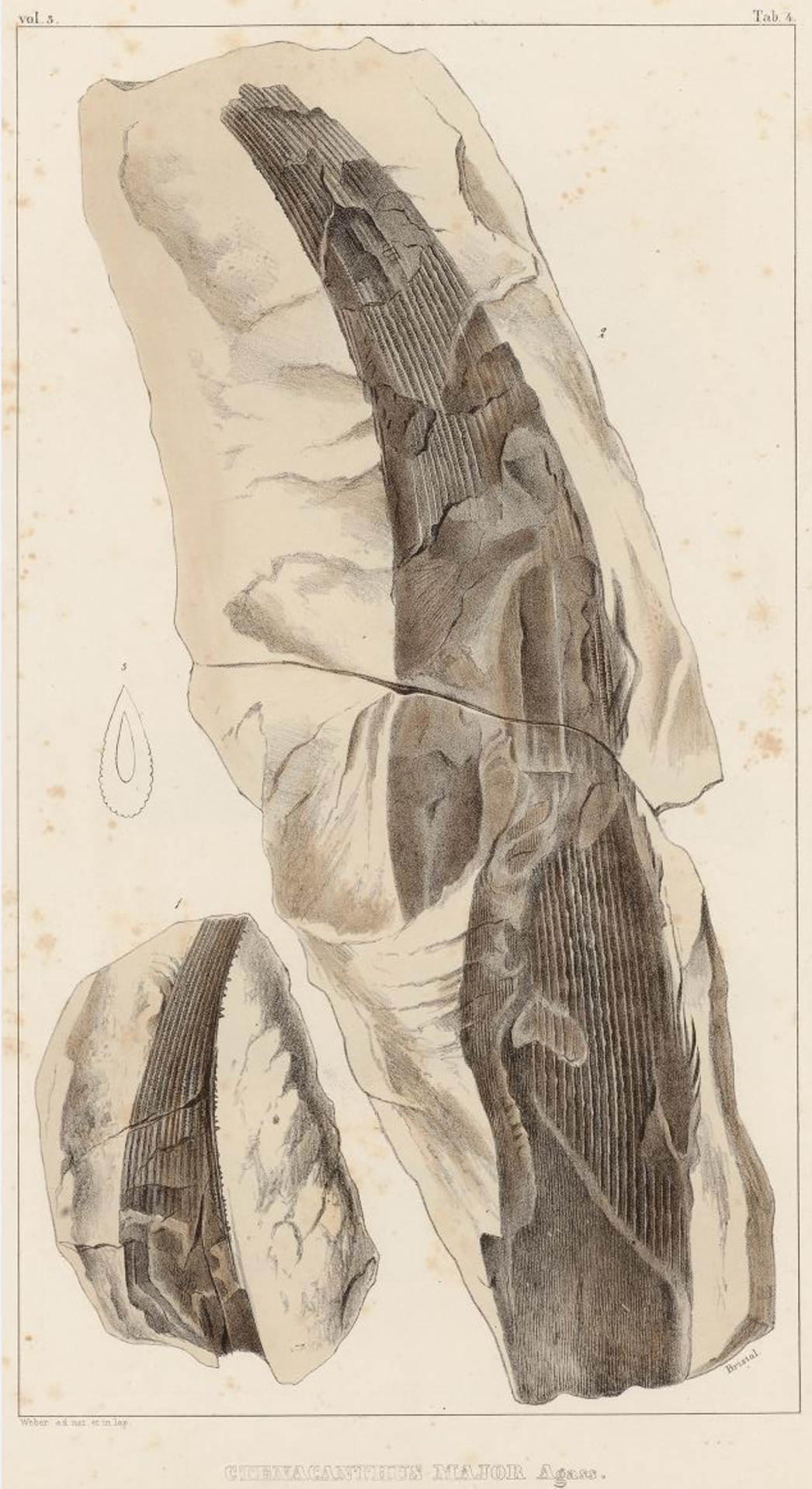
- Fossil of the Carboniferous shark Ctenacanthus
  †Ctenacanthus
  - †Ctenacanthus amblyxiphias
- †Cyathus
- †Cyclopteris
- †Cystodictya
- †Dentalium
- †Diplichnites
  - †Diplichnites gouldi
- †Ductilodon – type locality for genus
- †Dunbaria – type locality for genus
- †Echinaria
- †Edestus
  - †Edestus heinrichi – or unidentified comparable form
- †Edmondia
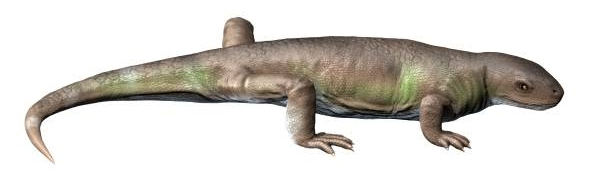
- Life restoration of the Carboniferous synapsid (mammal precursor) Eocasea
  †Eocasea – type locality for genus
  - †Eocasea martini – type locality for species
- †Eoscopus – type locality for genus
  - †Eoscopus lockardi – type locality for species
- †Euconcordia – type locality for genus
- †Fenestella
- †Fusulina
- †Geinitzina
- †Gervillia
- †Glenopteris
- †Glikmanius
  - †Glikmanius occidentalis
- †Glyptopleura
- †Gordia
- †Helminthopsis
- †Hybodus
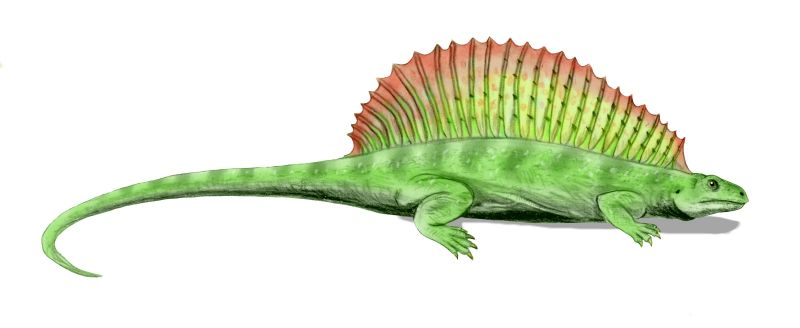
- Restoration of the Carboniferous synapsid (mammal precursor) Ianthasaurus
  †Ianthasaurus – type locality for genus
  - †Ianthasaurus hardestiorum – type locality for species
- †Ianthodon – type locality for genus
  - †Ianthodon schultzei – type locality for species
- †Isogramma
- †Janassa
- †Kawichthys – type locality for genus
  - †Kawichthys moodiei – type locality for species
- †Kennedya – type locality for genus
- †Kirkella
- †Kouphichnium
- †Lepidodendron
- †Lingula
- †Lisca – type locality for genus
- †Lissodus
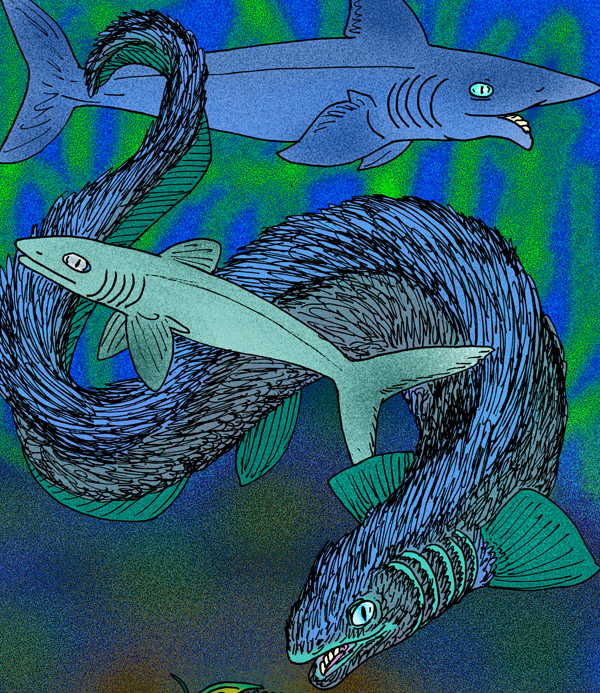
- Restoration of the Carboniferous-Early Triassic cartilaginous fish Listracanthus
  †Listracanthus
- Lithophaga
- †Lysorophus
- †Meganeuropsis – type locality for genus
  - †Meganeuropsis permiana – type locality for species
- †Megatypus – type locality for genus
- †Metacoceras
- †Minilya
- †Misthodotes – type locality for genus
- †Modiolus
- †Naticopsis
- †Neoaganides
- †Neospirifer
  - †Neospirifer cameratus
  - †Neospirifer dunbari
  - †Neospirifer kansasensis
- †Neuropteris
  - †Neuropteris auriculata – tentative report
  - †Neuropteris odontopteroides
  - †Neuropteris ovata
  - †Neuropteris scheuchzeri
- †Noeggerathia
- †Norwoodia
- Nucula
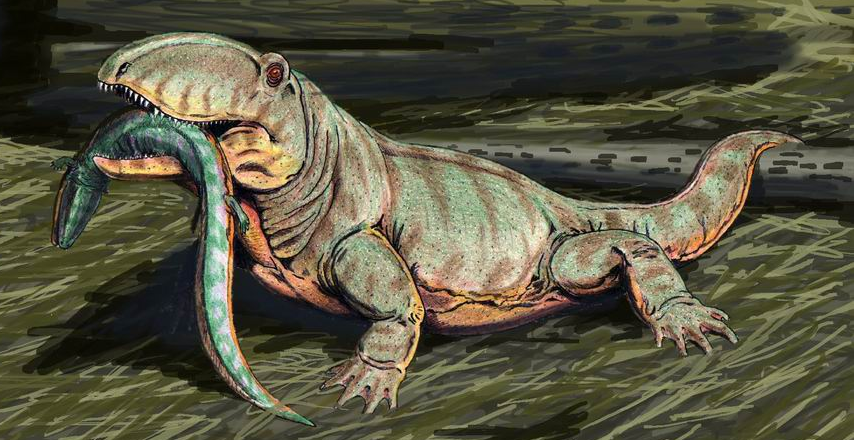
- Life restoration of the Carboniferous-Permian synapsid (mammal precursor) Ophiacodon
  †Ophiacodon – type locality for genus
  - †Ophiacodon hilli – type locality for species
- †Orodus
- †Orthacanthus
- †Palaeoniscus
- †Paleolimulus – type locality for genus
- †Pecopteris
  - †Pecopteris hemitelioides
  - †Pecopteris unita
- †Petalodus
- †Petrolacosaurus – type locality for genus
  - †Petrolacosaurus kansensis – type locality for species
- †Phillipsia – tentative report
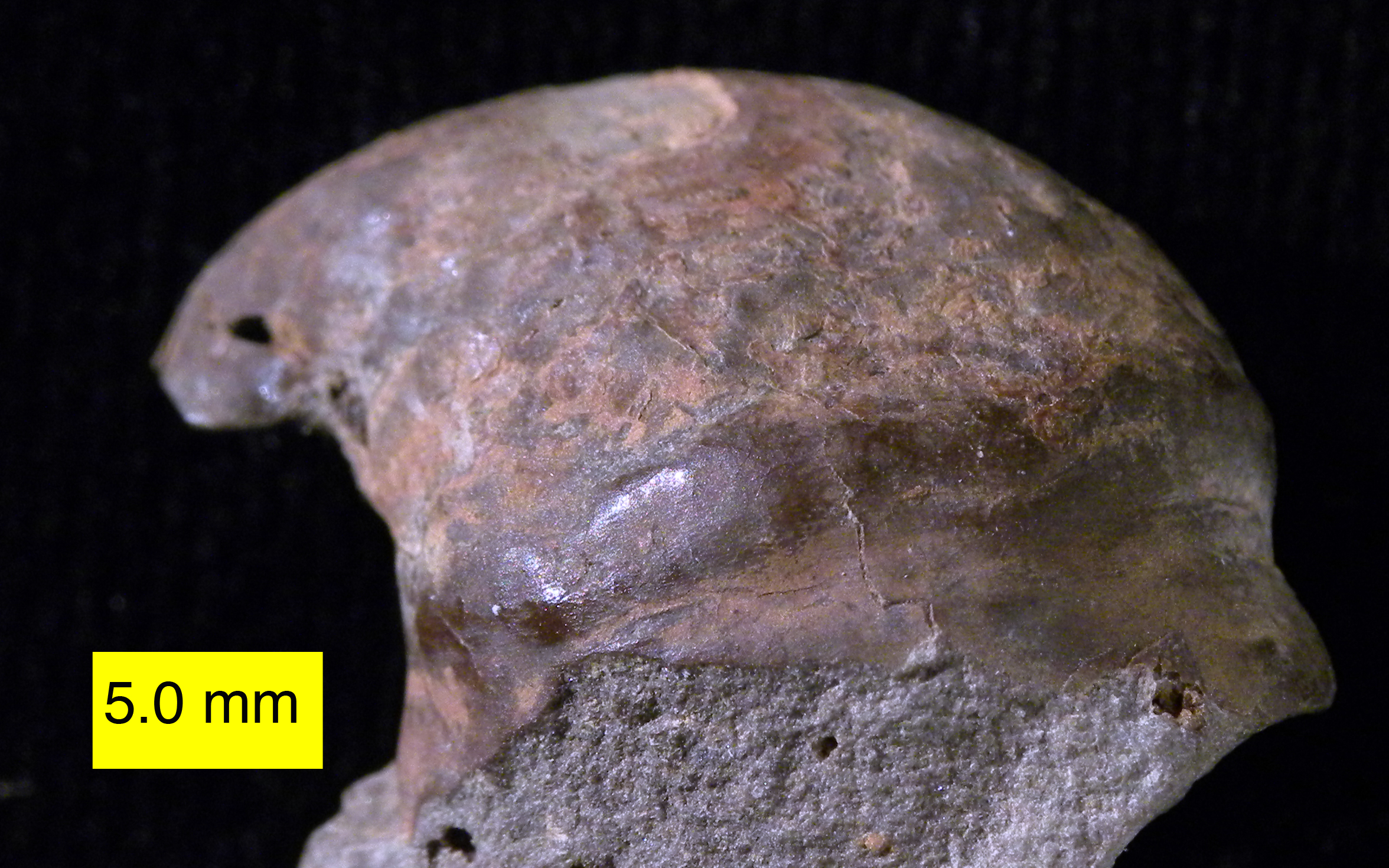
- Fossilized shell of the Silurian-Early Triassic sea snail Platyceras
  †Platyceras
- †Platysomus
- Pleurotomaria
- †Samaropsis
- †Sandalodus – or unidentified comparable form
- †Sigillaria
  - †Sigillaria brardii
- †Sphenophyllum
  - †Sphenophyllum oblongifolium
  - †Sphenophyllum stoukenbergi – or unidentified comparable form
  - †Sphenophyllum thonii – or unidentified comparable form
- †Sphenopteris
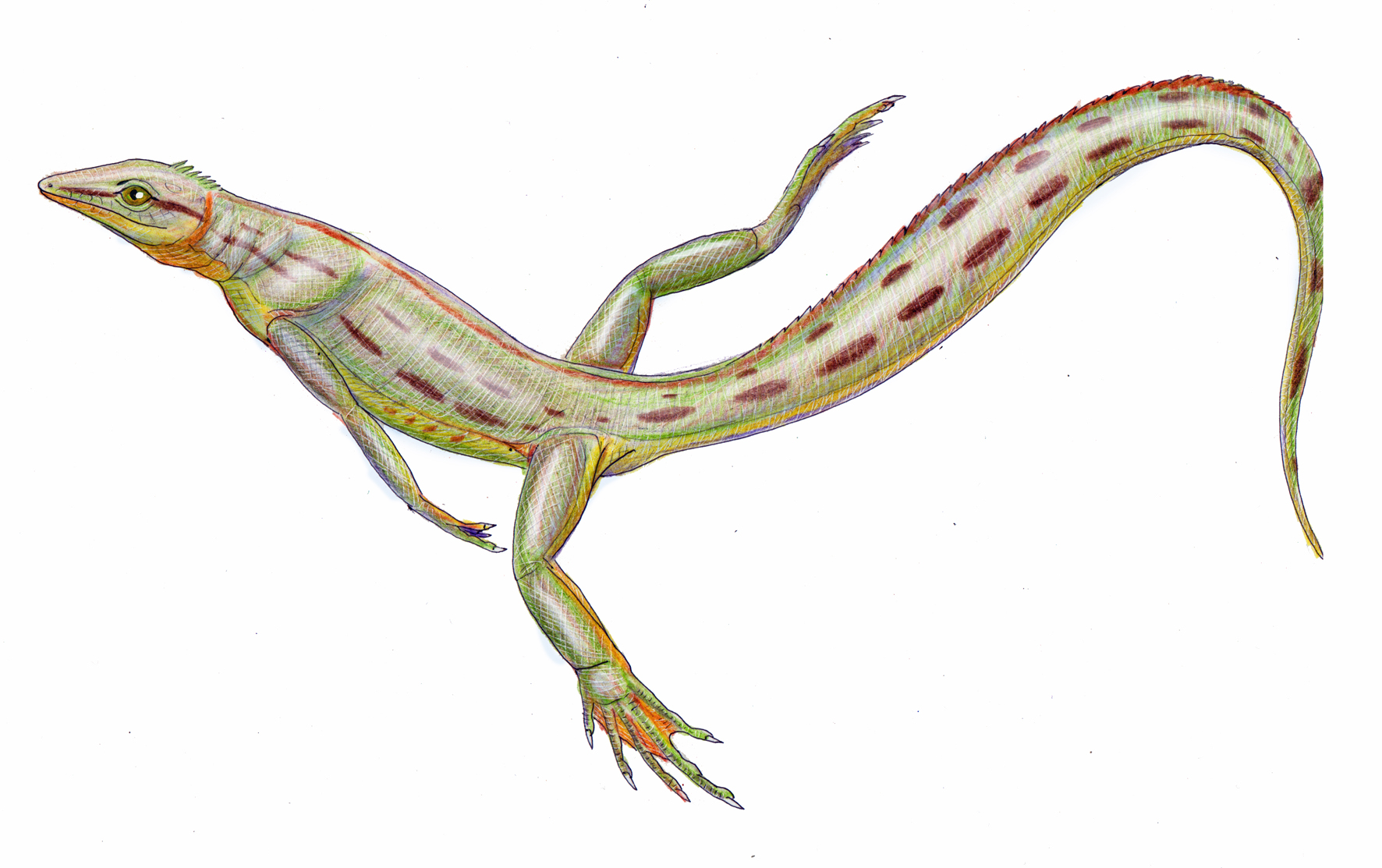
- Restoration of the Carboniferous reptile Spinoaequalis
  †Spinoaequalis – type locality for genus
- †Spirifer
  - †Spirifer rockymontanus – tentative report
- Spirorbis
- †Stemmatodus
- †Streptognathodus
  - †Streptognathodus zethus
- †Syringopora
- †Tetrataxis
- †Therates – type locality for genus
- †Treptichnus
- †Undichna
  - †Undichna britannica
  - †Undichna simplicitas
- †Urba – type locality for genus
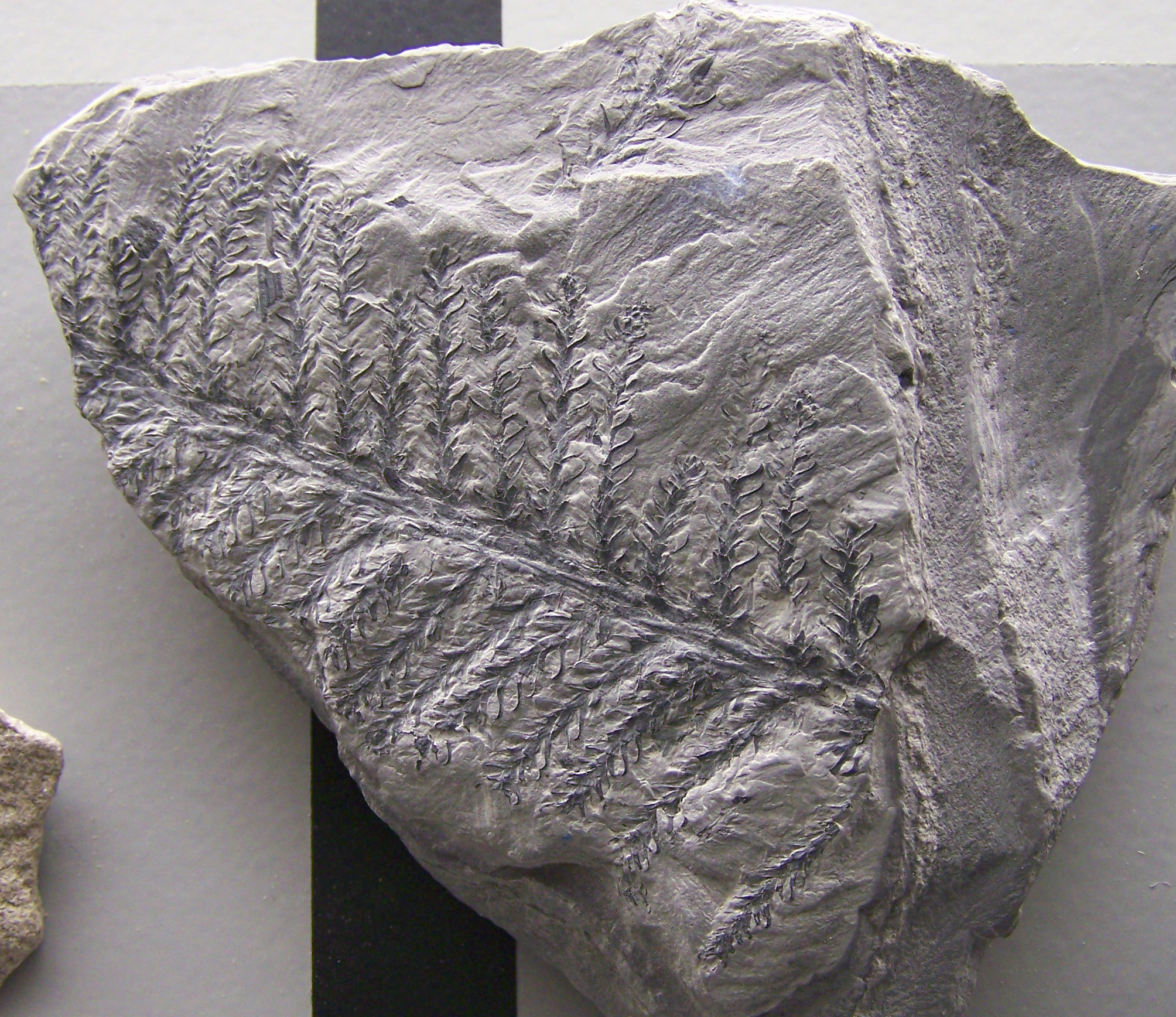
- Fossilized foliage of the Carboniferous-Permian conifer Walchia
  †Walchia
- †Wilkingia
- †Worthenia
- †Xyrospondylus
- Yoldia

== Mesozoic ==
=== Selected Mesozoic taxa of Kansas ===
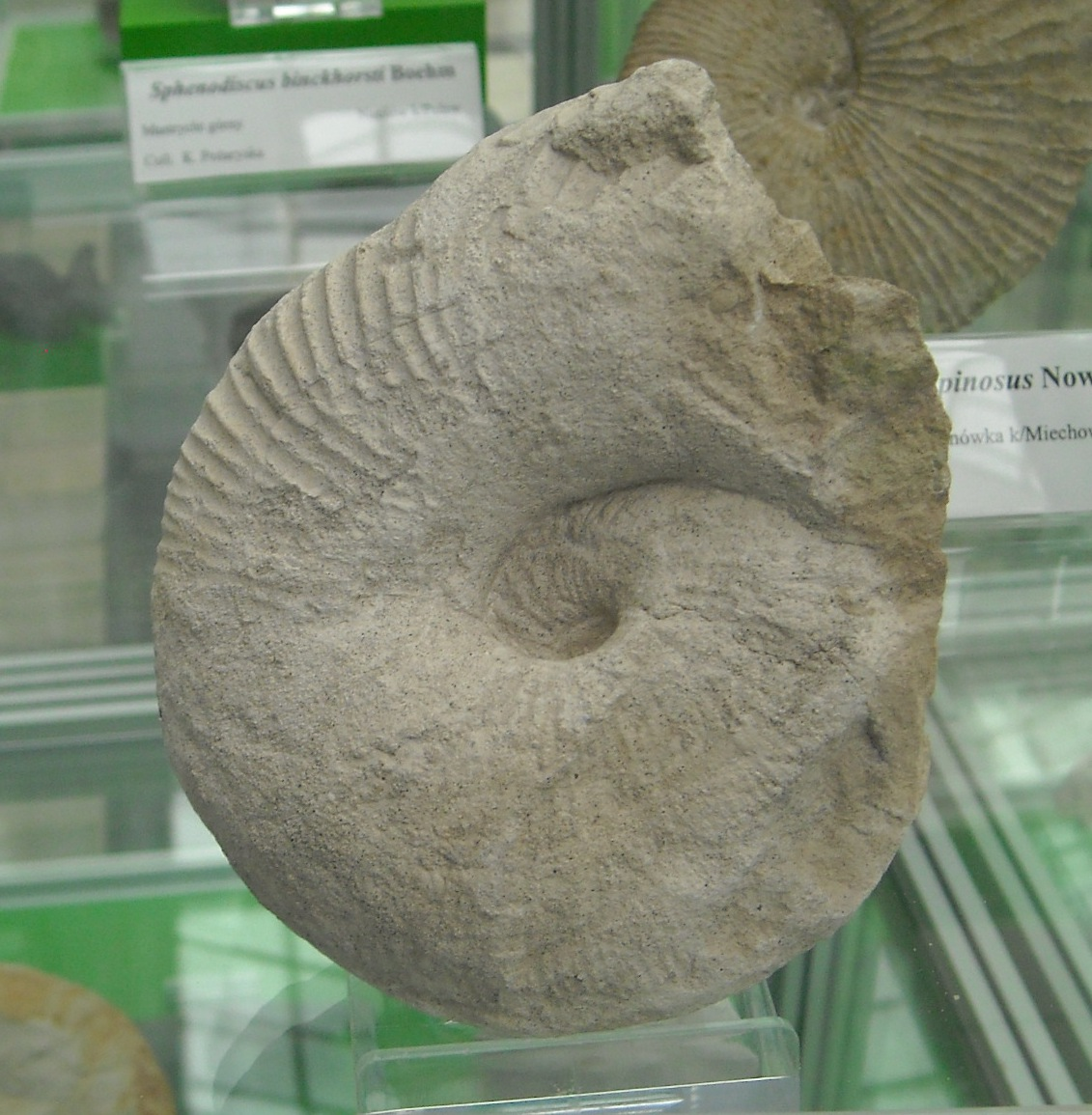
- Fossilized shell of the Late Cretaceous ammonoid cephalopod Acanthoscaphites
  †Acanthoscaphites – tentative report
  - †Acanthoscaphites reesidei
- †Alzadasaurus – type locality for genus
- †Ampullina
- †Anomia
- †Apateodus
- †Apatornis
  - †Apatornis celer – type locality for species
- †Apsopelix
  - †Apsopelix anglicus
- Aralia
- Arundo
- †Asplenium
- †Aviculopecten
  - †Aviculopecten occidentalis
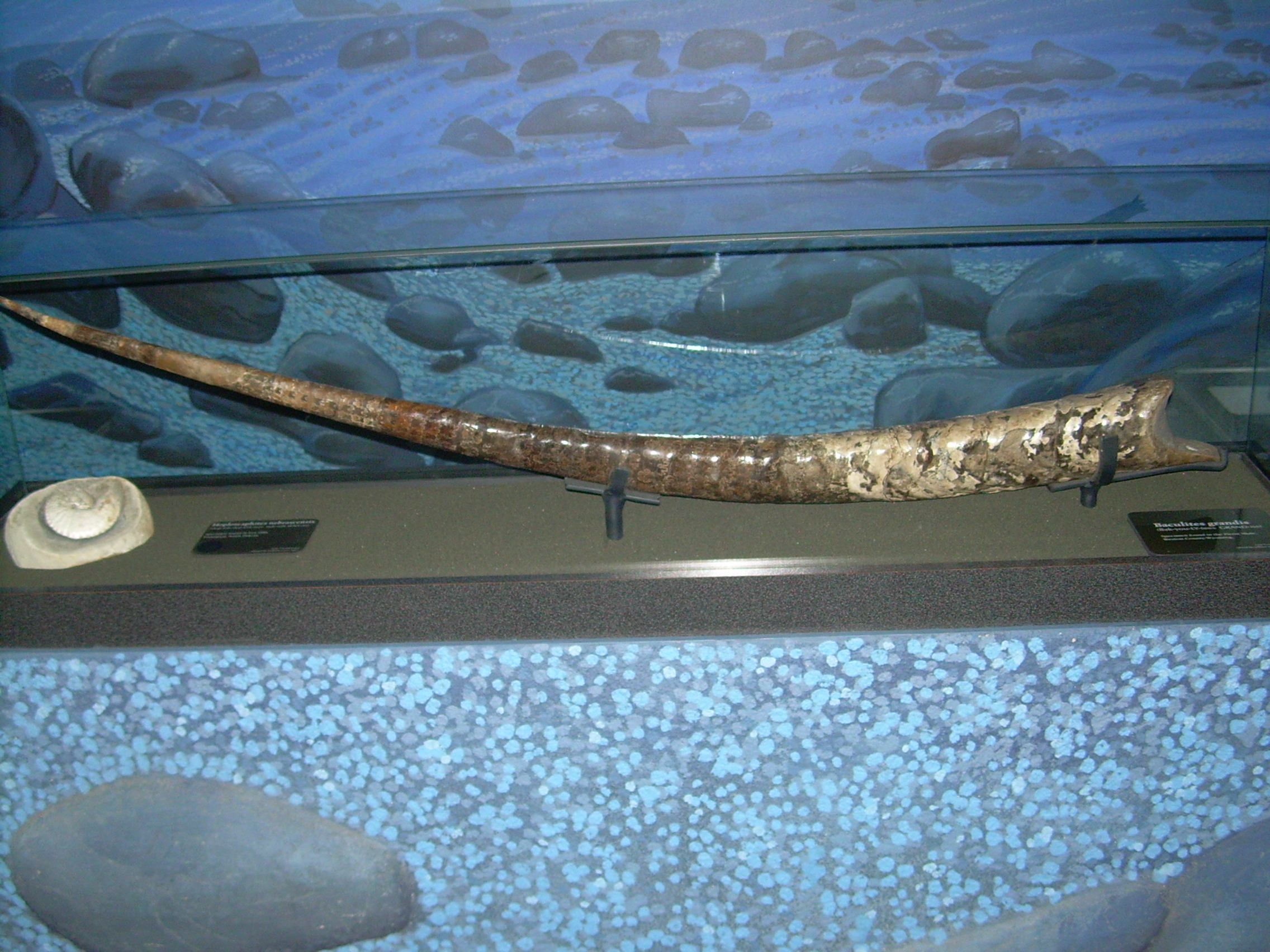
- Fossilized shell of the Late Cretaceous ammonoid cephalopod Baculites
  †Baculites
  - †Baculites clinolobatus
  - †Baculites compressus
  - †Baculites grandis
  - †Baculites ovatus
  - †Baculites pseudovatus – type locality for species
- †Bananogmius
- †Baptornis – type locality for genus
  - †Baptornis advenus – type locality for species
- Botula
  - †Botula carolinensis
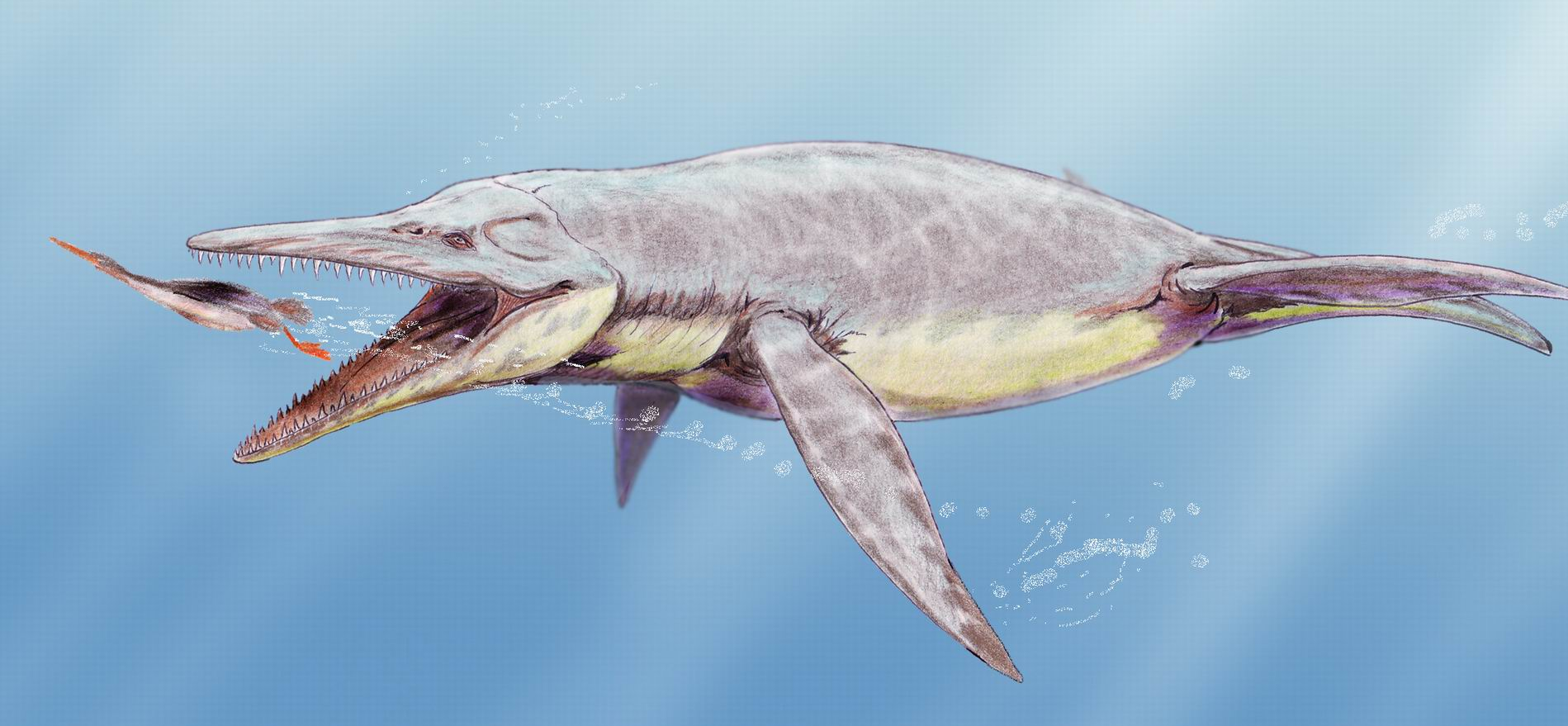
- Life restoration of the Late Cretaceous plesiosaur Brachauchenius hunting a hesperornithiform bird
  †Brachauchenius – type locality for genus
  - †Brachauchenius lucasi – type locality for species
- Brachidontes
- Cadulus
- †Calycoceras
- Carcharias
- Cardita
- †Cassiope
- †Ceratophyllum
- Chiloscyllium
- †Chondrites
- †Cimolichthys
  - †Cimolichthys nepaholica
- Cladophlebis
- †Claosaurus
  - †Claosaurus agilis – type locality for species
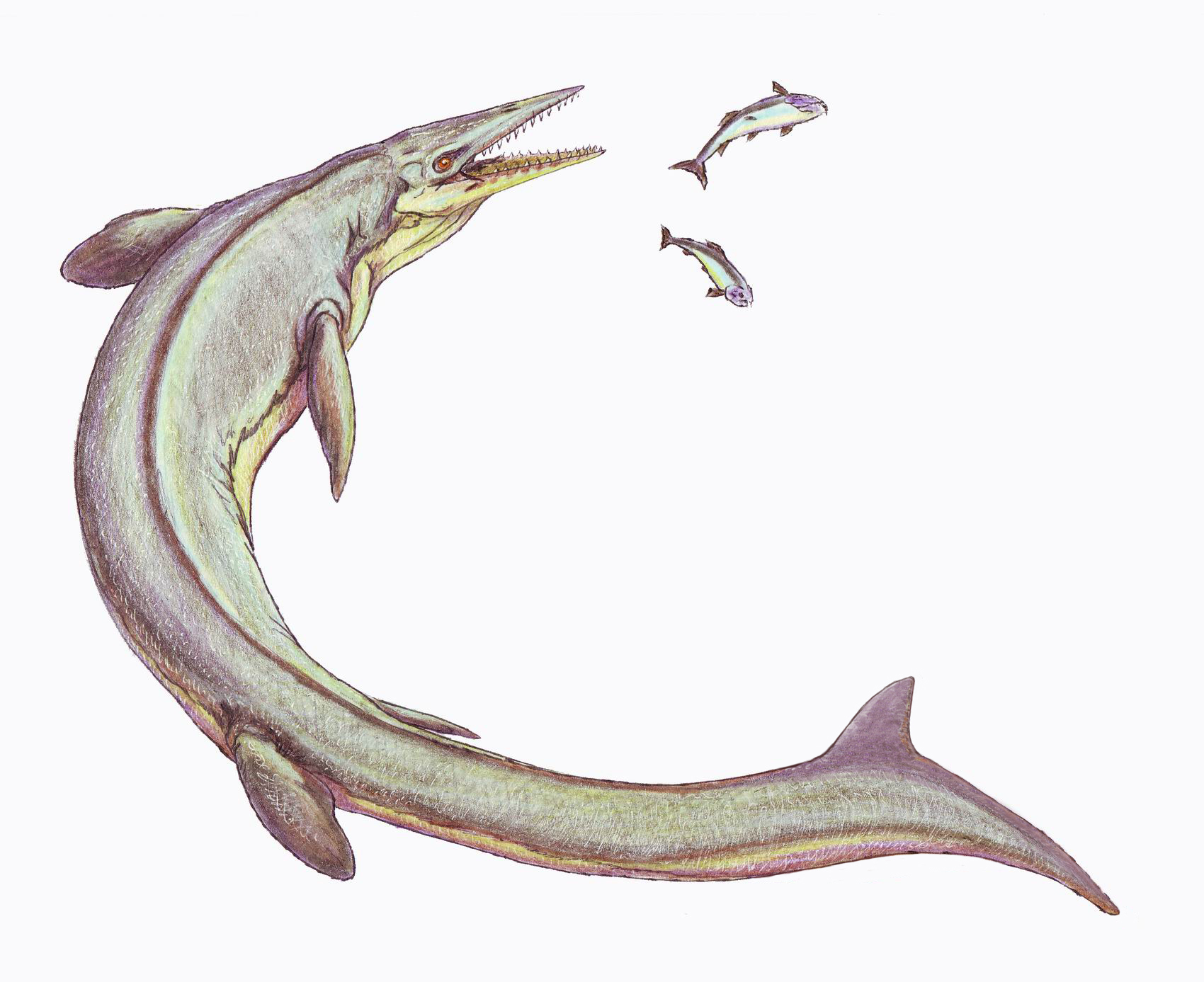
- Life restoration of the Late Cretaceous mosasaurid Clidastes
  †Clidastes
  - †Clidastes liodontus
  - †Clidastes velox
- Cliona
- †Collignoniceras
  - †Collignoniceras woollgari
- †Coniasaurus
- Corbula
- Crassostrea
- †Cretolamna
  - †Cretolamna appendiculata
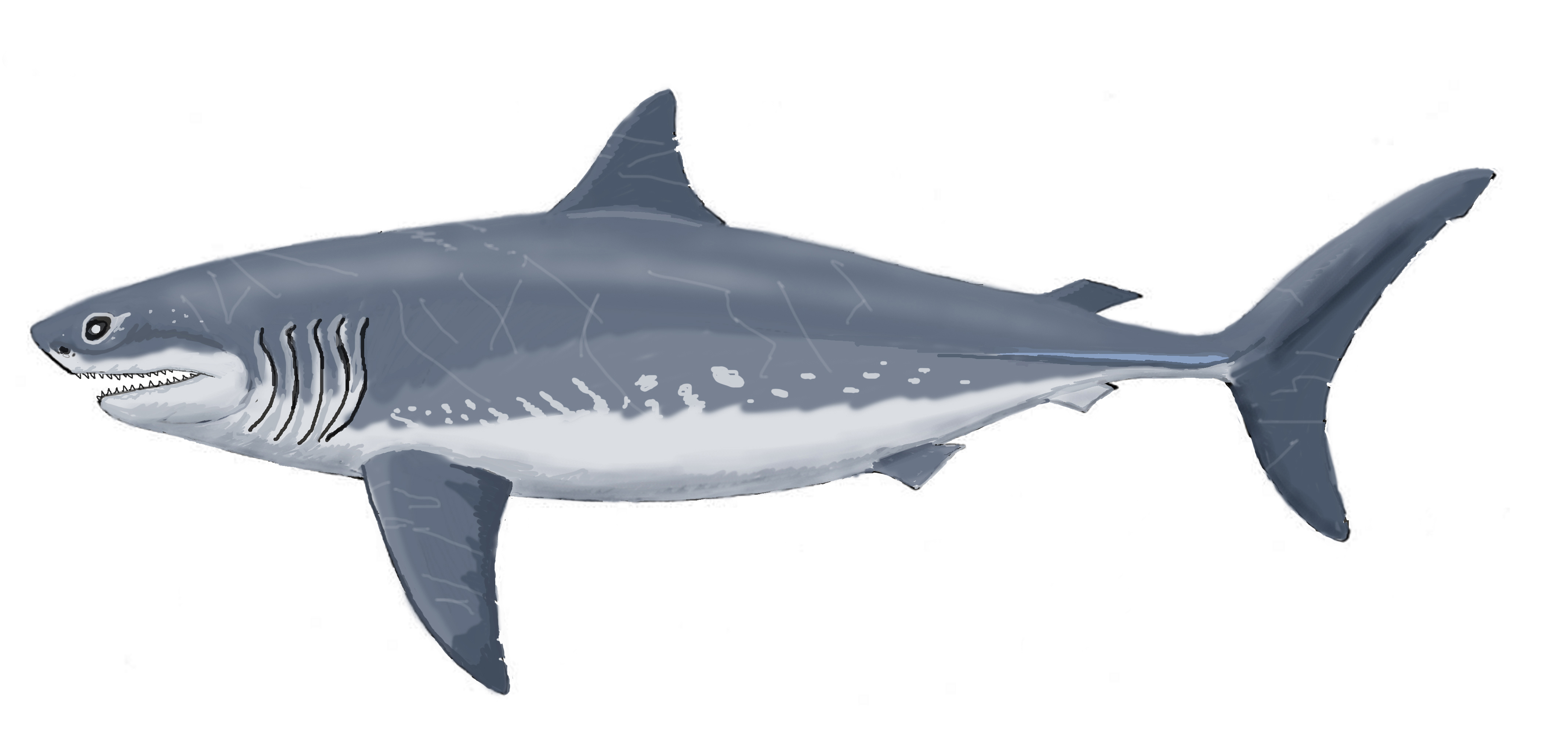
- Restoration of the Late Cretaceous shark Cretoxyrhina, or the Ginsu shark
  †Cretoxyrhina
  - †Cretoxyrhina mantelli
- Ctenochelys
- Cucullaea
- †Cycadeoidea
- †Dakotasuchus – type locality for genus
  - †Dakotasuchus kingi – type locality for species
- †Dawndraco – type locality for genus
  - †Dawndraco kanzai – type locality for species
- †Desmatochelys
- †Discoscaphites
- †Dolichorhynchops – type locality for genus
  - †Dolichorhynchops osborni – type locality for species
- †Durania
- †Ectenosaurus
  - †Ectenosaurus clidastoides
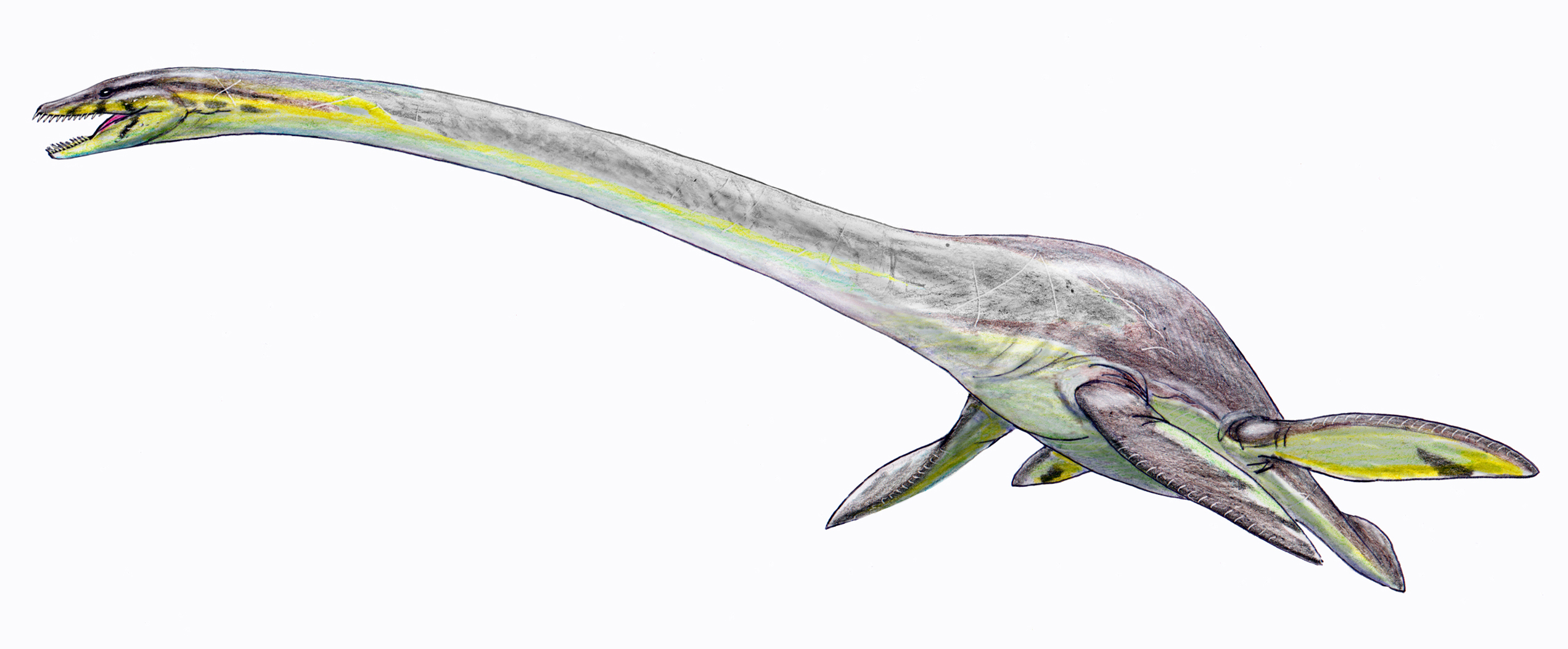
- Life restoration of the Late Cretaceous plesiosaur Elasmosaurus with an anachronistic human to scale
  †Elasmosaurus – type locality for genus
  - †Elasmosaurus nobilis – type locality for species
  - †Elasmosaurus platyurus – type locality for species
  - †Elasmosaurus sternbergi – type locality for species
- †Enchodus
  - †Enchodus gladiolus
  - †Enchodus petrosus
- †Euspira
- †Fagus
- †Gegania
- †Gervillia
  - †Gervillia mudgeana
  - †Gervillia mudgenana
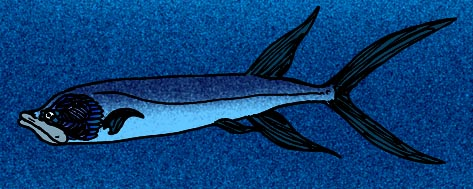
- Restoration of the Late Cretaceous bony fish Gillicus
  †Gillicus
  - †Gillicus arcuatus
- Gleichenia
- †Globidens
- †Gryphaea
  - †Gryphaea corrugata
  - †Gryphaea hilli
  - †Gryphaea mucronata
  - †Gryphaea navia
- †Halisaurus
  - †Halisaurus sternbergi – type locality for species
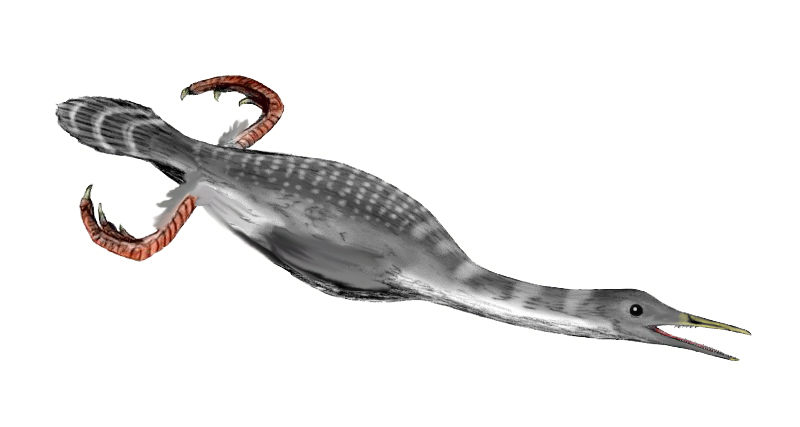
- Life restoration of the Late Cretaceous toothed bird Hesperornis
  †Hesperornis – type locality for genus
  - †Hesperornis crassipes – type locality for species
  - †Hesperornis gracilis – type locality for species
  - †Hesperornis regalis – type locality for species
- †Heteroceras
- †Hierosaurus – type locality for genus
- †Hoploscaphites
  - †Hoploscaphites nicolletii
- †Iaceornis
  - †Iaceornis marshi – type locality for species
- †Ichthyornis – type locality for genus
  - †Ichthyornis dispar – type locality for species
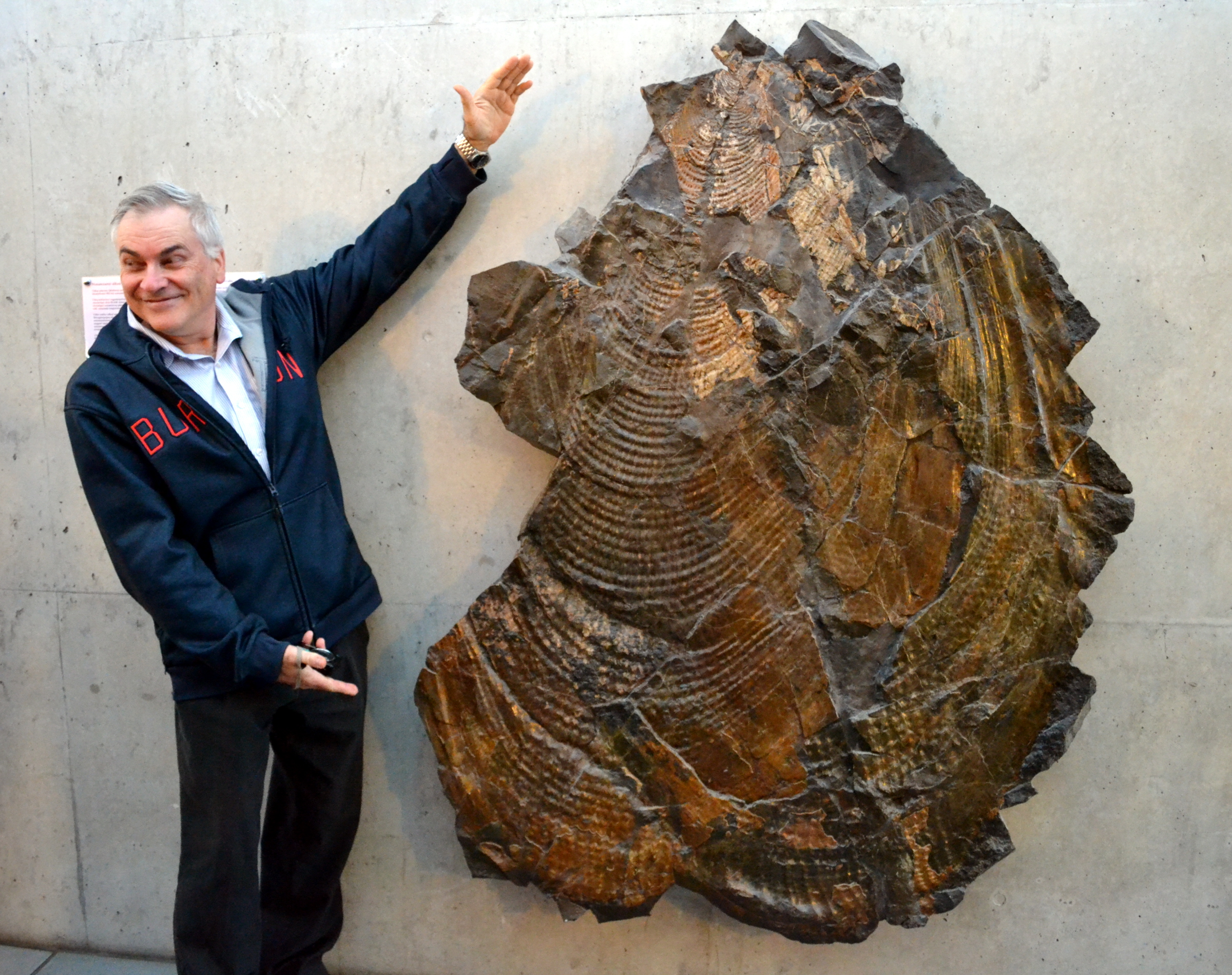
- Fossilized shell of the Early Jurassic-Late Cretaceous marine bivalve Inoceramus with a human indicating its size
  †Inoceramus
  - †Inoceramus cuvieri
  - †Inoceramus ginterensis
  - †Inoceramus tenuistriatus – tentative report
- †Ischyrhiza
  - †Ischyrhiza mira
- †Jeletzkytes
  - †Jeletzkytes nodosus
- †Leiosphaeridia
- †Leptostyrax
- †Linearis
- †Lingula
- Linuparus
- Lopha
- †Magnoavipes
- Marsilea
- †Mathilda
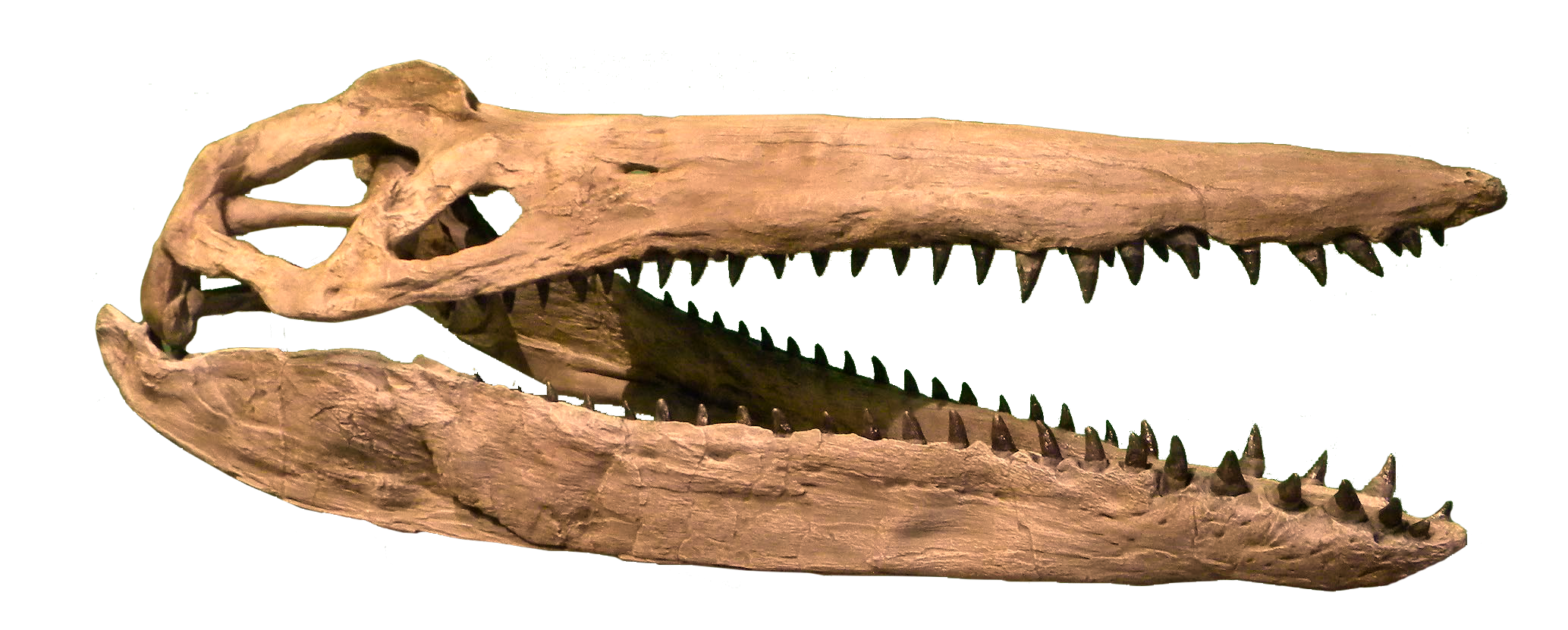
- Fossilized skull of the Late Cretaceous plesiosaur Megacephalosaurus
  †Megacephalosaurus – type locality for genus
  - †Megacephalosaurus eulerti – type locality for species
- Membranipora
- †Modiolus
- †Niobrarasaurus
  - †Niobrarasaurus coleii – type locality for species
- †Niobrarateuthis
  - †Niobrarateuthis bonneri – type locality for species
  - †Niobrarateuthis walkeri – type locality for species
- Nucula
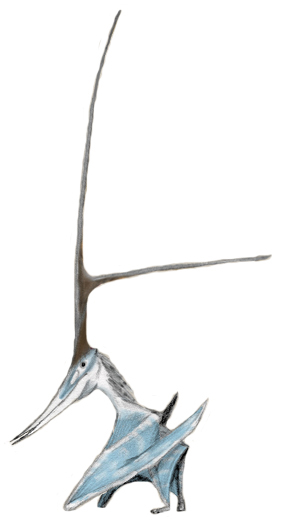
- Restoration of the Late Cretaceous pterosaur Nyctosaurus
  †Nyctosaurus
  - †Nyctosaurus bonneri – type locality for species
  - †Nyctosaurus gracilis – type locality for species
  - †Nyctosaurus nanus – type locality for species
- †Ogmodirus – type locality for genus
- Ostrea
- †Pachyrhizodus
  - †Pachyrhizodus caninus – or unidentified comparable form
  - †Pachyrhizodus minimus
- †Parahesperornis – type locality for genus
  - †Parahesperornis alexi – type locality for species
- †Pecten
- Pholadomya
- Pinus
- †Placenticeras
  - †Placenticeras meeki
- Platanus
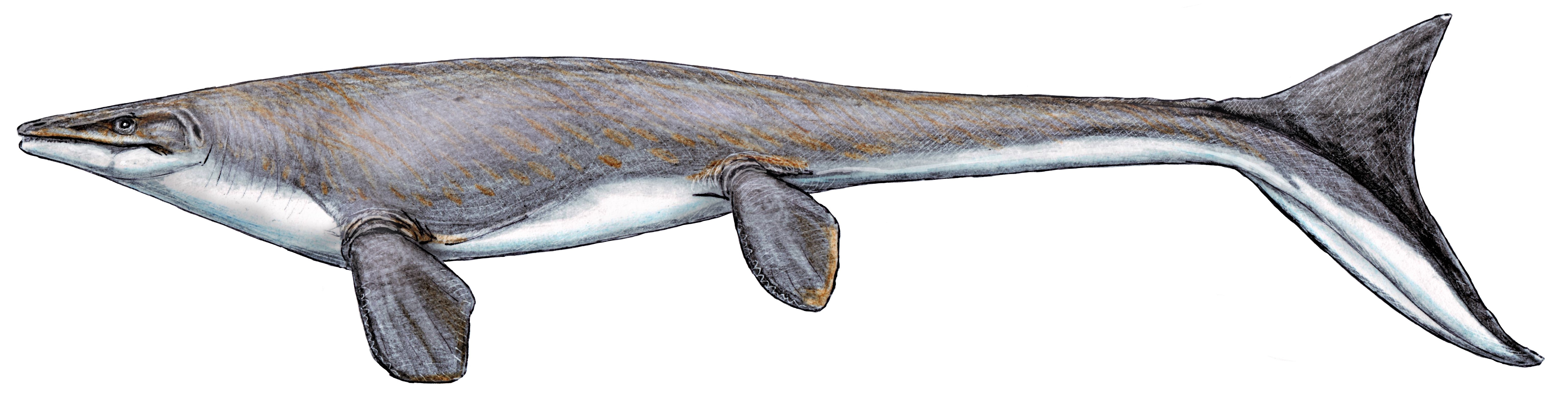
- Restoration of the Late Cretaceous mosasaur Platecarpus
  †Platecarpus
  - †Platecarpus planifrons – type locality for species
  - †Platecarpus tympaniticus
- †Platyceramus
  - †Platyceramus platinus
- †Platypterygius – or unidentified comparable form
- †Plesiochelys
- †Plesiosaurus
- Plicatula
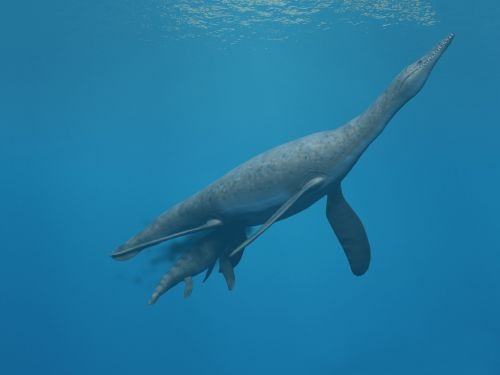
- Life restoration of the Late Cretaceous polycotylid plesiosaur Polycotylus giving birth
  †Polycotylus – type locality for genus
  - †Polycotylus latipinnis – type locality for species
- †Prisca – tentative report
- †Protocardia
- †Protosphyraena
  - †Protosphyraena tenuis
- †Protostega
- †Pseudoperna
  - †Pseudoperna congesta
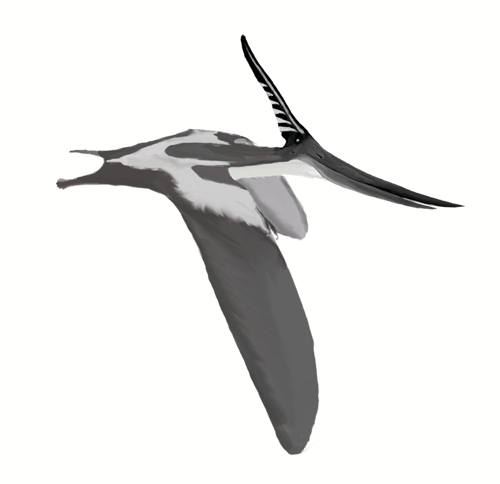
- Life restoration of the Late Cretaceous pterosaur Pteranodon
  †Pteranodon – type locality for genus
  - †Pteranodon comptus – type locality for species
  - †Pteranodon longiceps – type locality for species
  - †Pteranodon sternbergi – type locality for species
- †Pteria
- †Pterotrigonia
- †Ptychodus
  - †Ptychodus anonymus – or unidentified comparable form
  - †Ptychodus decurrens
  - †Ptychodus mortoni
  - †Ptychodus occidentalis
  - †Ptychodus whipplei
- †Ptychotrygon
  - †Ptychotrygon triangularis
- Quercus
- †Repichnia
- Rhinobatos
  - †Rhinobatos incertus
- †Rhizocorallium
- Sassafras
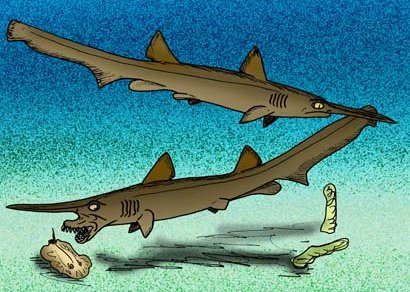
- Restoration of several of the Early Cretaceous-Miocene shark Scapanorhynchus
  †Scapanorhynchus
  - †Scapanorhynchus rhaphiodon
- †Scaphites
- †Scolicia
- Scyliorhinus
- †Selmasaurus
  - †Selmasaurus johnsoni – type locality for species
- †Sequoia
- Serpula
- †Silvisaurus – type locality for genus
  - †Silvisaurus condrayi – type locality for species
- Squalicorax
  - †Squalicorax curvatus
  - †Squalicorax falcatus
  - †Squalicorax kaupi
  - †Squalicorax pristodontus – or unidentified comparable form
  - †Squalicorax volgensis
- Sterculia
- Animated life restoration of the Late Cretaceous plesiosaur Styxosaurus
  †Styxosaurus – type locality for genus
  - †Styxosaurus snowii – type locality for species
- Tellina
- †Terminonaris
- †Toxochelys
  - †Toxochelys latiremis
- Trachycardium
- †Tragodesmoceras
- †Trinacromerum – type locality for genus
  - †Trinacromerum bentonianum – type locality for species
- Turritella
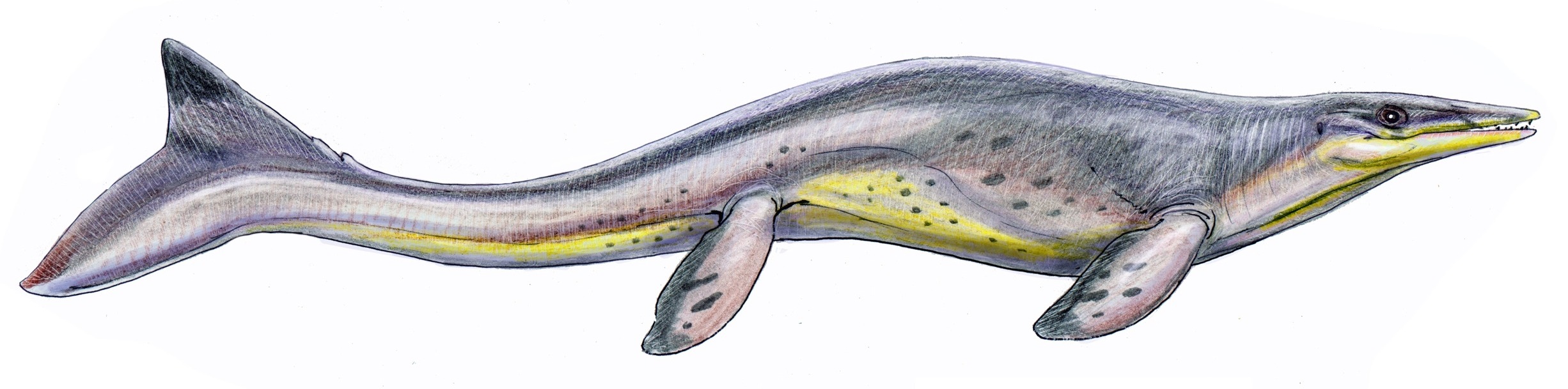
- Restoration of the Late Cretaceous mosasaur Tylosaurus
  †Tylosaurus
  - †Tylosaurus dyspelor
  - †Tylosaurus kansasensis – type locality for species
  - †Tylosaurus proriger
- †Uintacrinus
  - †Uintacrinus socialis
- †Urenchelys
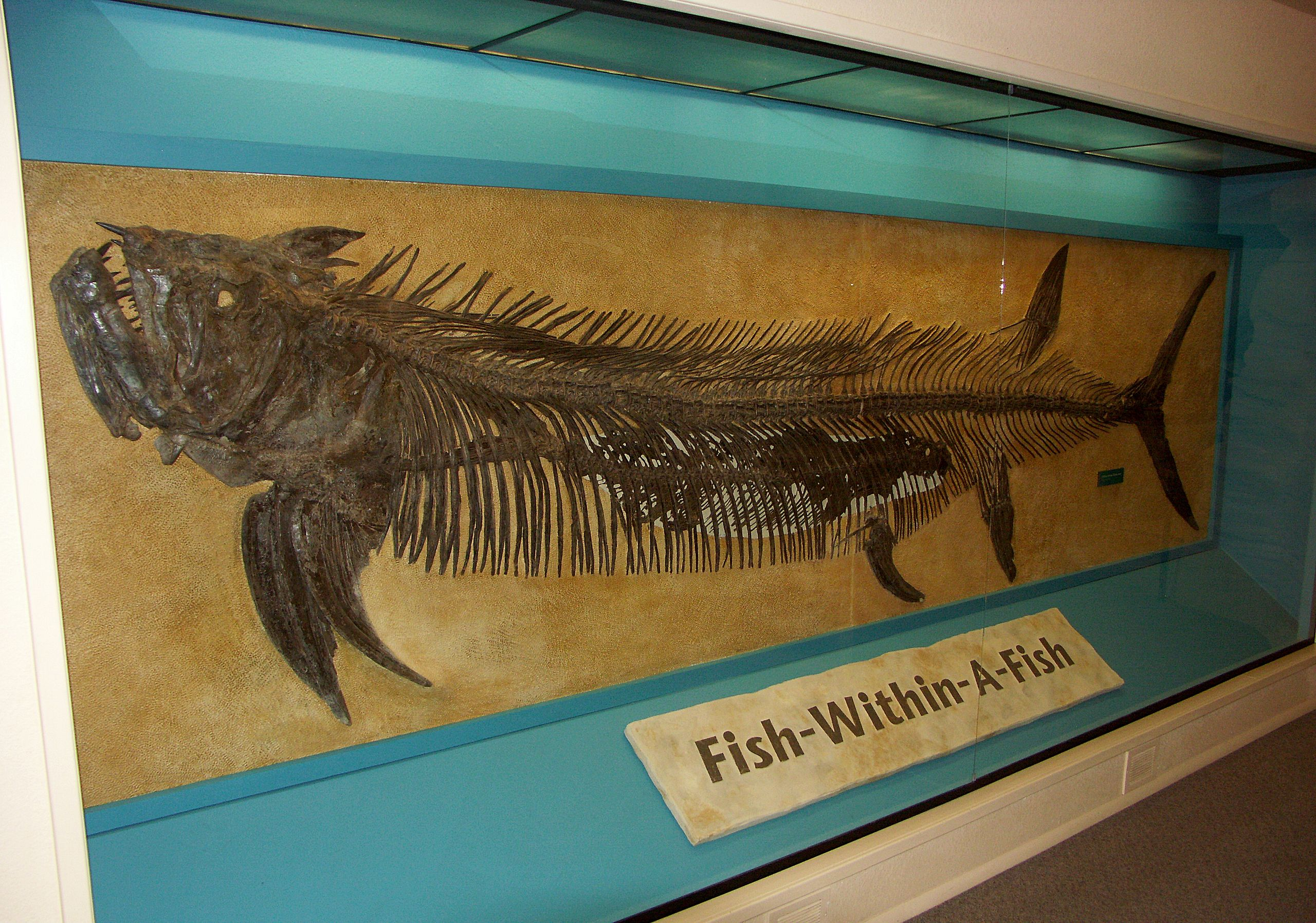
- Fish in a fish specimen
  †Xiphactinus
  - †Xiphactinus audax
- Yoldia

== Cenozoic ==
=== Selected Cenozoic taxa of Kansas ===
- Acris
  - †Acris crepitans
- †Adelphailurus
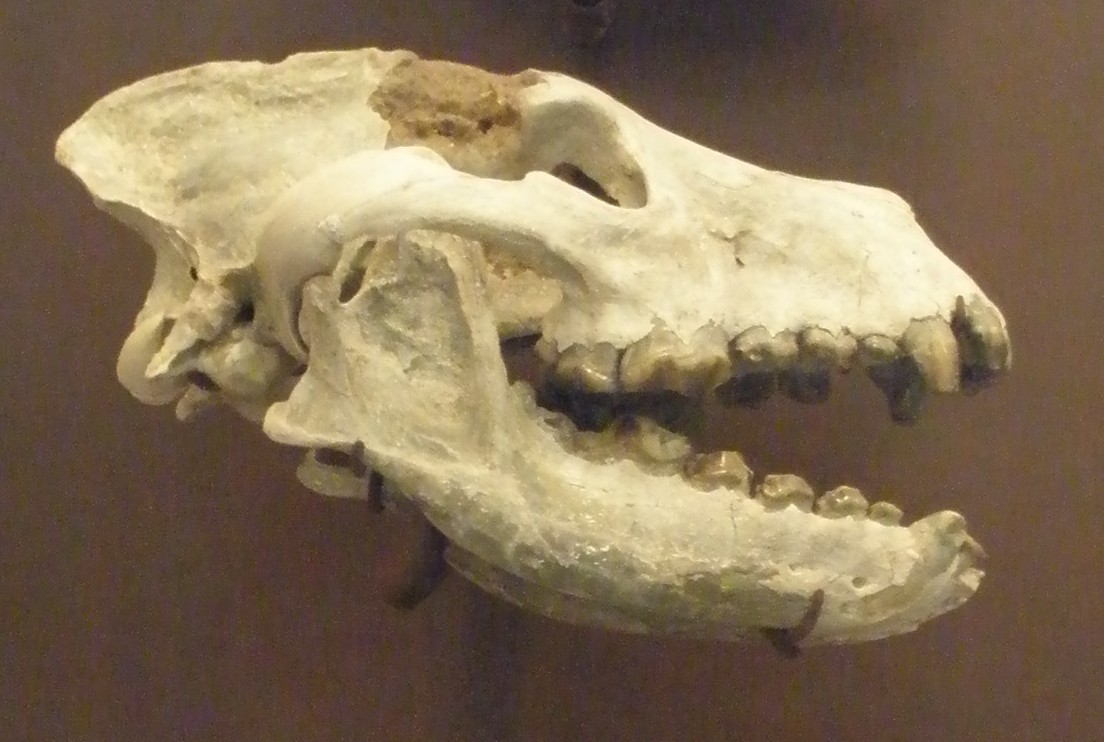
- Fossilized skull of the Miocene bone-crushing dog Aelurodon
  †Aelurodon
- Agkistrodon
- †Agriocharis
- †Agriotherium
- †Alforjas
- †Allogona
  - †Allogona profunda
- †Ambystoma
  - †Ambystoma maculatum
  - †Ambystoma tigrinum
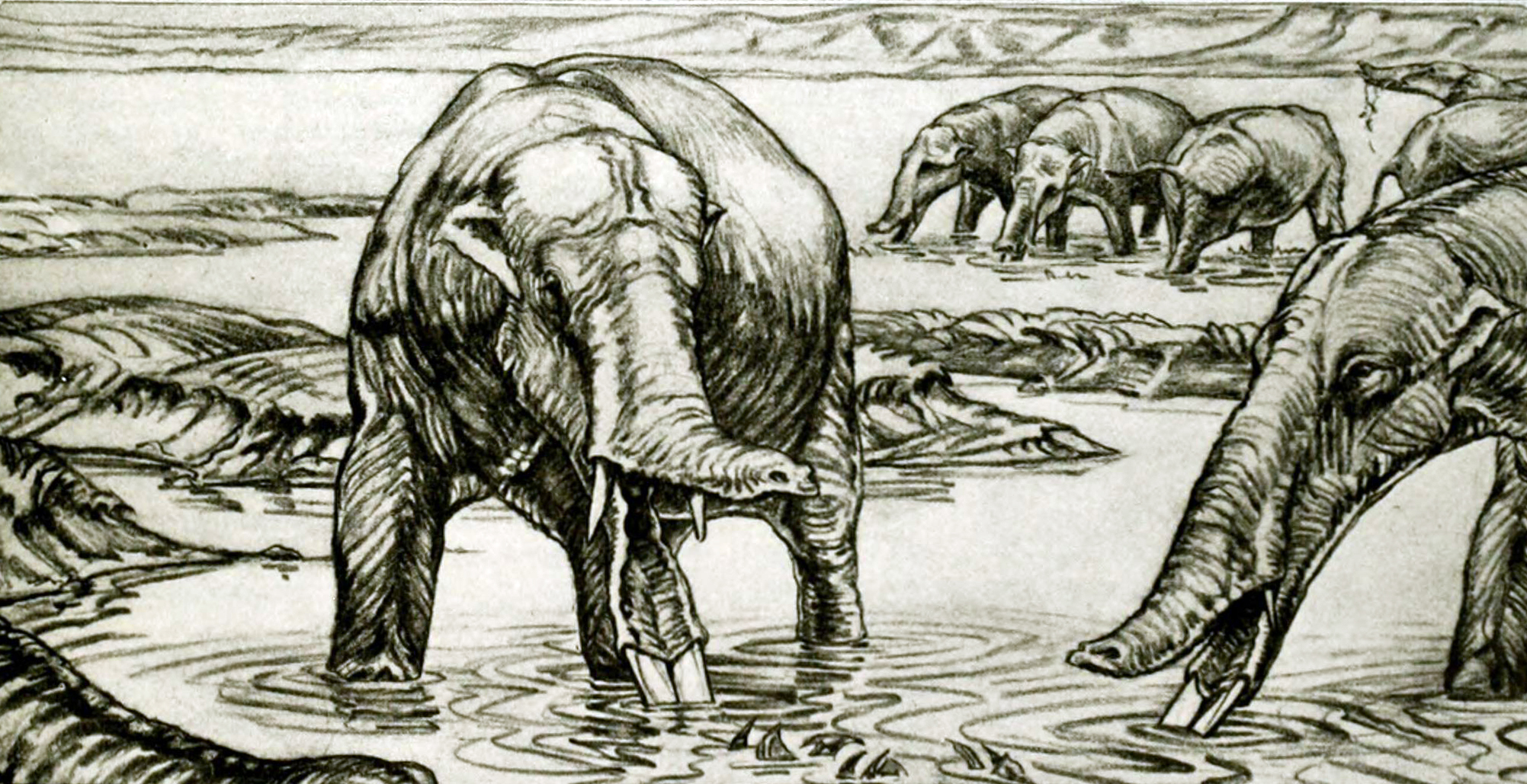
- Life restoration of the Miocene elephant relative Amebelodon. Margret Flinsch (1932).
  †Amebelodon
- Amia
  - †Amia calva
- †Amphimachairodus
- Anas
  - †Anas crecca
- †Aphelops
- Aplodinotus
  - †Aplodinotus grunniens – or unidentified comparable form
- †Arctodus
  - †Arctodus pristinus – or unidentified comparable form
  - †Arctodus simus
- †Astrohippus
- Baiomys
- †Barbourofelis
- Bassariscus
- Bison
  - †Bison antiquus – type locality for species
  - †Bison bison
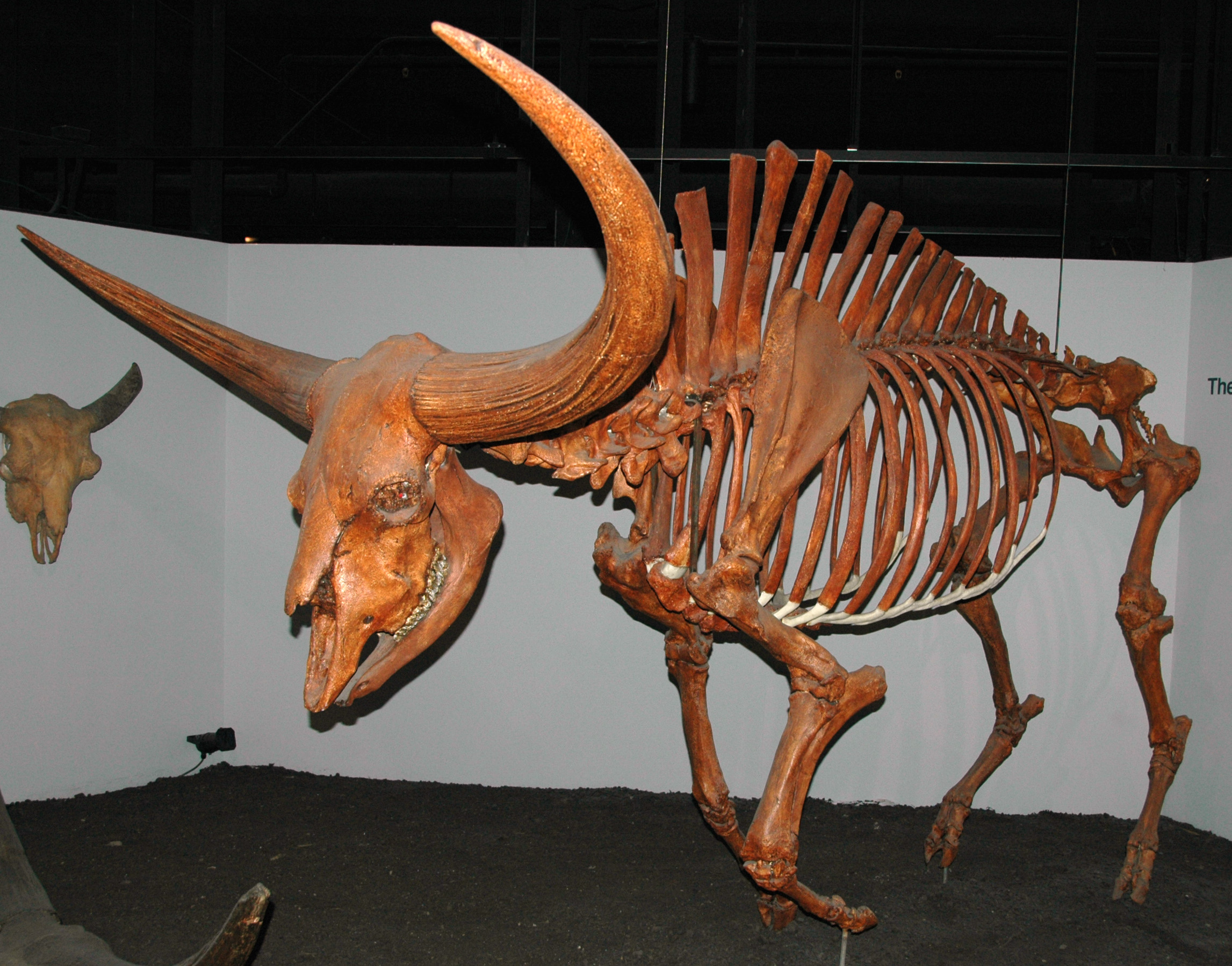
  - Mounted fossilized skeleton of the Pleistocene Bison latifrons, also known as the giant bison or long-horned bison
    †Bison latifrons
- Blarina
  - †Blarina brevicauda
  - †Blarina carolinensis
- †Borophagus
  - †Borophagus diversidens
  - †Borophagus hilli
  - †Borophagus pugnator
  - †Borophagus secundus – type locality for species
- Botaurus
- Bufo
  - †Bufo cognatus
  - †Bufo hemiophrys
  - †Bufo marinus
  - †Bufo woodhousei
- †Calippus
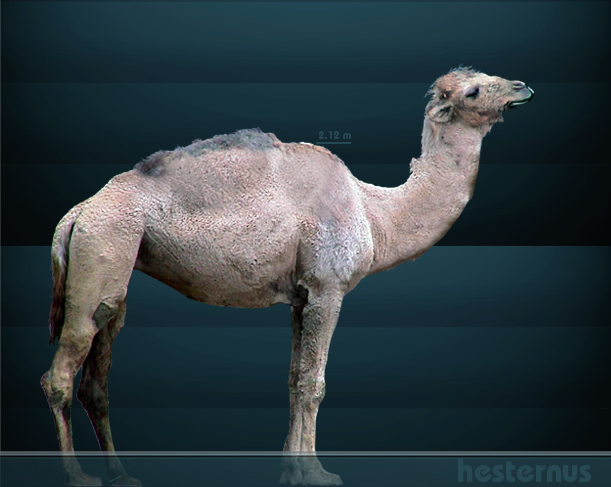
- Life restoration of the Pliocene-Holocene camel Camelops
  †Camelops
- Candona
- Canis
  - †Canis armbrusteri
  - †Canis dirus
  - †Canis edwardii
  - †Canis ferox
  - †Canis latrans
  - †Canis lepophagus
- †Capromeryx
- †Carpocyon
- Carychium
  - †Carychium exiguum
- Castor
  - †Castor canadensis
- †Castoroides
  - †Castoroides ohioensis – or unidentified comparable form
- †Catostomus
  - †Catostomus commersoni
- Celtis
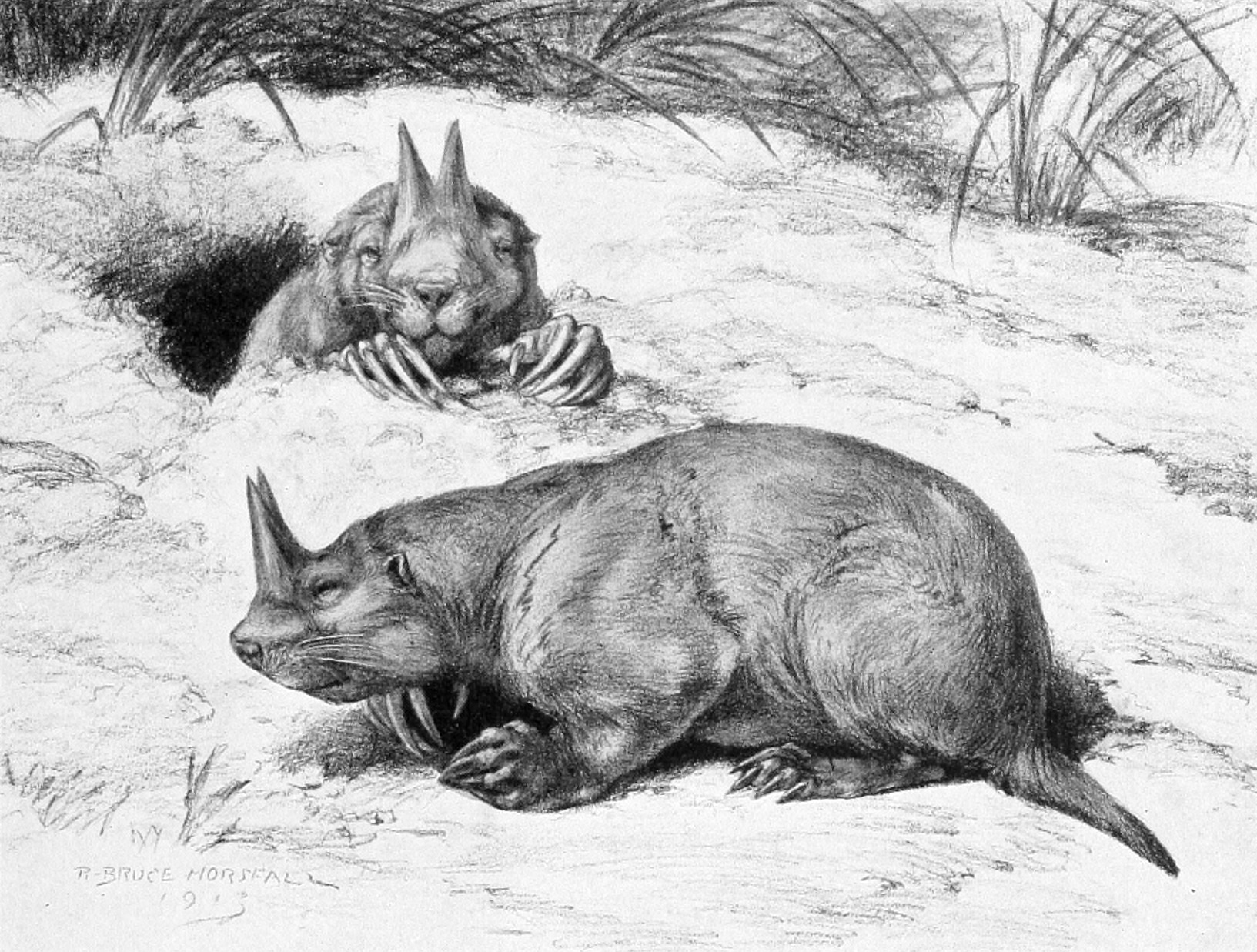
- Life restoration of the Miocene-Pleistocene horned gopher Ceratogaulus. Robert Bruce Horsfall (1913).
  †Ceratogaulus
  - †Ceratogaulus hatcheri
  - †Ceratogaulus minor
- †Cervalces
  - †Cervalces scotti
- Cervus
  - †Cervus elaphus
- Chaetodipus
  - †Chaetodipus hispidus
- Chara
- †Chasmaporthetes
- Chelydra
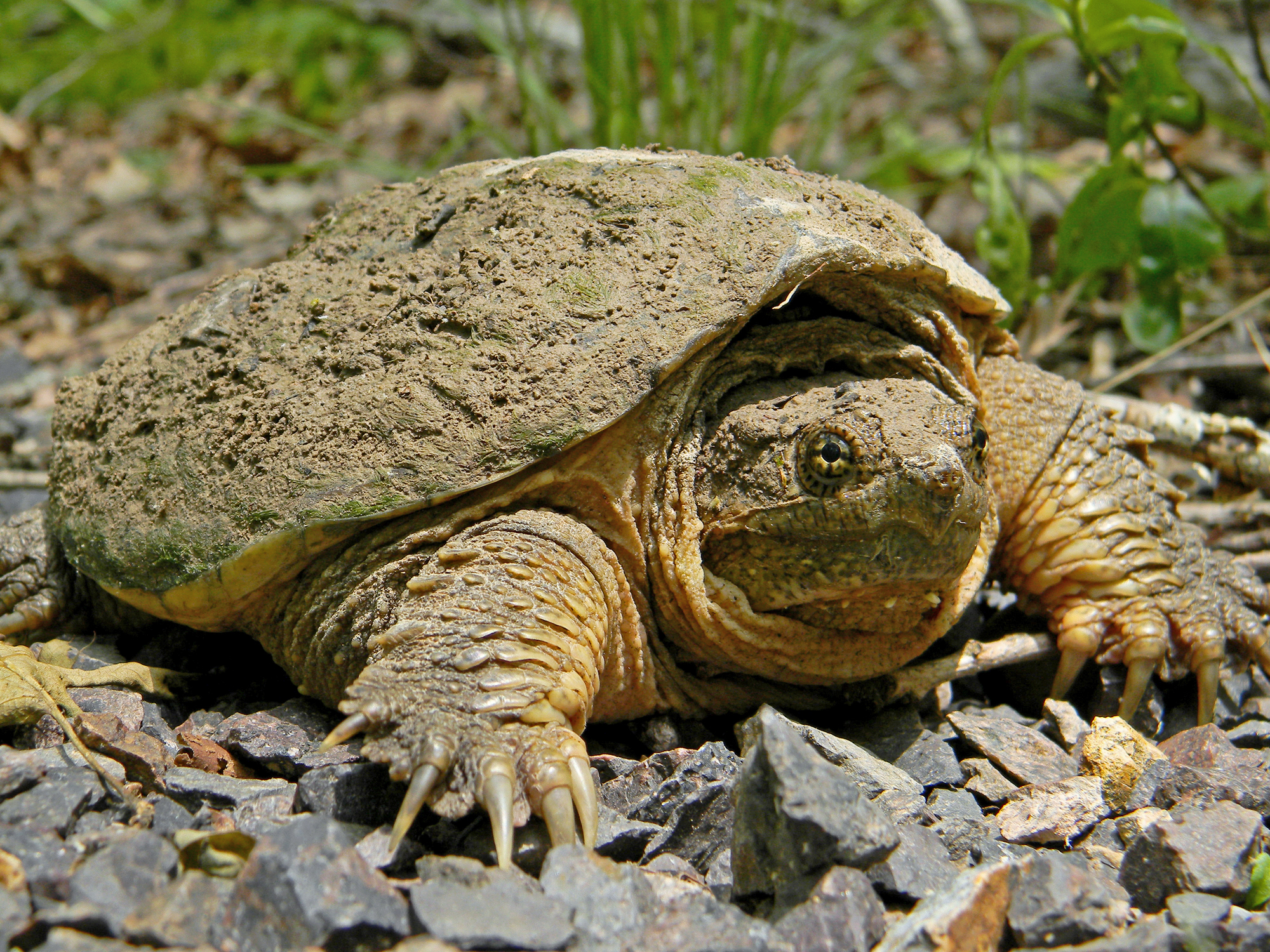
  - A living Chelydra serpentina, or common snapping turtle
    †Chelydra serpentina
- Chrysemys
  - †Chrysemys picta
- †Cionella
  - †Cionella lubrica
- Clethrionomys
  - †Clethrionomys gapperi
- Cnemidophorus
  - †Cnemidophorus sexlineatus
- Coluber
  - †Coluber constrictor
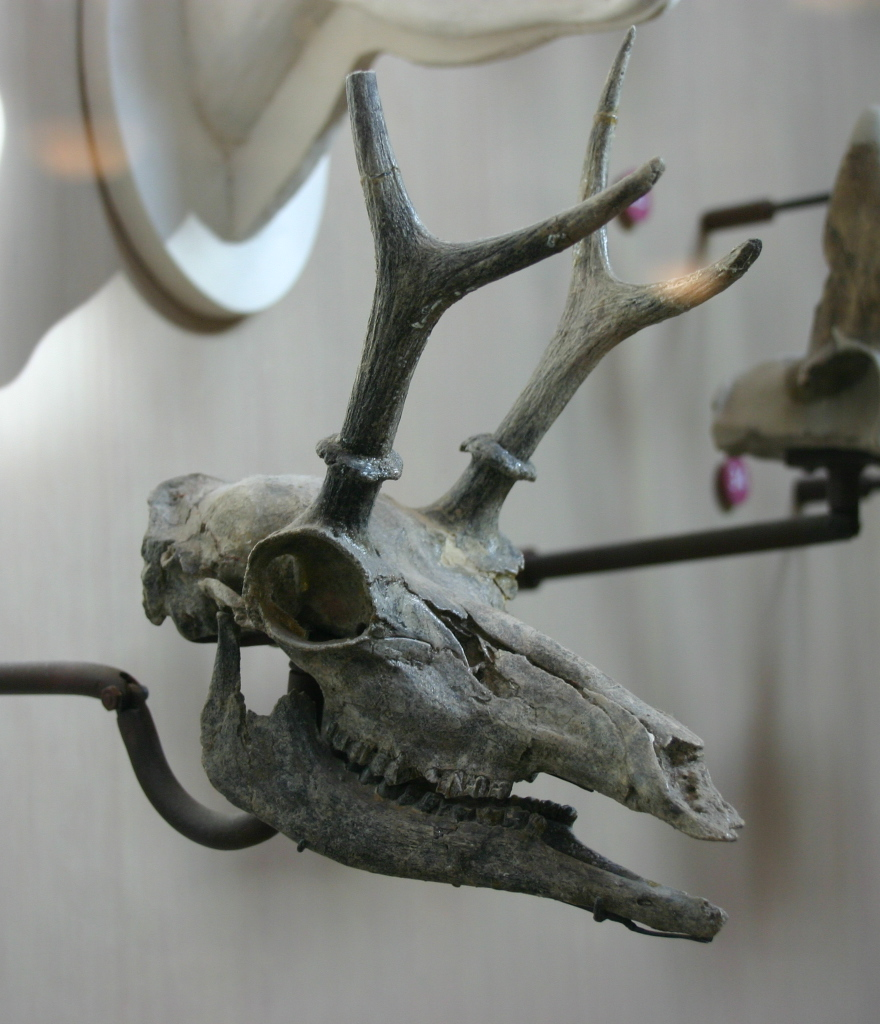
- Fossilized skull of the Miocene pronghorn Cosoryx
  †Cosoryx
  - †Cosoryx furcatus
- Crotalus
  - †Crotalus viridis
- †Cryptantha
- Cryptotis
  - †Cryptotis parva
- Cynomys
  - †Cynomys gunnisoni – or unidentified comparable form
  - †Cynomys ludovicianus
- Deroceras
- Diadophis
  - †Diadophis punctatus
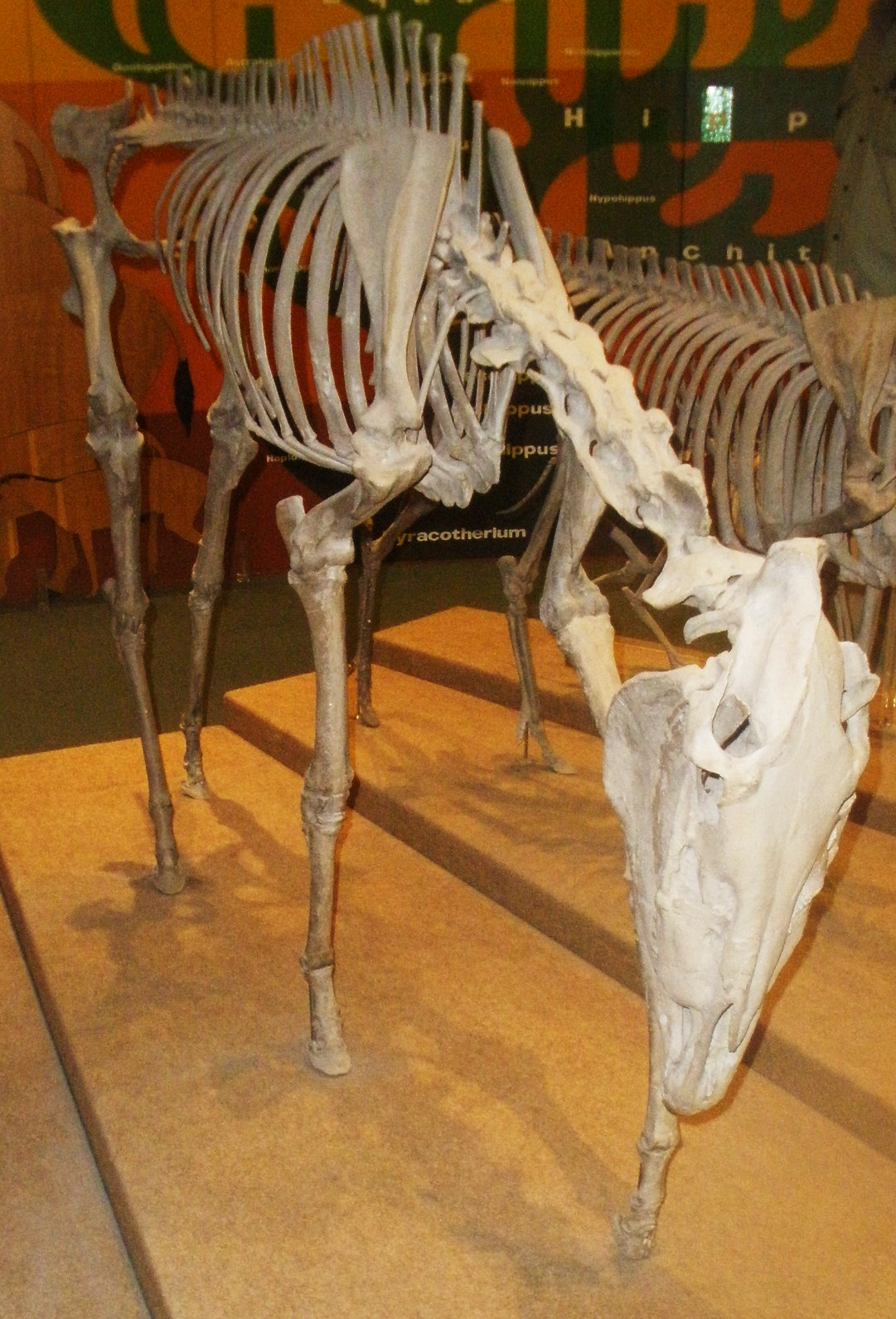
- Mounted fossilized skeleton of the Miocene-Pliocene horse Dinohippus
  †Dinohippus
- Dipodomys
  - †Dipodomys ordii – or unidentified comparable form
- †Dipoides
- Discus
- Egretta
- Elaphe – type locality for genus
  - †Elaphe obsoleta
  - †Elaphe vulpina
- Emydoidea
- †Epicyon
  - †Epicyon haydeni
- Equus
  - †Equus conversidens
  - †Equus francisci
  - †Equus giganteus – or unidentified comparable form
  - †Equus niobrarensis
  - †Equus scotti
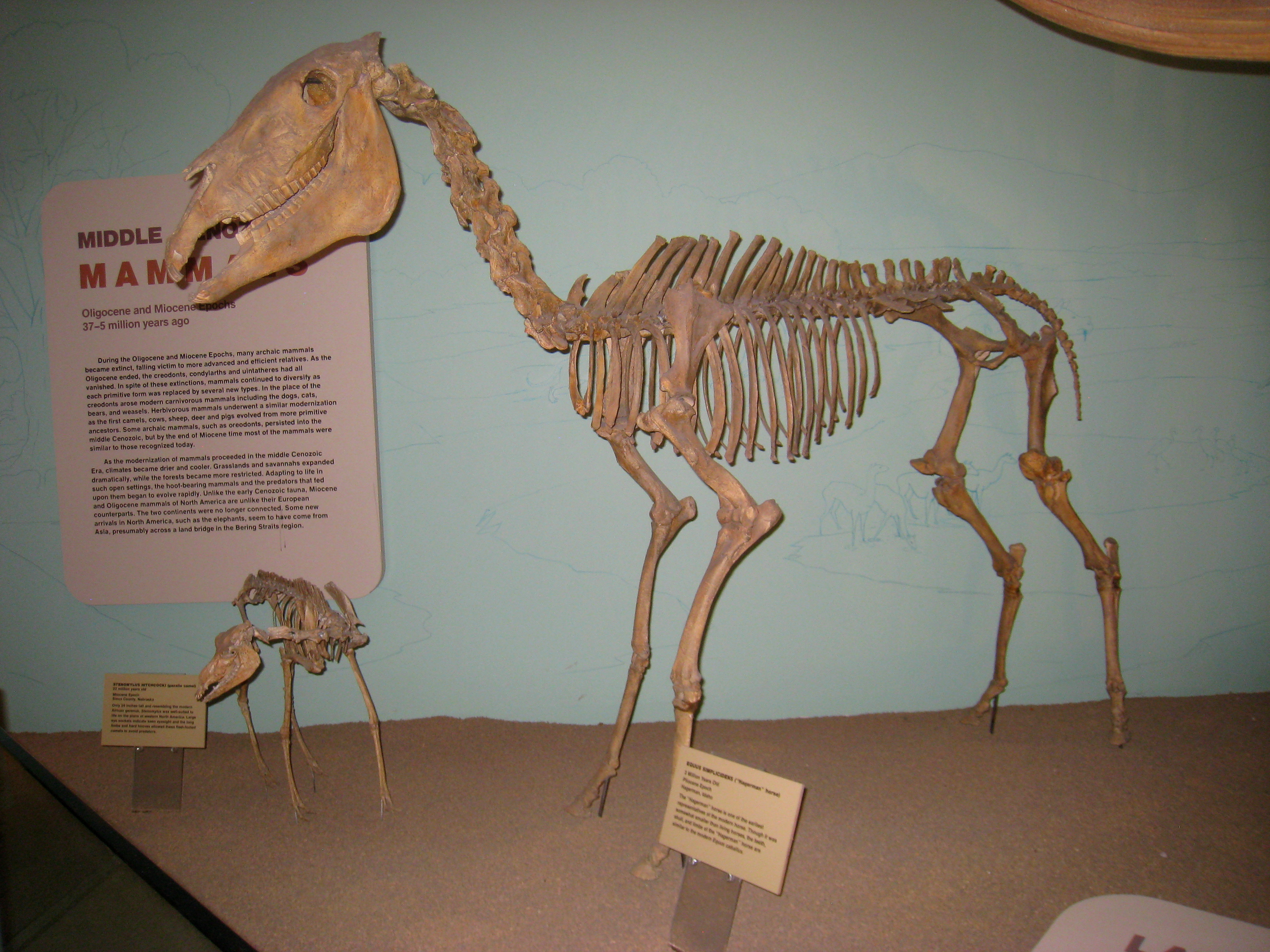
  - Fossilized skeleton of the Pliocene-Pleistocene horse Equus simplicidens, also known as the Hagerman horse or American zebra
    †Equus simplicidens
- †Eucastor
- †Euconulus
  - †Euconulus fulvus
- †Eucyon
  - †Eucyon davisi
- Eumeces
  - †Eumeces fasciatus
  - †Eumeces obsoletus
  - †Eumeces septentrionalis
- Felis
- Ferrissia
- †Fundulus
- Gastrocopta
  - †Gastrocopta armifera
- Geochelone
- Geomys
  - †Geomys bursarius
- Gerrhonotus
- †Gigantocamelus
- †Gnathabelodon
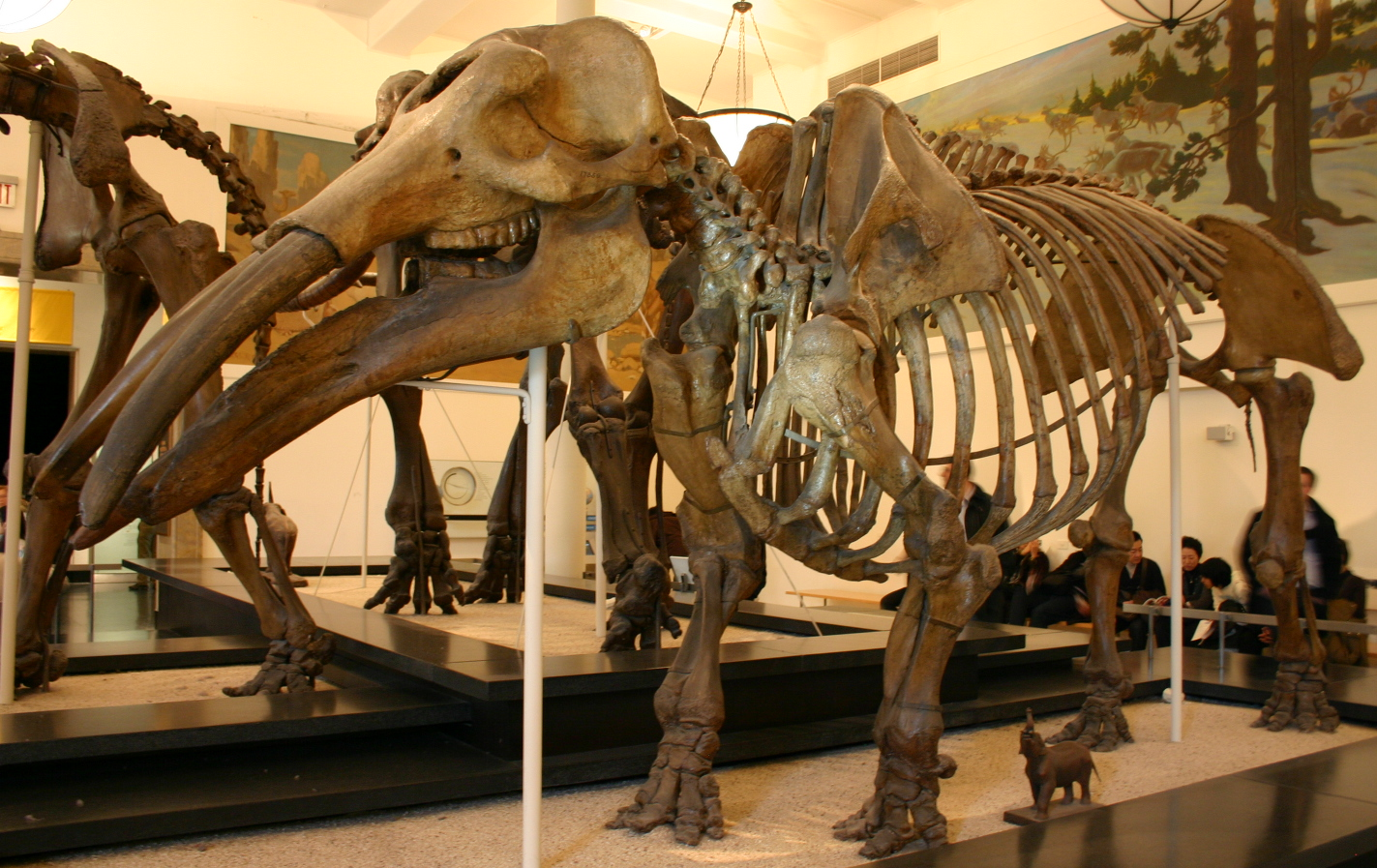
- Mounted fossilized skeleton of the Miocene-Pleistocene elephant relative Gomphotherium
  †Gomphotherium
- Gopherus
- Graptemys
  - †Graptemys geographica
- Grus
  - †Grus americana
- Gyraulus
  - †Gyraulus parvus
- Hawaiia
  - †Hawaiia minuscula
- Helicodiscus
  - †Helicodiscus parallelus
- Helisoma
  - †Helisoma anceps
  - †Helisoma trivolvis
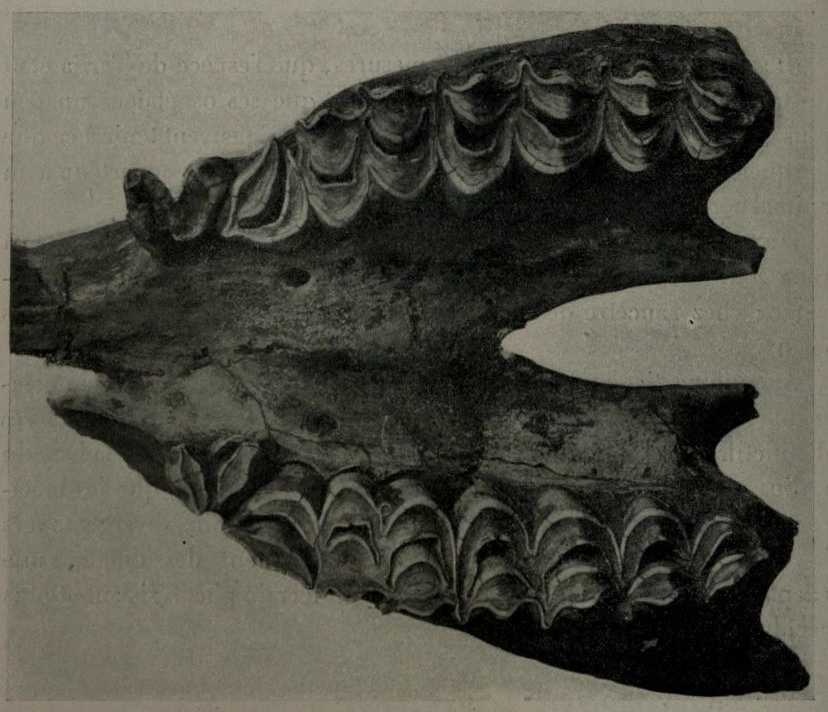
- Fossilized lower jaw of the Miocene-Pleistocene llama relative Hemiauchenia
  †Hemiauchenia
  - †Hemiauchenia macrocephala
- †Hesperotestudo
- Heterodon
  - †Heterodon nasicus
  - †Heterodon platyrhinos
- †Hipparion
- †Hippotherium
- Holbrookia
  - †Holbrookia maculata
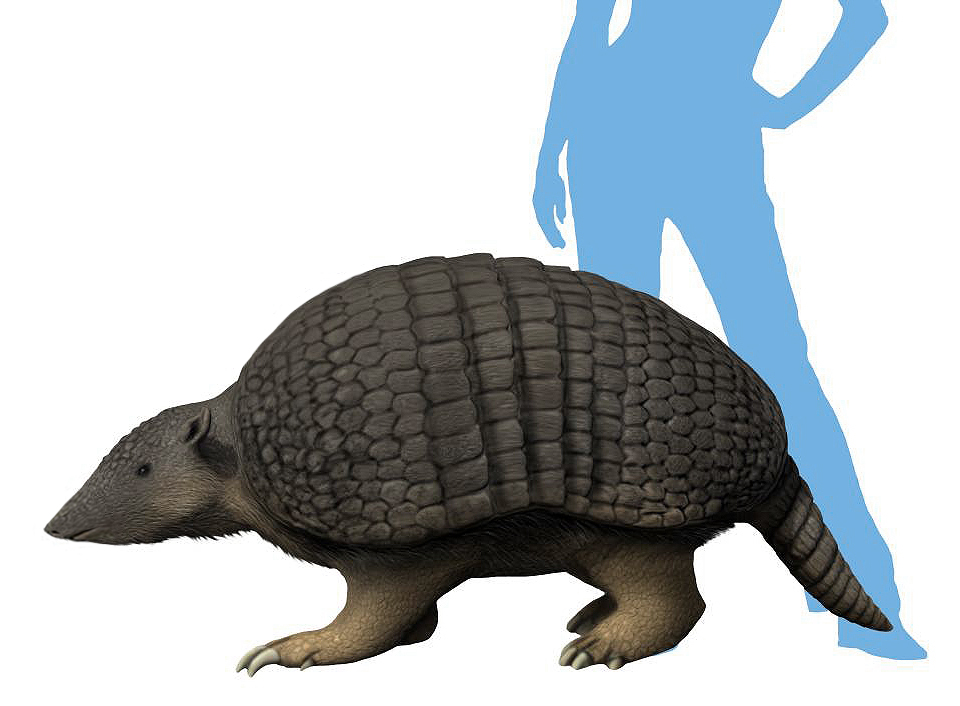
- Life restoration of the Pleistocene armadillo relative Holmesina with a human to scale
  †Holmesina
- Homo
  - †Homo sapiens
- †Homotherium
  - †Homotherium serum
- Hyla
  - †Hyla cinerea – or unidentified comparable form
  - †Hyla gratiosa – or unidentified comparable form
  - †Hyla squirella – or unidentified comparable form
  - †Hyla versicolor
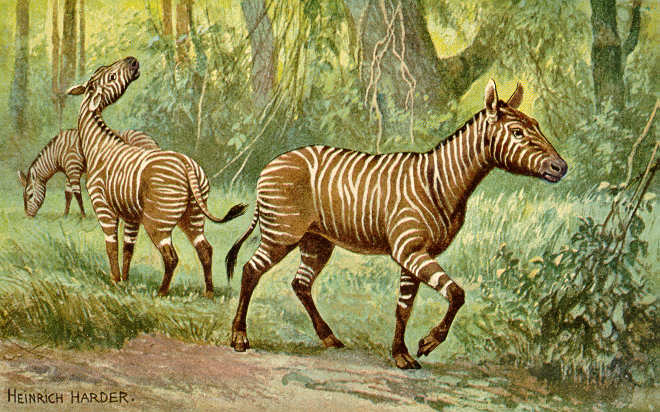
- Life restoration of the Miocene horse Hypohippus. Heinrich Harder (1920).
  †Hypohippus
- †Hypolagus
- Ictalurus
  - †Ictalurus melas
  - †Ictalurus punctatus
- †Ictiobus
- †Ischyrocyon – tentative report
- Kinosternon
  - †Kinosternon flavescens
  - †Kinosternon subrubrum
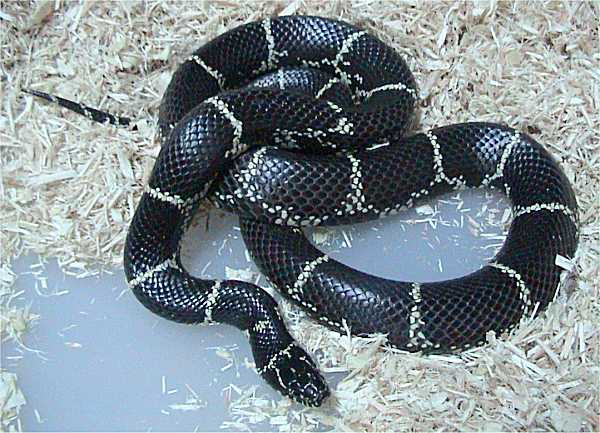
- A living Lampropeltis getula, or eastern kingsnake
  Lampropeltis
  - †Lampropeltis calligaster
  - †Lampropeltis getulus
- Lasiurus
  - †Lasiurus cinereus
- Lepisosteus
  - †Lepisosteus osseus
  - †Lepisosteus platostomus – tentative report
- Lepomis
  - †Lepomis cyanellus
  - †Lepomis humilis – or unidentified comparable form
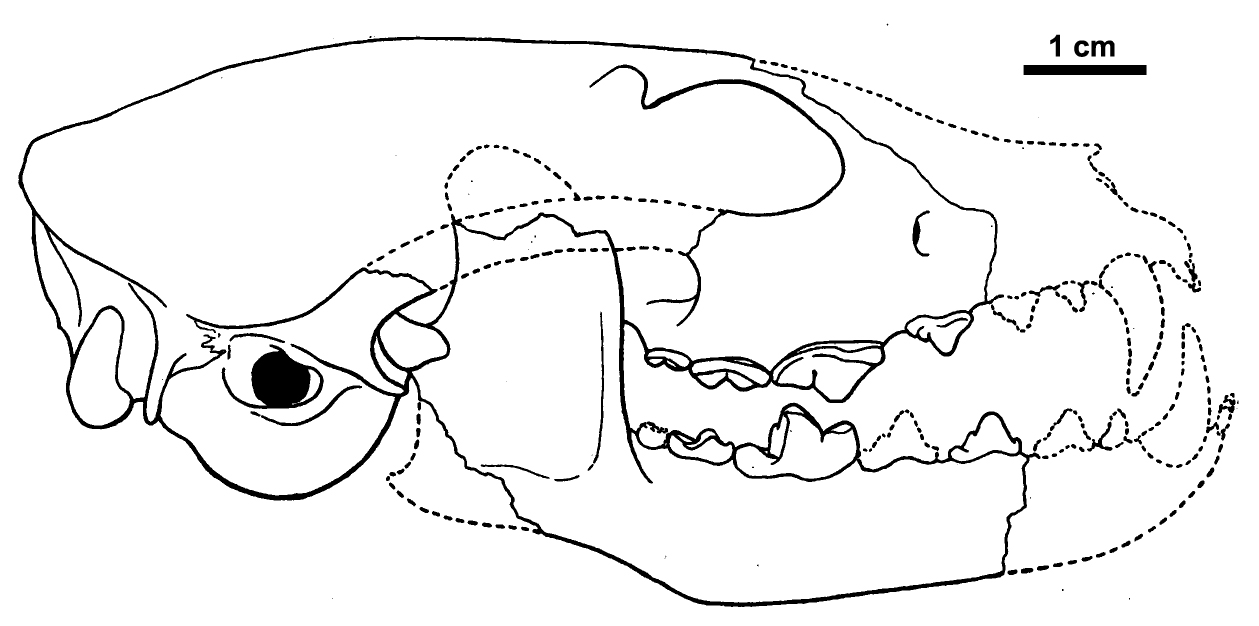
- Illustration of a fossilized skull of the Oligocene-Miocene dog Leptocyon
  †Leptocyon
- Lepus
  - †Lepus californicus – or unidentified comparable form
- †Longirostromeryx
- Lontra
  - †Lontra canadensis
- Lymnaea
- Lynx
- †Machairodus
- Macrochelys
  - †Macrochelys temminckii
- †Mammut
  - †Mammut americanum
- †Mammuthus
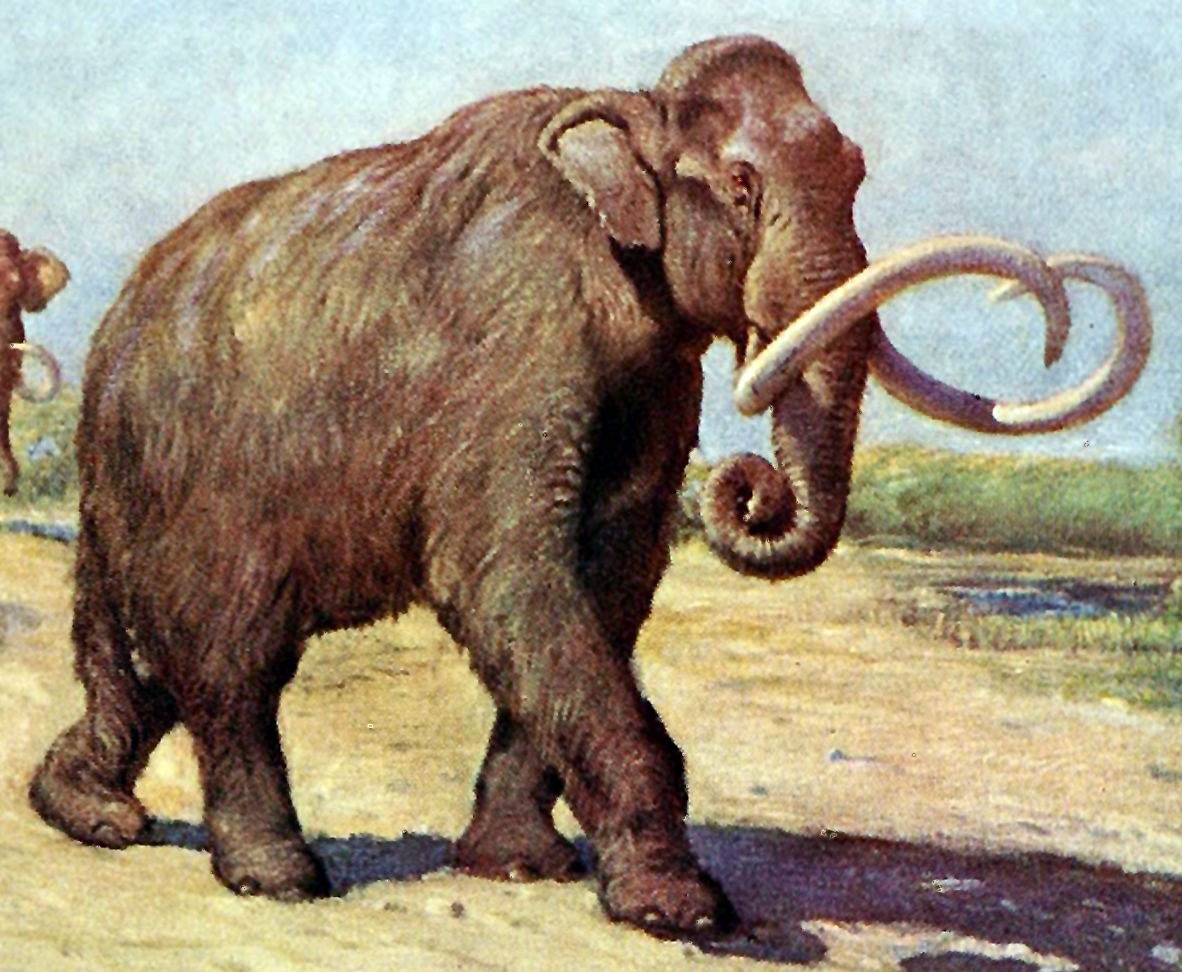
  - Life restoration of a herd of Mammuthus columbi, or Columbian mammoths. The extent of the fur depicted is hypothetical. Charles R. Knight (1909).
    †Mammuthus columbi
- Martes
- †Megalonyx
  - †Megalonyx jeffersonii
  - †Megalonyx leptostomus
- †Megantereon
- †Megatylopus
- †Menetus
- Mephitis
  - †Mephitis mephitis – tentative report
- †Merychyus
- Micropterus
  - †Micropterus punctulatus – or unidentified comparable form
- Microtus
  - †Microtus ochrogaster
  - †Microtus pennsylvanicus
- †Minytrema – tentative report
- Musculium
  - †Musculium transversum
- Mustela
  - †Mustela richardsonii – or unidentified comparable form
- †Mylagaulus
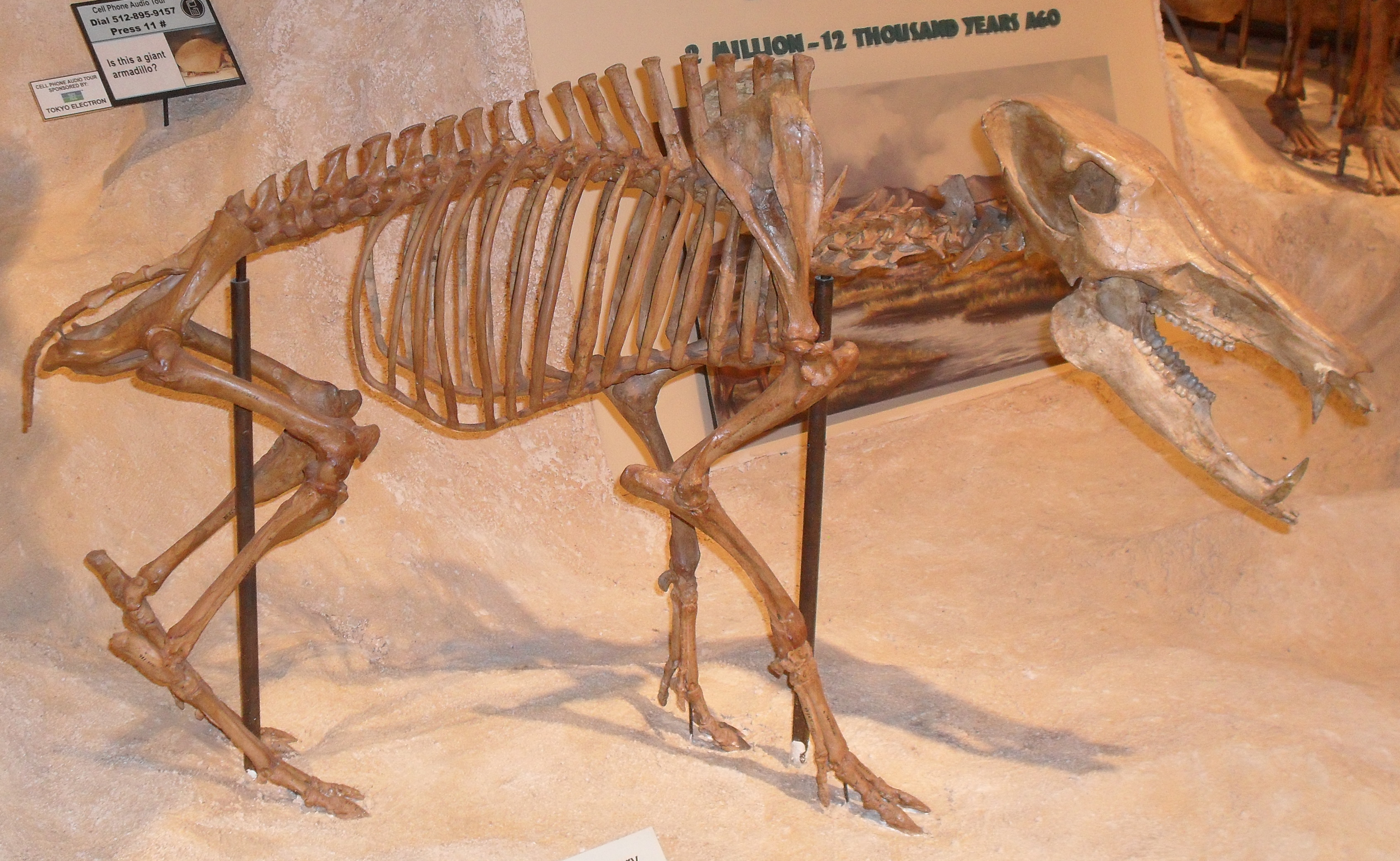
- Fossilized skeleton of the Pliocene-Holocene peccary Mylohyus
  †Mylohyus
  - †Mylohyus fossilis
- Myotis
- †Nannippus
- †Nassella
- Neofiber
- Neogale
  - †Neogale frenata – or unidentified comparable form
  - †Neogale vison
- †Neohipparion
- Neotoma
  - †Neotoma floridana – or unidentified comparable form
  - †Neotoma micropus
- Nerodia
  - †Nerodia sipedon
- Nesovitrea
- †Nimravides
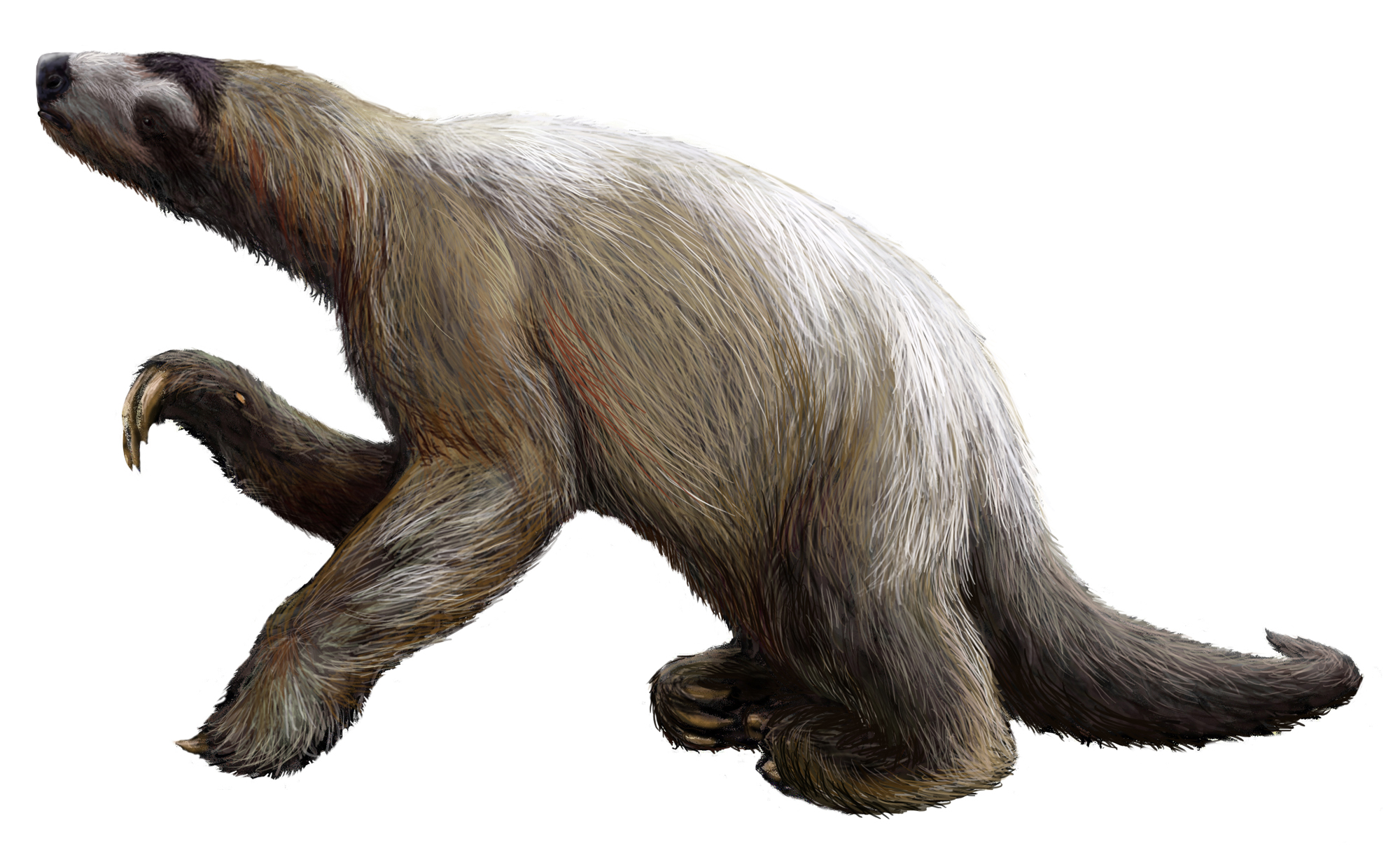
- Life restoration of the Pleistocene ground sloth Nothrotheriops
  †Nothrotheriops
- Notiosorex
  - †Notiosorex crawfordi
- †Notropis – tentative report
- Odocoileus
- Ondatra
  - †Ondatra zibethicus
- Onychomys
  - †Onychomys leucogaster – or unidentified comparable form
- Ophisaurus
  - †Ophisaurus attenuatus
- Ortalis
- Oryzomys
  - †Oryzomys palustris
- †Panicum
  - †Panicum elegans
- Panthera
  - †Panthera leo
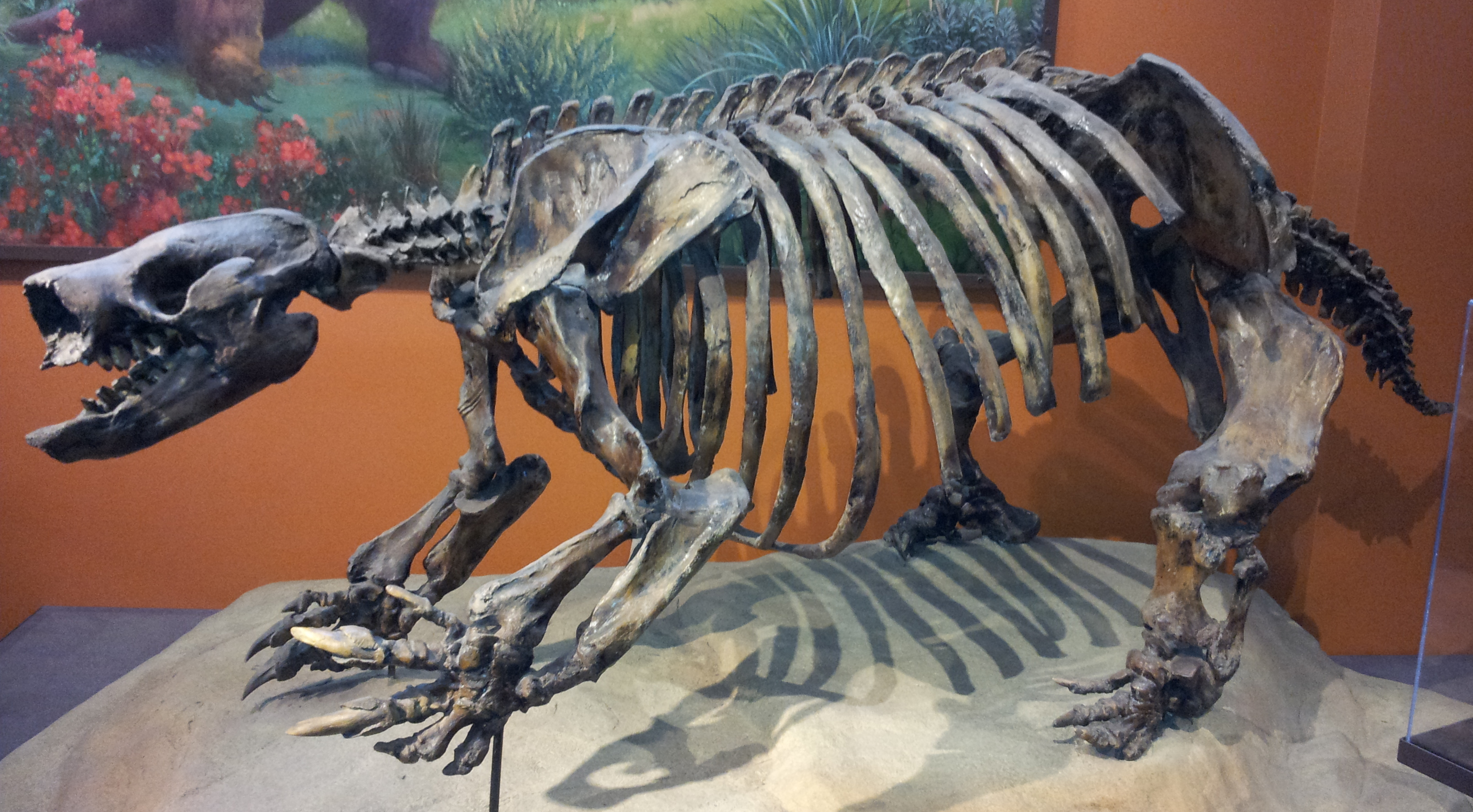
- Fossilized skeleton of the Pliocene-Pleistocene ground sloth Paramylodon
  †Paramylodon
  - †Paramylodon harlani
- †Pediomeryx
- †Peraceras
- Perca
  - †Perca flavescens
- Perognathus
- Peromyscus
- Phenacomys
  - †Phenacomys intermedius – or unidentified comparable form
- Phrynosoma
  - †Phrynosoma cornutum
- Physa
- Pisidium
- Pituophis
  - †Pituophis catenifer
  - †Pituophis melanoleucus
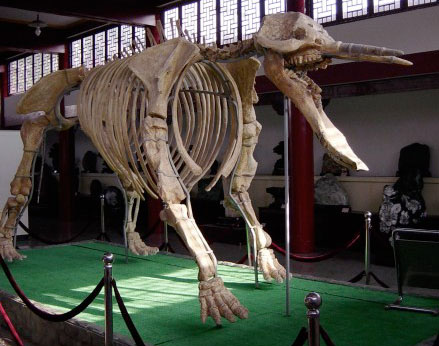
- Mounted fossilized skeleton of the Miocene elephant relative Platybelodon
  †Platybelodon
- †Platygonus
  - †Platygonus compressus – or unidentified comparable form
- Plegadis – or unidentified comparable form
- †Pleiolama
- †Plesiogulo
- †Pliohippus
- †Pomoxis
- †Potamocypris
- †Pratifelis
  - †Pratifelis martini – type locality for species
- †Procamelus
- †Procastoroides
- Procyon
  - †Procyon lotor
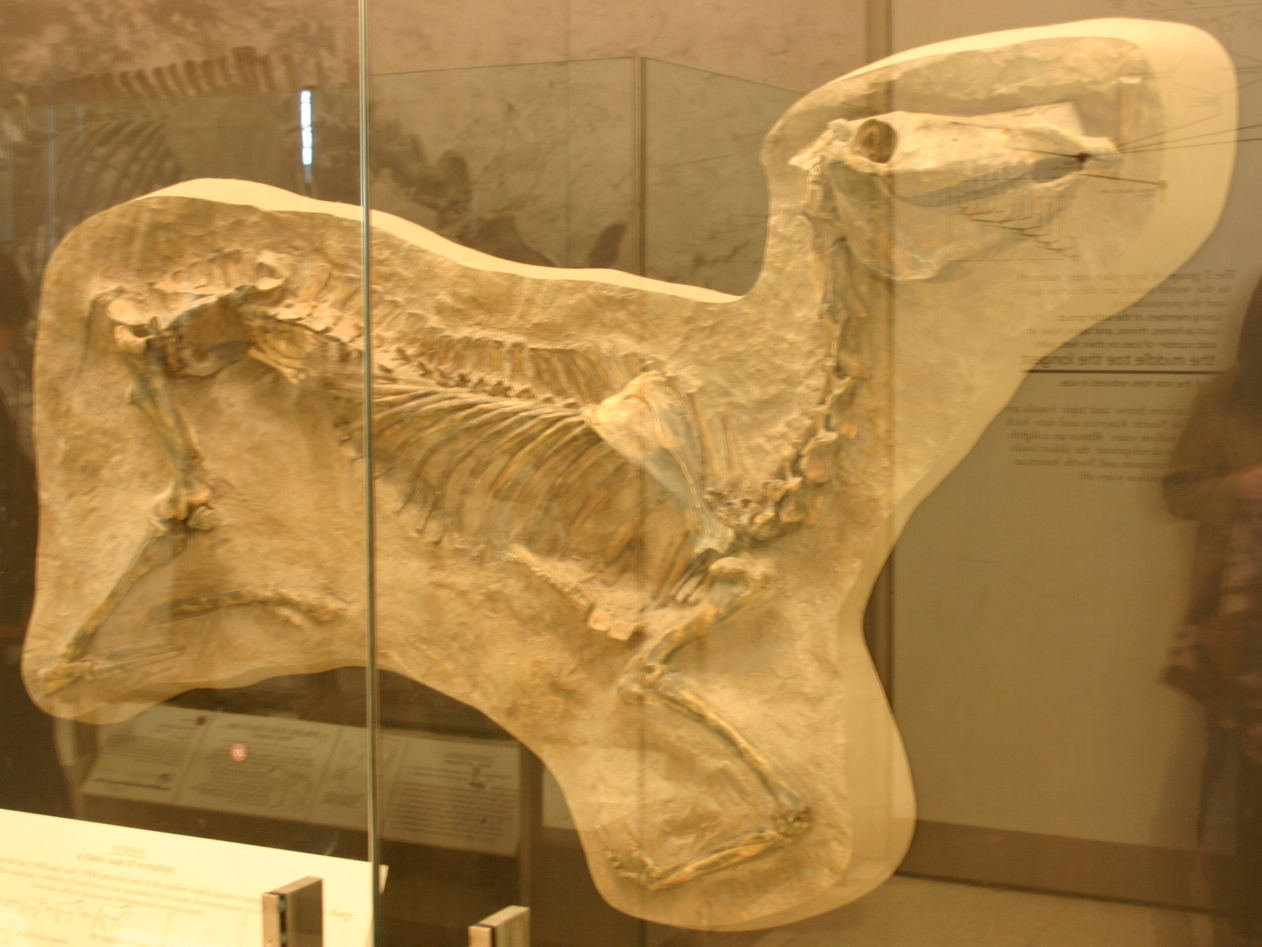
- Fossilized skeleton of the Miocene horse Protohippus
  †Protohippus
- †Protolabis
- Pseudacris
  - †Pseudacris triseriata
- Pseudemys
- †Pseudhipparion
- Puma
  - †Puma concolor
- Pupilla
- Pupoides
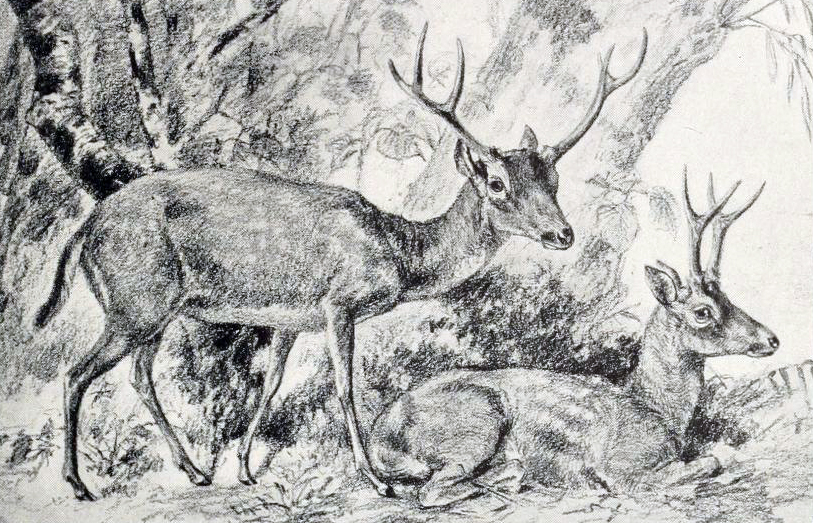
- Life restoration of the Miocene-Pliocene pronghorn Ramoceros and Cosoryx. Robert Bruce Horsfall (1913).
  †Ramoceros
- †Rana
  - †Rana areolata – or unidentified comparable form
  - †Rana catesbeiana
  - †Rana pipiens
- †Rana areolata – or unidentified comparable form
  - †Rana catesbeiana
  - †Rana pipiens
- †Regina
- Reithrodontomys
  - †Reithrodontomys humulis
  - †Reithrodontomys megalotis
  - †Reithrodontomys montanus – or unidentified comparable form
- Rhinocheilus – tentative report
  - †Rhinocheilus lecontei
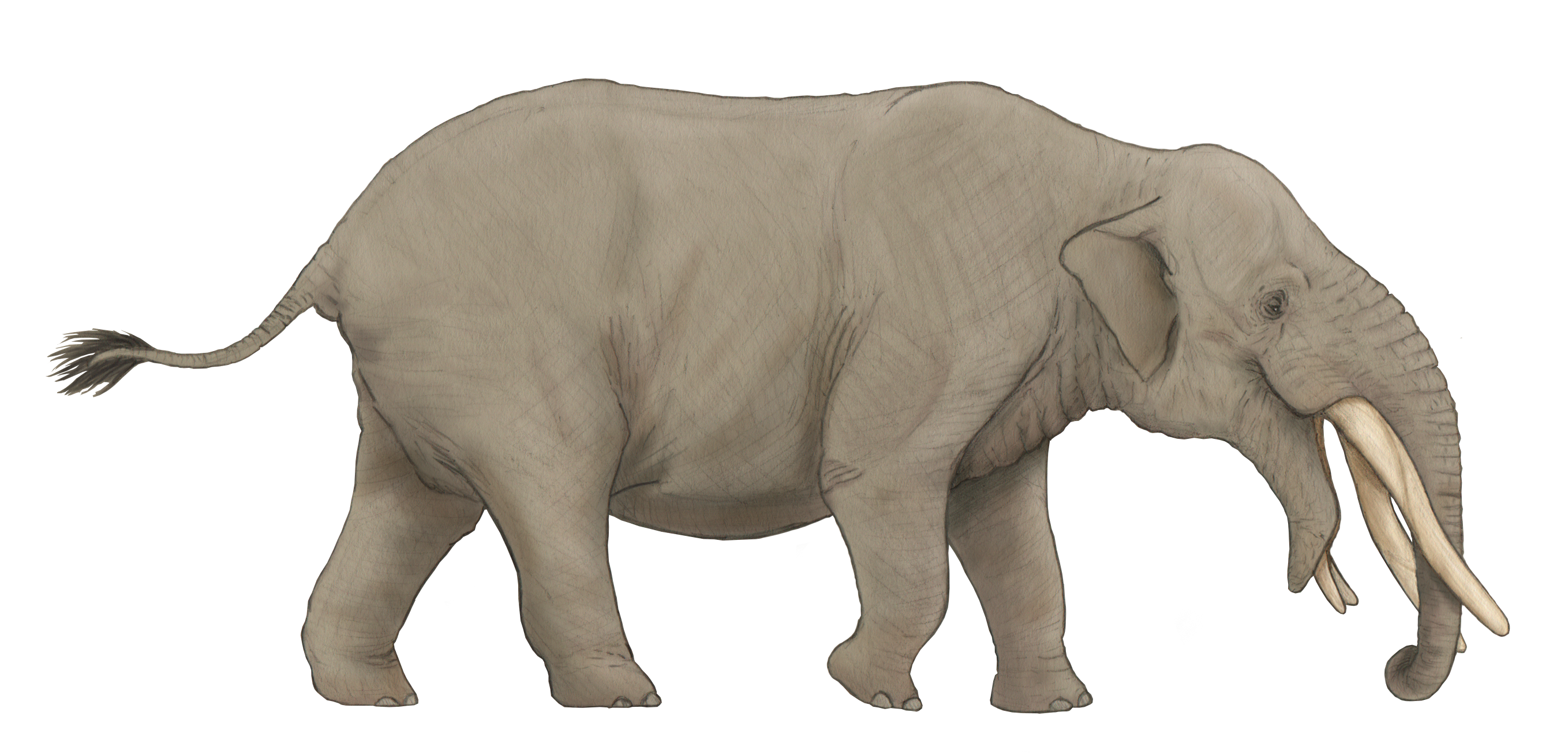
- Restoration of the Miocene-Pliocene elephant relative Rhynchotherium
  †Rhynchotherium
- †Satherium
  - †Satherium piscinarium
- Scalopus
  - †Scalopus aquaticus
- Scaphiopus
- Sceloporus
  - †Sceloporus undulatus
- †Semotilus
  - †Semotilus atromaculatus – or unidentified comparable form
- Sigmodon
- Sistrurus
  - †Sistrurus catenatus
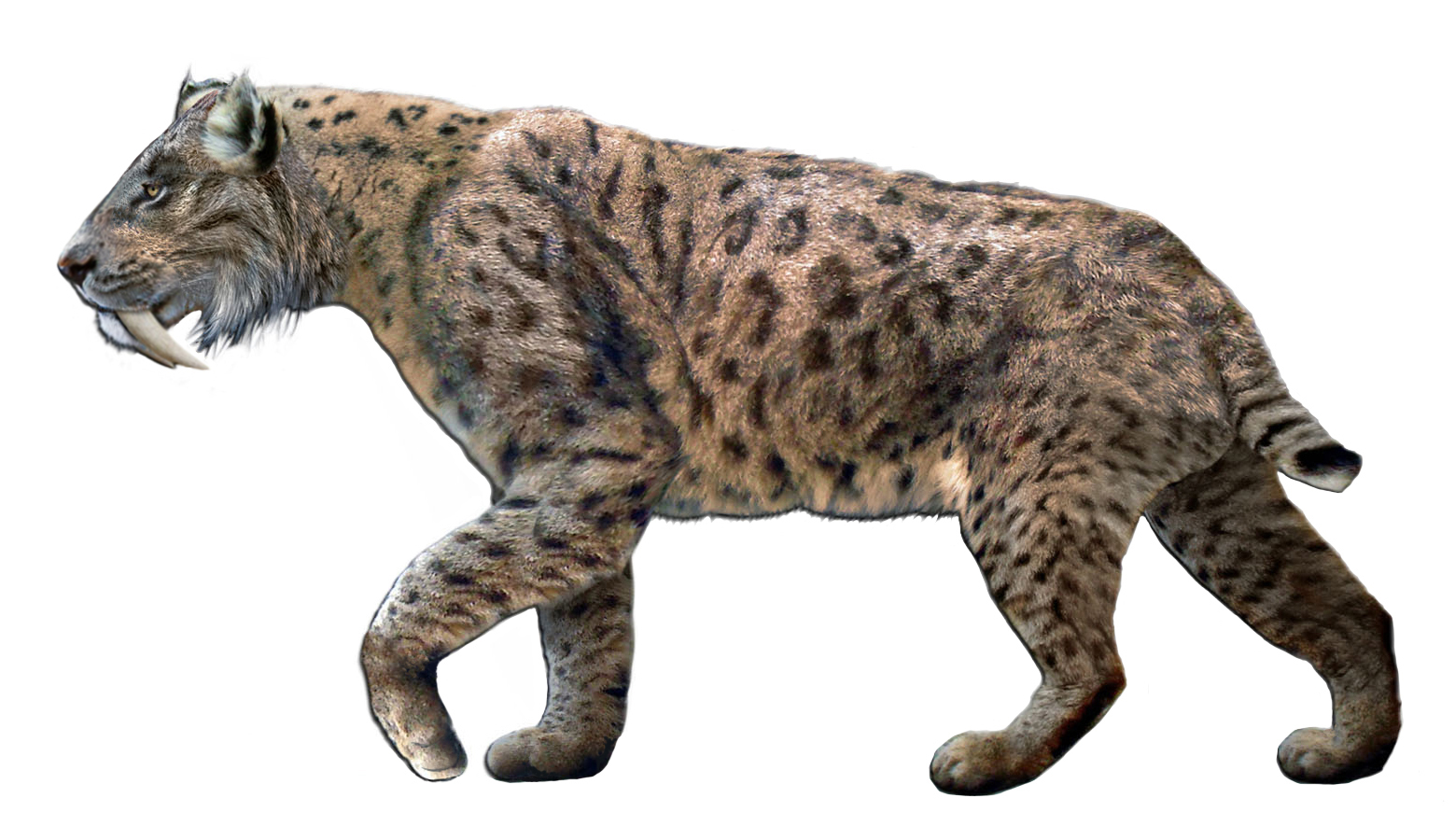
- Life restoration of the Pleistocene-Holocene saber-tooth cat Smilodon
  †Smilodon
- †Soergelia
  - †Soergelia mayfieldi – or unidentified comparable form
- Sorex
  - †Sorex arcticus
  - †Sorex cinereus
  - †Sorex palustris
- Spea
  - †Spea bombifrons
- Spermophilus
  - †Spermophilus franklinii – or unidentified comparable form
  - †Spermophilus richardsonii
  - †Spermophilus tridecemlineatus
- Sphaerium
- Spilogale
  - †Spilogale putorius
- Stagnicola
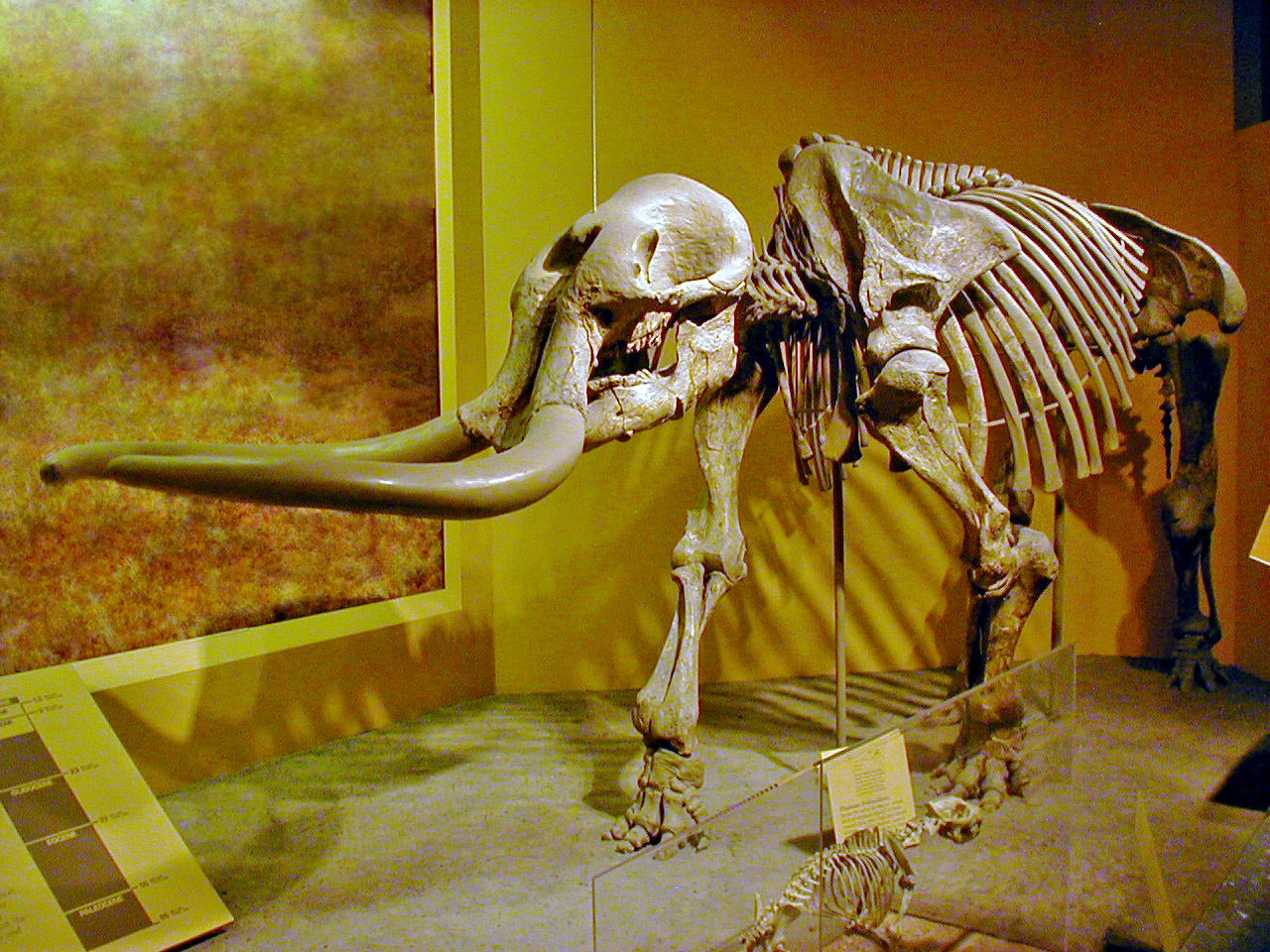
- Mounted fossilized skeleton of the Pliocene-Pleistocene elephant relative Stegomastodon
  †Stegomastodon
  - †Stegomastodon mirificus
- †Stenotrema
- Sternotherus
  - †Sternotherus odoratus
- Storeria
  - †Storeria dekayi – or unidentified comparable form
- Succinea
  - †Succinea ovalis
- Sylvilagus
  - †Sylvilagus floridanus
- Synaptomys
- Tapirus
  - †Tapirus veroensis
- Taxidea
  - †Taxidea taxus
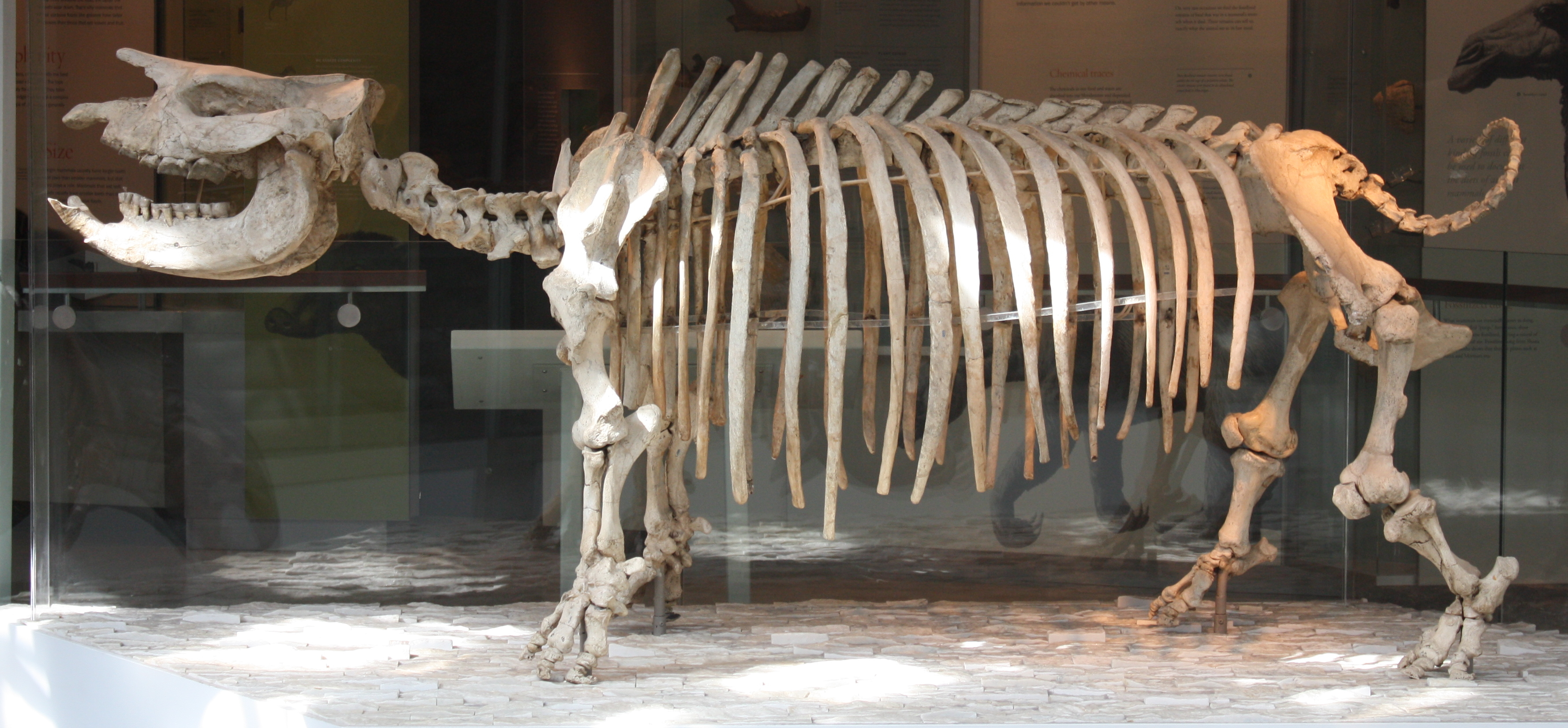
- Mounted fossilized skeleton of the Miocene-Pliocene rhinoceros Teleoceras
  †Teleoceras
- Terrapene
  - †Terrapene carolina
- Thamnophis
  - †Thamnophis proximus
  - †Thamnophis radix
  - †Thamnophis saurita – or unidentified comparable form
  - †Thamnophis sirtalis
- Thomomys
  - †Thomomys talpoides
- Trachemys
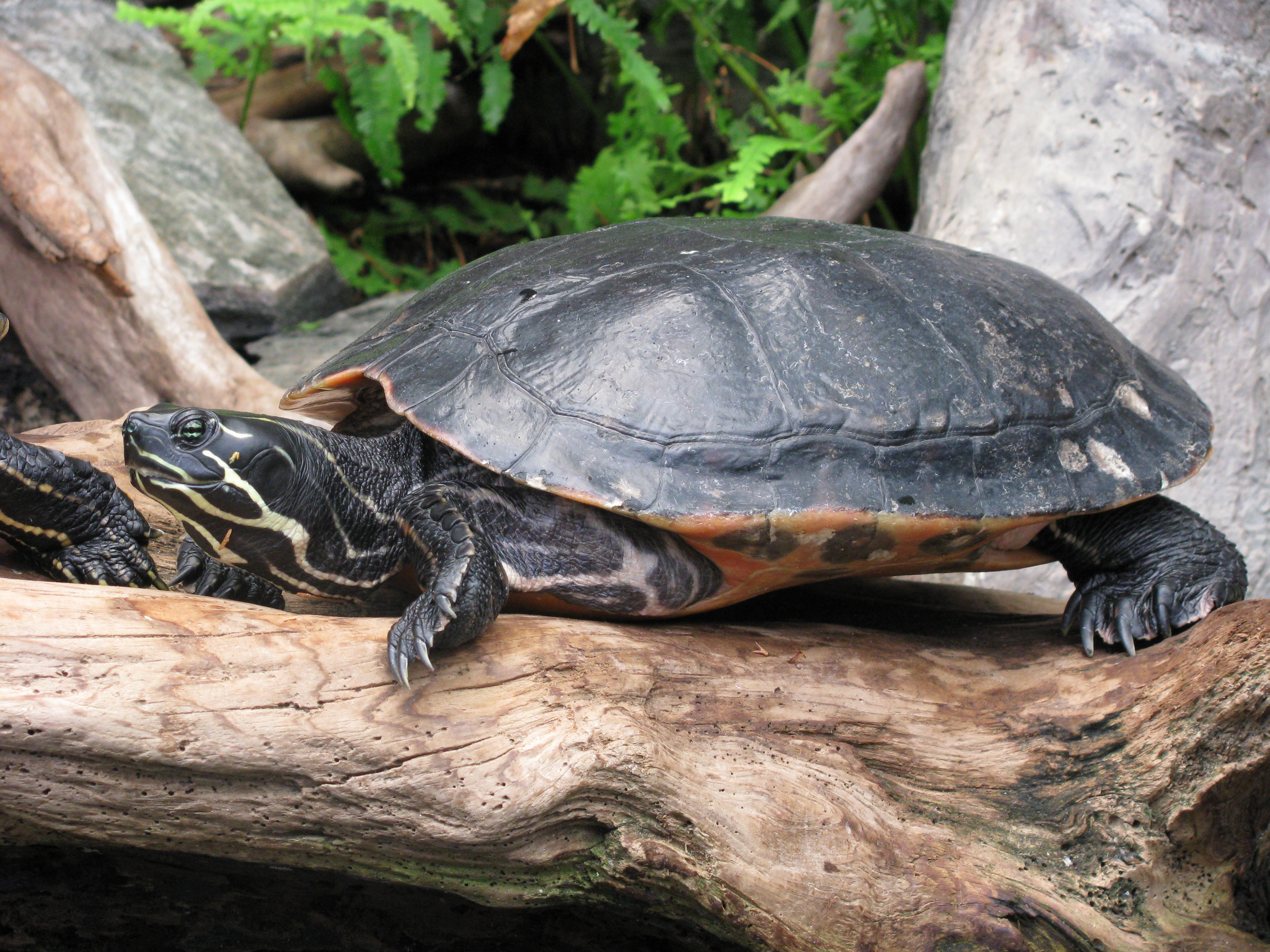
  - A living Trachemys scripta, or pond slider
    †Trachemys scripta
- †Trigonictis
  - †Trigonictis macrodon
- Trionyx
- Tropidoclonion
  - †Tropidoclonion lineatum
- Tympanuchus – or unidentified comparable form
- Urocyon
  - †Urocyon cinereoargenteus
  - †Urocyon progressus
- †Ustatochoerus
- Vallonia
  - †Vallonia gracilicosta
  - †Vallonia pulchella
- Valvata
  - †Valvata tricarinata
- Vertigo
  - †Vertigo ovata
- Vulpes
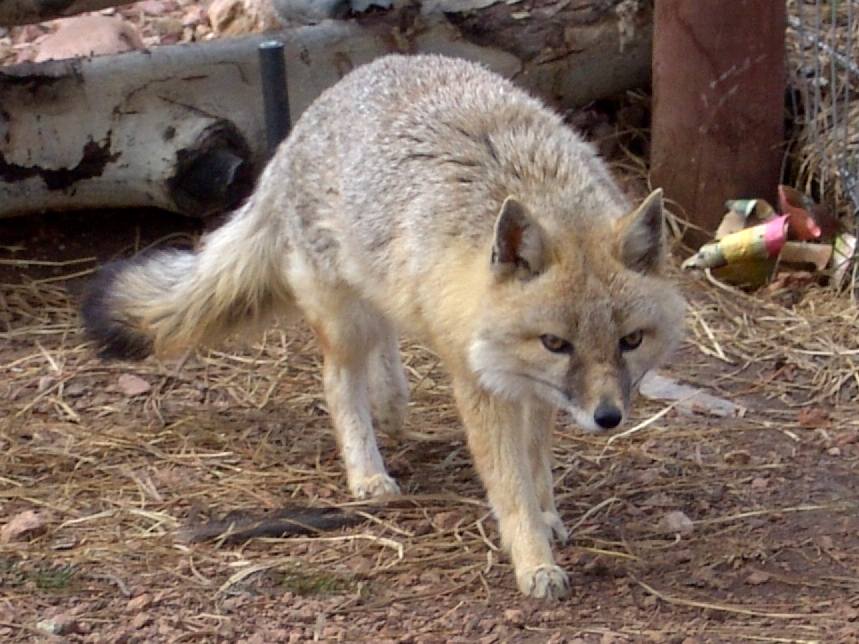
  - A living Vulpes velox, or swift fox
    †Vulpes velox
- Zapus
  - †Zapus hudsonius
- Zonitoides
  - †Zonitoides arboreus
  - †Zonitoides nitidus
