= Britannia (disambiguation) =

Britannia is the Latin name for Britain, used as the female personification of Britain.

Britannia may also refer to:

== Arts, entertainment and media ==
=== Fictional entities ===
- Britannia, an alias of character Sage in the Marvel Comics universe
- Britannia, a fictional location in Ultima video games
- Britannia, a fictional region of the manga and anime The Seven Deadly Sins
- The Holy Britannian Empire, a fictional political entity in the anime Code Geass

=== Games ===
- Britannia (board game), a strategy board game introduced in 1986

=== Literature ===
- Britannia (novel), a 2015 novel by Simon Scarrow
- Britannia (atlas), any one of three atlases of that name created in England the late 16th and mid 18th centuries, describing some or all of the British Isles.
  - Britannia (atlas)#Camden's Britannia Atlas made by William Camden (1551–1623)
  - Britannia (atlas)#Blome's Britannia Atlas made by Richard Blome (1635-1705)
  - Britannia (atlas)#Ogilby's Britannia Atlas made by John Ogilby (1600–1676)
  - Britannia Depicta, an illustrated road atlas for Britain, printed in numerous editions from 1720 into the 19th century, based on Ogilby's Britannia
- Britannia, a chorographical survey of Great Britain and Ireland by William Camden, 1586
- Britannia (atlas), a road atlas of England and Wales by John Ogilby, 1675
- Britannia, a series of novels by M. J. Trow and Richard Denham
- Britannia (journal), a journal of the Society for the Promotion of Roman Studies
- Britannia, a comic miniseries by Valiant Comics

=== Television ===
- Britannia documentaries, a BBC TV series
- Britannia (TV series), a 2018 historical fantasy drama

== Businesses and organizations ==
- Britannia Building Society, a British mutual building society 1856–2009
- Britannia Hotels, a British hotel group
- Britannia Industries, an Indian food-products corporation known for Britannia biscuits
- Britannia United Church, a United Church of Canada congregation in Ottawa, Canada

== Places ==
=== Canada ===
- Britannia, Calgary, a residential neighbourhood
- Britannia, Newfoundland and Labrador, a settlement in Trinity Bay
- Britannia, Ontario (disambiguation), several places in Ontario
  - Britannia, Ottawa, a group of neighbourhoods in Bay Ward
- Britannia Beach, an unincorporated community in British Columbia
- Britannia Range (Canada), a subrange of the North Shore Mountains
- Rural Municipality of Britannia No. 502, Saskatchewan
- Britannia Secondary School, Vancouver, British Columbia

=== France ===
- Brittany, a region in France sometimes called Little Britain to distinguish it from Britain

=== United Kingdom ===
- Britannia, the Roman province of Britain
- Britannia, Lancashire, a suburb of Bacup, Lancashire
  - Britannia railway station (1881–1917), a disused railway station
- Britannia, Richmond, London, a public house and Grade II listed building
- Britannia Bridge, over the Menai Strait in Wales
- Britannia Fields, a public open space near Britannia Road, Burbage, Leicestershire
- Britannia Royal Naval College, Dartmouth, Devon
- Britannia Park, replaced by The American Adventure Theme Park, Derbyshire
- Britannia Stadium, the former name of Bet365 Stadium, Stoke-on-Trent, Staffordshire

=== Other countries ===
- Britannia Range (Antarctica), a mountain range
- Mount Britannia, a mountain on Rongé Island, Graham Land, Antarctica
- Britannia Lake, NE Greenland
- Britannia Glacier, NE Greenland
- Britannia, Mauritius, a region in Savanne district, Mauritius
- Britannia railway station, Melbourne, a railway siding in Melbourne, Australia
- Britannia Village, a neighborhood of Taunton, Massachusetts, United States

== Sport ==
- Britannia Posen, a German association football club active c. 1909 – c. 1920
- FC Britannia XI, a Gibraltar futsal club
- INEOS Britannia, a British sailing team
- SV Britannia (Sport Vereniging Britannia), an association football club in Aruba
- Berliner Thor- und Fussball Club Britannia, a German football team, renamed Berliner SV 1892

== Transportation ==
=== Aircraft and airlines ===
- Bristol Britannia, an airliner built by the Bristol Aeroplane Company from 1952
- Britannia Airways, a UK-based charter airline 1961–2005

=== Cars ===
- Britannia (cyclecar), a British 4-wheeled vehicle 1913–14 by Britannia Engineering Co. Ltd.
- Bristol Britannia, a version of Bristol Type 603 1982–94

=== Ships ===
- Britannia (ship), the name of several ships
- HMS Britannia, the name of several Royal Navy warships
- SS Britannia, the name of several steamships
- HMY Britannia (Royal Cutter Yacht), a British royal racing yacht 1893–1936
- HMY Britannia, a British royal yacht 1954–97
- Britannia-class steamship, the Cunard Line's initial fleet of wooden paddlers from 1840

=== Steam engines ===
- Britannia, a GWR 3031 Class locomotive 1891–1915
- Britannia Class, BR Standard Class 7 steam locomotives for British Railways from 1951
  - BR Standard Class 7 70000 Britannia, the first Britannia Class steam locomotive
- Namaqualand 0-4-2T Britannia, a South African steam locomotive of 1905

== Other uses ==
- Acleris britannia, or Brittania Moth, a species of moth
- Britannia (coin), British bullion coins first issued in 1987
- Britannia metal, also called Britannia ware, a type of pewter alloy
- Britannia silver, an alloy of silver
- "Britannia", one of the Geographic Beanie Babies dolls

== See also ==
- Britain (disambiguation)
- Britannic (disambiguation)
- Britannica (disambiguation)
- British (disambiguation)
- Brittain (disambiguation)
- Brittany (disambiguation)
- Rule Britannia (disambiguation)
- Encyclopædia Britannica
- Britânia Sport Club, a former Brazilian football club
