= Britannica (disambiguation) =

Britannica is the Encyclopædia Britannica, a general knowledge English-language encyclopaedia.

Britannica may also refer to:

== Publications ==
- Biographia Britannica, a multi-volume biographical compendium
- Insecta Britannica Diptera, a seminal work of entomology by Francis Walker
- Malayalam Britannica, a reference work in the Malayalam language
- Monumenta Historica Britannica, an incomplete work by Henry Petrie, the Keeper of the Records of the Tower of London
- Musica Britannica, an authoritative national collection of British music
- Papyrus Larousse Britannica, a Greek language encyclopedia

== Other uses ==
- Classis Britannica, a provincial naval fleet of the navy of ancient Rome
- Encyclopædia Britannica, Inc., the publisher of the Encyclopædia Britannica
- Felis Britannica, the UK national sub-federation of the Fédération Internationale Féline
- Inula britannica, a plant species
- Pax Britannica, the period of relative peace in Europe and the world (1815–1914)
- Undichna britannica, a fish-fin, or fish-swimming fossil trackway left as a fossil impression on a substrate

== See also ==
- Britannia (disambiguation)
- Britannic (disambiguation)
- Pax Britannica (disambiguation)
- Britannicus (AD 41–AD 55), the son of the Roman emperor Claudius
