= Loxdale =

Loxdale may refer to:

- Loxdale, Wolverhampton, an area in Wolverhampton, England

- Loxdale tram stop

== People with the name ==
- Hugh Loxdale
