= Hodometer =

Hodometer may refer to:

- a dated term for odometer, a device for measuring distance travelled by a vehicle
- a surveyor's wheel, a device for measuring distance
