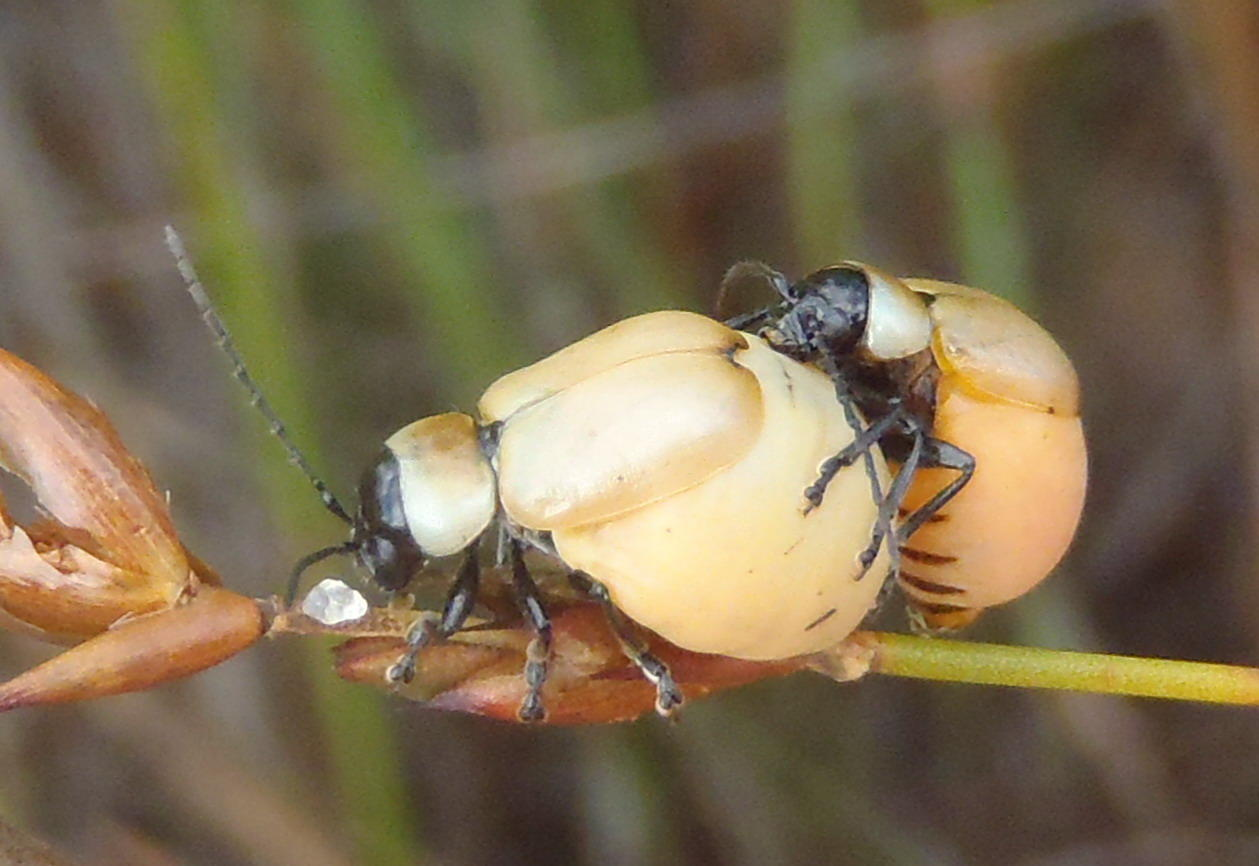

Scientific classification
- Kingdom: Animalia
- Phylum: Arthropoda
- Clade: Pancrustacea
- Class: Insecta
- Order: Coleoptera
- Suborder: Polyphaga
- Infraorder: Cucujiformia
- Family: Chrysomelidae
- Genus: Pseudorupilia
- Species: P. ruficollis

Binomial name
- Pseudorupilia ruficollis (Fabricius, 1775)

= Pseudorupilia ruficollis =

Restio Beetle

Species of beetle

Pseudorupilia ruficollis aka as the Swollen Restio Beetle is a member of the Chrysomelidae family. Pseudorupilia (Jacoby, 1893) resembles the Australian genus Rupilia (Clark, 1864) whence its generic name. It is known only from South Africa and is strongly associated with the Cape fynbos, feeding on the pollen of Restionaceae, Proteaceae and Asteraceae.

== Description ==
Cryptocephalus ruficollis, Fabr.

The type of this species, described from the Banks' collection, is contained in the British Museum; an examination of the specimen proves it to belong to the Galerucinae, and not to Cryptocephalus at all. Olivier has described the species also, referring it rightly (not wrongly, as Suffrian says) to that of Fabricius. The habitat of the insect is given as St. Helena; some time ago I received from the Museum at Cape Town another specimen, and obtained at the latter place, so that it remains somewhat doubtful whether St. Helena is another locality for the insect : the Cape Town specimen agrees entirely with the type in the Banks' collection, which must find its place in a new genus allied to Rupilia and allied genera. The original specific name of 'ruficollis', altered by Edgar von Harold (1830–1886) to 'erythrodera', can therefore be restored, although the thorax in the type, and in my specimen, is more flavous than rufous. The following is the diagnosis of the genus, and the description of the species

Flavous; the head, antennae, scutellum, the legs, sides of the breast, and the base of the abdominal segments, black; thorax and elytra finely punctured. Length, 2 3/4 lines. Head broad and robust, black, impunctate, transversely grooved between the eyes, the frontal elevations trigonate, nearly contiguous; clypeus transversely raised; labrum flavous; mandibles robust and elongate; antennae black, the first joint short and thick, the second very short, the third and fourth joints as long as the first, the following four joints, shorter, the rest broken off; thorax twice as broad as long, constricted at the middle, the sides strongly rounded, the anterior angles distinct, the posterior ones obsolete, the surface very minutely punctured, flavous, the middle of the disc stained with fulvous; scutellum broader than long, black; elytra widened posteriorly, their apex broadly rounded, the surface finely punctured and wrinkled; under side flavous; the sides of the breast, the legs, and a transverse band at the base of each abdominal segment, black.

— Martin Jacoby in The Entomologist, 1893
