= Monographia Chalciditum =

Book by Francis Walker

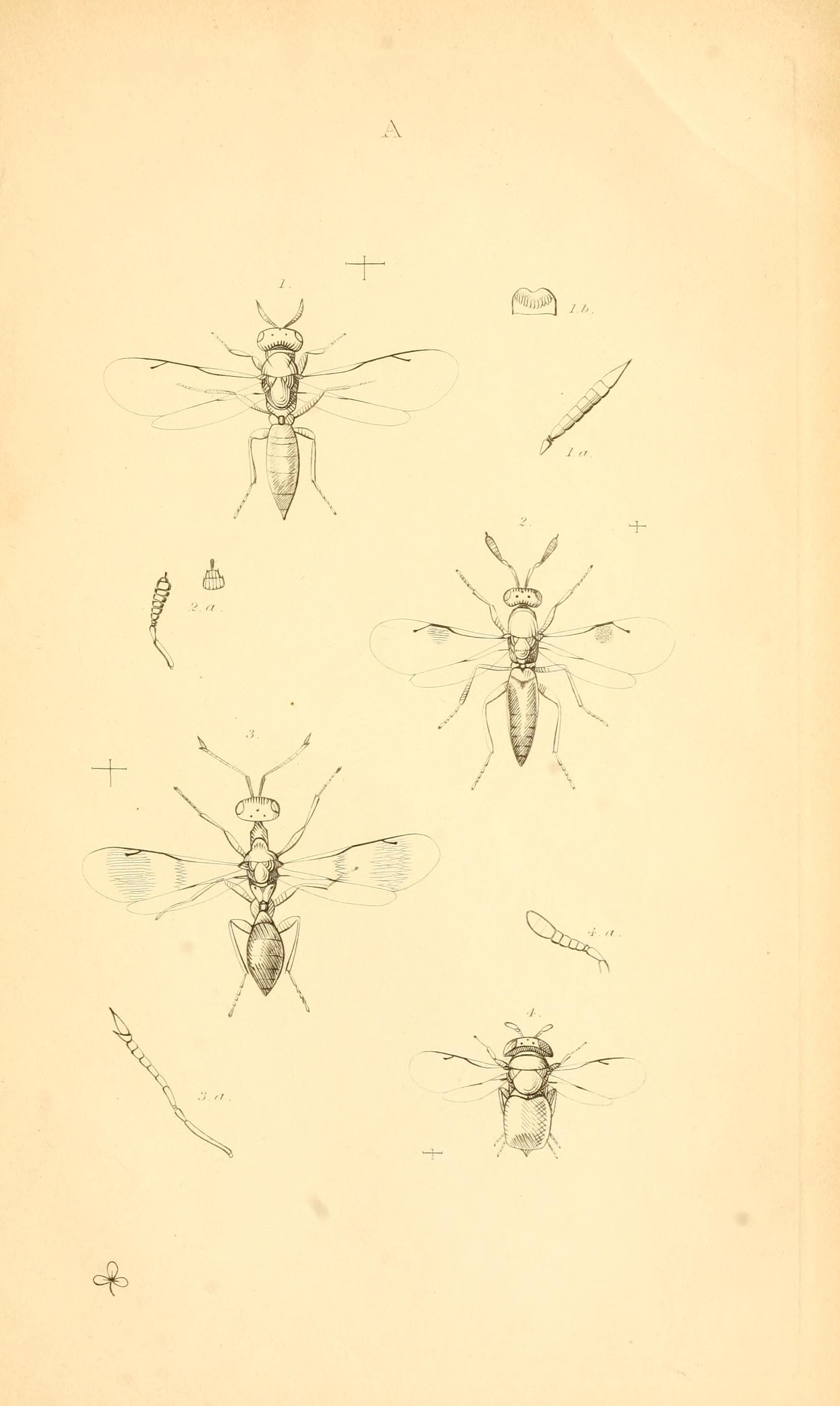
Monographia Chalciditum Plate A

Monographia Chalciditum by Francis Walker, published in two volumes in 1839, was a founding work of entomology, introducing new genera of chalcidoid Hymenoptera later to be ranked as families. The work is a compilation of descriptions published in the Entomological Magazine. In its preparation Walker used descriptions provided by the Irish entomologist Alexander Henry Haliday.

The work is monographic in the sense that it includes amplified descriptions of the genera and species of previous authors and new species descriptions, thereby presenting a complete account of what was then known of the "Chalcidites". Works examined and cited are by : the German entomologist and zoologist Johann Karl Wilhelm Illiger, the Swedish physician and naturalist Johan Wilhelm Dalman, the Italian Entomologist Maximilian Spinola and the English entomologists John Obadiah Westwood and John Curtis. The descriptions required the collection, study and often the dissection of a large number of specimens.

The parts were:

- 1833. Monographia chalcidum (continued from page 384). Entomol. Mag. 1(5): 455–466.
- 1834. Monographia chalciditum (continued from p. 39). Entomol. Mag. 2(2): 148–179.
- 1834. Monographia chalciditum (continued from p. 309). Entomol. Mag. 2(4): 340–369.
- 1835. Characters of some undescribed New Holland Diptera. Entomol. Mag. 2(5): 468–473.
- 1835. Monographia chalciditum (continued from p. 369). Entomol. Mag. 2(5): 476–502.
- 1835. Monographia chalciditum (continued from Vol. II., page 502.). Entomol. Mag. 3(1): 94–97.
- 1836. Monographia chalciditum (continued). Entomol. Mag. 3(5): 465–496.
- 1838. Descriptions of British chalcidites. Ann. Mag. Nat. Hist. (1)1(4): 307–312.
- 1838. Descriptions of British chalcidites. [continuation from p. 312] Ann. Mag. Nat. Hist. (1)1(5): 381–387.

The work is thus divided:

- 1839. Monographia Chalciditum. Volume 1. Balliere, London. 333 pp.
- 1839. Monographia Chalciditum. Volume 2. Balliere, London. 100 pp.

== Publication details ==
Monographia Chalciditum was published by Hypolitus Balliére (1809–1867), 219, Regent Street, London, Jean-Baptiste Ballière, (1797–1885) 13, Rue d' École de Médecine, Paris and by J. and G. Weigel, Leipsig (Leipzig, Germany) in 1839. The Ballière family published mainly French medical works but through tradition, since many early doctors and pharmacists studied botany, natural history works. Also in 1839 Balliére published Haliday's Hymenoptera Britannica : Alysia at London. It is doubtful that the financially adept Balliére brothers funded either- Monographium Chalciditum was the continuation of a series of papers in the Entomological Magazine, the style of which, may have led to its downfall.

== Content and subsequent works ==
Volume 1

Subtitled, poetically "the green, myriads in the peopled grass" volume 1 of Monographia is a singularly dry work consisting of descriptions only. It covers new English, Irish and French species. Two more parts were published in the Annals and Magazine of Natural History under the title Descriptions of British chalcidites. Following the Balliére volumes chalcids were described in only one more volume of Annals and Magazine of Natural History and that of 1846. Thereafter, the British Museum, Walkers employer, published, Walker's 100 page List of the specimens of hymenopterous insects in the collection of the British Museum. Printed by order of the Trustees, London. vi + 237 pp. Part I-Chalcidites;100 pages.

Volume 2

Part I In this Walker describes "species collected by C. Darwin Esq. These are from Australia :-Hobart's Town, Van Diemen's Land, King George Sound and Sydney, New South Wales; Part II Bahia, Brazil; Part III Chiloe; Part IV Charle's Island, Galapagos; Part V New Zealand; Part VI Jame's Island, Part VII St. Helena, high central land.

Walker briefly corresponded with Darwin. The first letter, written in 1838, thanks Darwin for improving his descriptions of species by indicating localities and remarks that, with few exceptions the Chalcidites of South America and Australia are remarkably like European species. The second letter, written in December, 1843, tells Darwin that most of his chalcids were all similar to European species or genera, but other species were quite different from those known from Europe.

The 15 Plates illustrating some of the species in volume 1 are by Haliday (A- P -there is no plate I) were published in The Entomologist Volume 1 between November 1840 and October 1842.
