= Britannic =

Britannic means 'of Britain' or 'British', from the Roman name for the British.

Britannic may also refer to:

== Arts and entertainment ==
- Britannic (film), a 2000 film based on the story of HMHS Britannic
- SS Britannic, a fictional ocean liner in the 1974 movie Juggernaut

== Ships ==
- SS Britannic (1874), holder of the Blue Riband, owned by the White Star Line
- SS Britannic (1888 Michigan), a wooden freighter that operated on the Great Lakes
- SS Britannic (1888 Norway), a cargo vessel sunk in 1917
- HMHS Britannic, owned by the White Star Line and third sister ship of RMS Olympic and RMS Titanic, sank in 1916 after hitting a German naval mine
- MV Britannic, a motor liner owned by the White Star Line and then Cunard Line, scrapped in 1960

== Other uses ==
- Britannic (typeface), a sans-serif typeface sold by Stephenson Blake

== See also ==
- Britannia (disambiguation)
- Britannica (disambiguation)
- Britannicus (41–55 AD)
