= Undichna =

Undichna Temporal range: Silurian – ?

Trace fossil classification
- Ichnogenus: Undichna; Anderson, 1976

Ichnospecies
- †Undichna bina Anderson 1976; †Undichna britannica Higgs, 1988; †Undichna consulca Higgs, 1988; †Undichna insolentia Anderson, 1976; †Undichna radnicensis Turek, 1989; †Undichna simplicitas Anderson, 1976

Undichna is a fish-fin, or fish-swimming fossil trail left as a fossil impression on a substrate, or the opposite impression on an overlying substrate; this type of fossil is an ichnofossil, in this case a specific ichnogenus, Undichna; the term "undichna" is composed of the words: 'und'–'ichna', for "wave-trace".

At present, the oldest known Undichna were made by cephalaspids, that only had presumptive motion scenarios, due to the physiological form of the cephalaspids as predating the teleosts, (bony fishes). The trails are from the border of England and Wales, from 400 mya, in an ancient riverbed environment.

== See also ==
- Lateral undulation, a type of undulation for fish, sea animals, and snakes
- Trace fossil
- Fossil trackway
