= Burbage, Leicestershire =

Village and civil parish in Leicestershire, England

Coordinates: 52°31′38″N 1°20′54″W

Burbage
- Village and civil parish
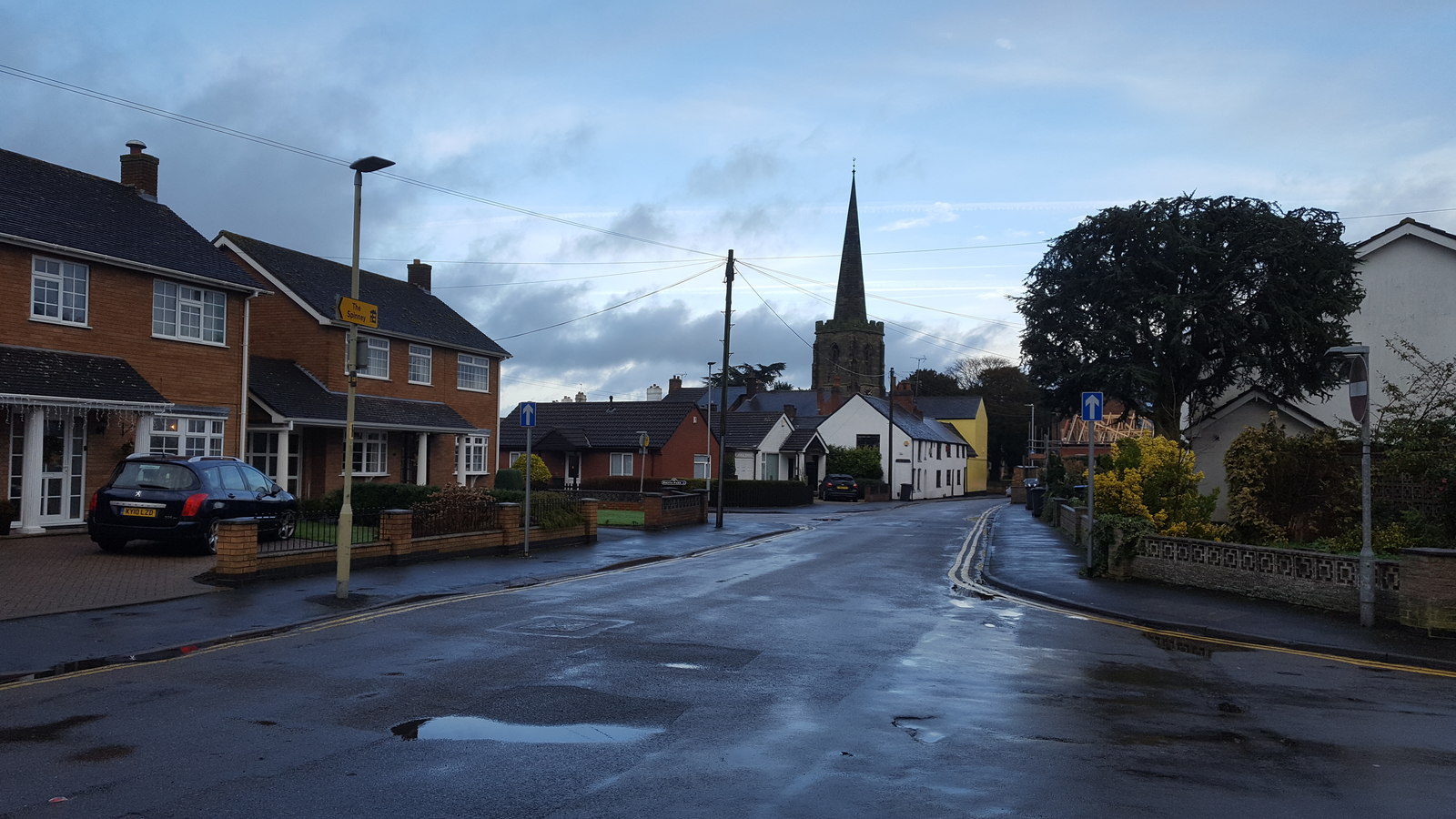
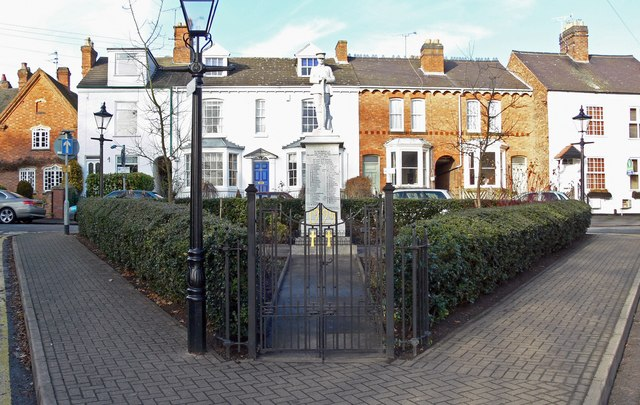
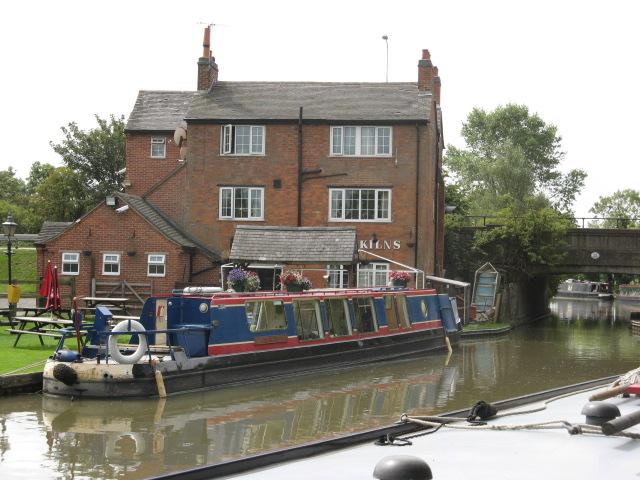
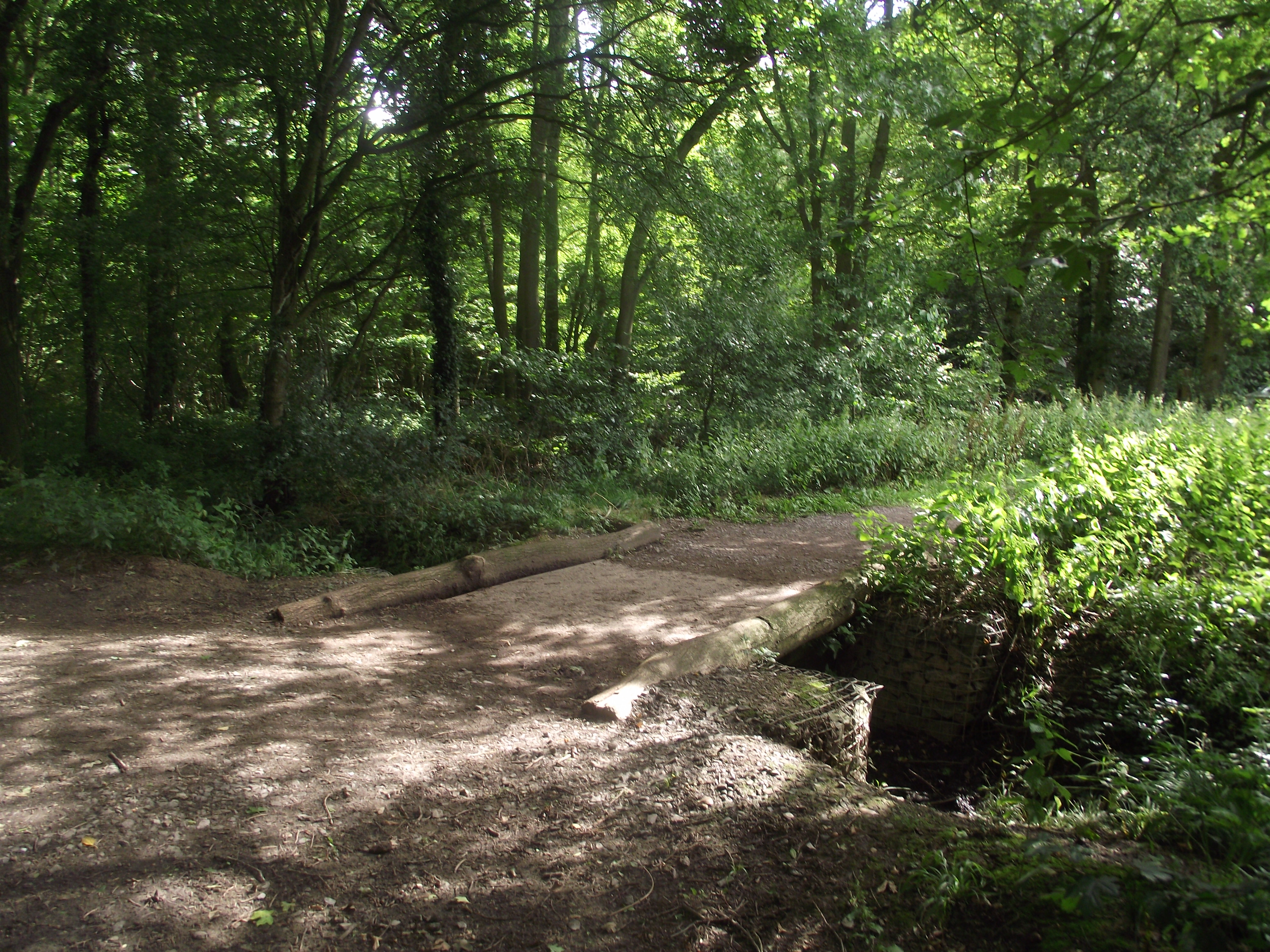
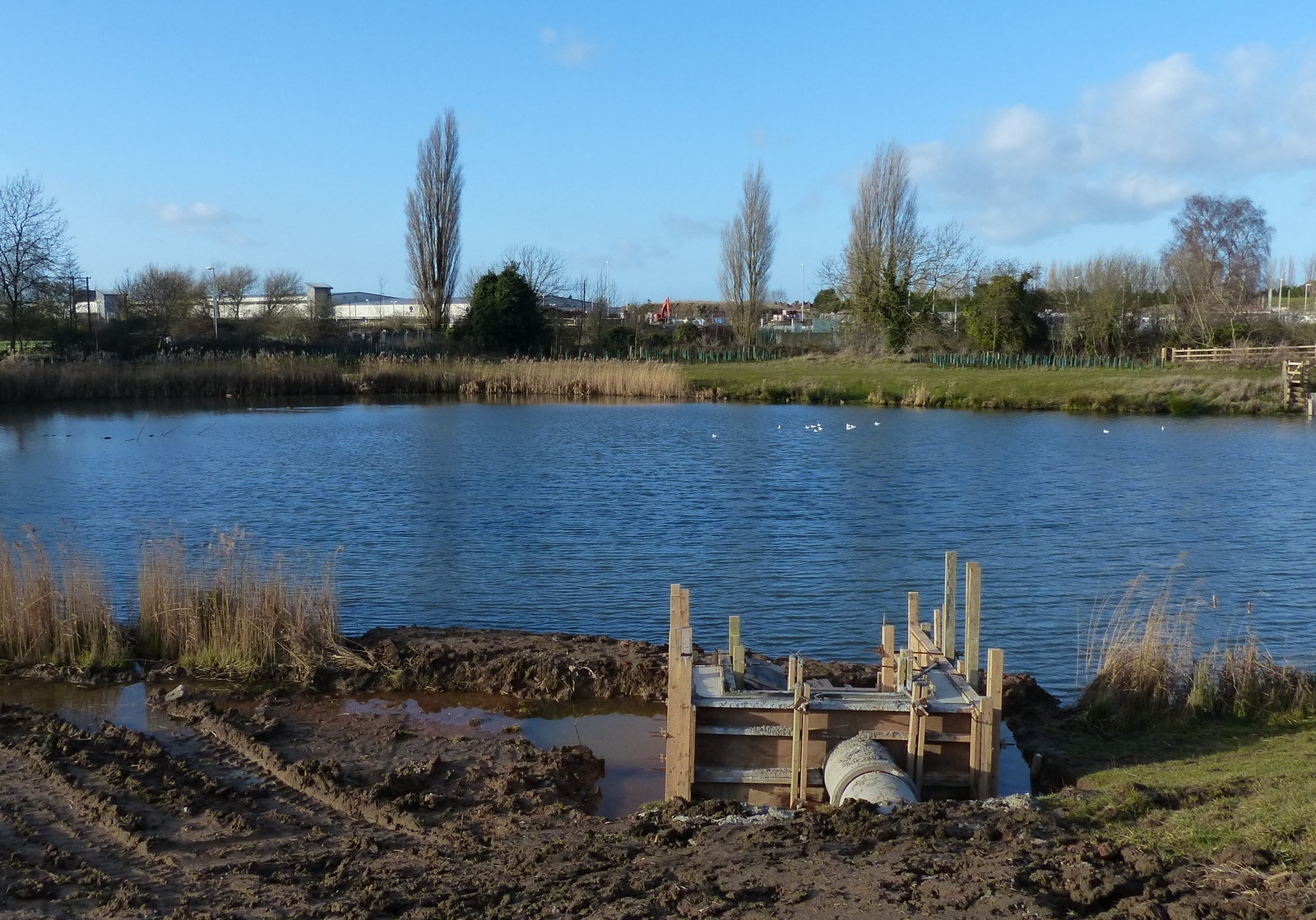
- Top to bottom, left to right: Burbage Parish Church and village scene, War Memorial, Wood, Brookfield Road Lake & Lime Kilns

- Location within Leicestershire
- Population: 16,510 (Parish Ward); 50,712 (Urban Area with Hinckley)
- OS grid reference: SP425939
- Civil parish: Burbage
- District: Hinckley and Bosworth
- Shire county: Leicestershire
- Region: East Midlands
- Country: England
- Sovereign state: United Kingdom
- Areas of the village: List: Burbage St Catherines and Lash Hill (Ward); Burbage Sketchley and Stretton (Ward); Lash Hill; Leicester Grange; Sketchley; St Catherine's; Stretton; Tilton
- Post town: HINCKLEY
- Postcode district: LE10
- Dialling code: 01455
- Police: Leicestershire
- Fire: Leicestershire
- Ambulance: East Midlands
- UK Parliament: Hinckley and Bosworth

Burbage is a large village and civil parish, now generally considered as a southern suburb of the neighbouring town of Hinckley. It is in the Borough of Hinckley and Bosworth in Leicestershire, England, near the border with Warwickshire.

== History ==
The village's name means 'valley/brook with a fortification'.

Leofric, Earl of Mercia, gave the village of Burbage to Coventry Abbey in 1043. At that time it was valued at two shillings. By the time of the Domesday Book in 1086, its value had risen to £4. There were 1¼ hides of land (around 150 acres (0.61 km^{2})) with two ploughs. Twenty villagers held two smallholdings, with two slaves and eight ploughs. Burbage also had a meadow, measuring a furlong in length and width (about 40,500 square metres). The village also owned woodland half a league by four furlongs (2.2 square kilometres).

In 1564 the diocesan returns show a population of 57 families within Burbage and six at Sketchley. Burbage, for many centuries a small farming community, remained very thinly populated. In the census of 1801 there were 1098 inhabitants. It was not until the twentieth century that the population exceeded 2000.

During the English Civil War the village's proximity to Hinckley drew it to the attention of raiding parties from the local parliamentary garrisons in north Warwickshire. A list of claims submitted by the constables of Burbage and Sketchley to the Warwickshire county committee, in June 1646, reveals that Captain Flower's troop from the Coventry garrison took twenty strikes of provender valued at £1, sent off to Stoney Stanton, and availed themselves of free quarter worth £18.10. Captain Willington's cornet from the Tamworth garrison took a mare, saddle and bridle from John Watkin, while Captain Willington's soldiers took a horse worth £5 from Thomas Bodington.(SP28/161)

Burbage was also the birthplace, in 1608, of John Cook. Cook went on to become Solicitor-General of the Commonwealth of England and lead the prosecution of King Charles I for High Treason, resulting in Charles' execution and, ultimately, his own.

George Canning, Prime Minister in the year he died 1827, lived from 1811 at Burbage, where he took up residence in a house along Church Street, which in later years the house would become ‘Burbage Constitutional Club’.

By 1953, the population had risen to 3,983, and by 1958 there were more than 5,000 on the electoral roll; this rapid growth was largely due to the expansion of Sketchley Hill housing estates.

In 2001 the population of Burbage was 14,324.

== Parish council ==
Burbage Parish Council

Type
- Type: Parish council

Leadership
- Chairman: Councillor DC Bill MBE
- Vice Chairman: Councillor R Hoelmer

Structure
- Seats: 20
- Political groups: Liberal Democrats (20)

Elections
- Last election: 2023

Meeting place
- Burbage Millennium Hall, Britannia Rd, Burbage, Hinckley LE10 2HF

Website
- Official website

Footnotes
- All Liberal Democrats

Burbage Parish Council is the parish council of Burbage. The parish council is split into five local wards which include:

- Lash Hill
- Sketchley
- St Catherine's
- Stretton
- Tilton

=== Current composition ===
Group affiliation	Members
Liberal Democrats	20
Total	20

=== Election history ===
Burbage Parish Council is made up of 20 councilors and five wards. The last election for the council was in 2023. It is all made up of Liberal Democrats.

== People ==
The leading barrister and judge Ann Curnow QC was born here, and so was the mathematician R. Cotes (1682–1716).

== Burbage today ==
Burbage is effectively a suburb of the larger urban area of Hinckley, having been incorporated officially in the Hinckley Urban District in 1936. The old Burbage village is now a small part of a large parish which also includes Sketchley Village and some large and small residential estates. It is considered by some to be a commuter location for large parts of Leicestershire, Warwickshire and the West Midlands. This is probably due to the fact it is less than a mile from the M69 motorway (which links that M6 to the M1) and the A5.

Burbage has a small library which was threatened with closure in 2015, due to a cost-cutting strategy by the county council. In 2016, a group of community volunteers from the area were successful in submitting plans to take control of the running of the library. The group also gained CIO (charitable incorporated organisation) status and have since made improvements to the library's facilities.

Burbage Community Arts Festival (BCAF) is held annually in May over a period of two weeks. BCAF is a registered charity run by volunteers. The festival provides opportunities for members of the community young and old to participate in and enjoy various aspects of the performance, visual and literary arts including opportunities in music, dance, painting and sculpture. BCAF also brings professional entertainment to the community in the form of drama, music, comedy and theatre. The Festival first began in 1998 and has been staged successfully every year since.

There is a primary school, an infant school, a junior school and a high school. The 1st Britannia Scout Group (which includes Beaver Scout, Cub Scout, Scout and Explorer Scout sections) on Britannia Fields, There is a farmers market every first Saturday of the month running 9:00 am to 1:00 pm.

The nearest railway station is Hinckley which is about 1.5 miles (2.4 km) from Burbage centre, on the boundary between Burbage and Hinckley.

A yearly summer street carnival and fete is organised by the Burbage Carnival Committee, whose purpose is to raise funds to donate to local good causes. This has been a very popular community event and has raised over 1/2 million pounds for good causes. The carnival committee also runs the Burbage Bonfire and Fireworks Display held on Britannia Fields – all to support local charities.

The Freestyle Burbage community events project, a crowdsourced and crowdfunded programme of events organised and run by local residents, was started in 2013 by residents in the Sketchley Hill and Lash Hill area. It folded in 2018 due to lack of support.

The highest rank local football team is called FC Burbage who play at various venues around the village. Mini soccer through to open age and veterans football are teams who play for this large grass root club, founded in 2011 by 3 local dads wanting to provide a safe and fun game for local children. The club is still Chaired by one of the original 3 founders, with growing team numbers for both boys, girls men and women to all get involved. With over 350+ players this is a large grass roots club..

== Burbage Common and Woods ==
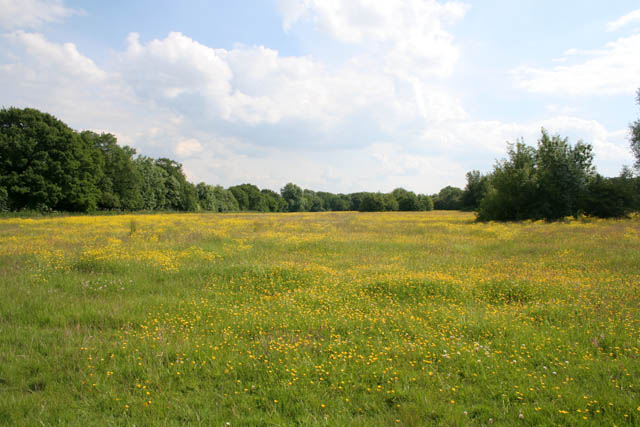

Burbage Common and Woods are in the northeast corner of the Parish. This is a country park run by Hinckley & Bosworth Borough Council. Its history as a grazing area dates back to at least the Domesday Book of 1086. It is now a 200-acre (0.81 km^{2}) park popular with, amongst others, birdwatchers, walkers and horseriders. It is free to enter and is open dawn to dusk every day.
