= Rule Britannia (disambiguation) =

Rule Britannia may refer to:

- Rule, Britannia!, a British patriotic song
- Rule Britannia (painting), a 1910 painting by Spencer Gore
- Rule Britannia (novel), by Daphne du Maurier (1972)
- Rule Britannia (TV series), a documentary series 2009–2015

== See also ==
- Britannia (disambiguation)
- "Cool Britannia", a song on Gorilla (Bonzo Dog Doo-Dah Band album) of 1967
- Cool Britannia, a term applied to some aspects of British popular culture in the 1990s
- Fool Britannia, a hidden camera sketch series on British TV network ITV, premiered in 2012
- "Rue Britannia", a 1960–61 story arc in the animated TV series Rocky and His Friends
- Ruled Britannia, an alternate history novel from 2002 by Harry Turtledove
