= Pax =

Pax or PAX may refer to:

== Peace ==
- Peace (Latin: pax)
  - Pax (goddess), the Roman goddess of peace
  - Pax, a truce term
- Pax (liturgy), a salutation in Catholic and Lutheran religious services
- Pax (liturgical object), an object formerly kissed as a substitute for the Kiss of Peace in the Catholic Mass

== Entertainment ==
- Pax (1994 film), a Portuguese comedy
- Pax (2011 film), a Norwegian-Swedish drama
- PAX (event), or Penny Arcade Expo, a gaming convention
- Pax (novel), by Sara Pennypacker
- Pax, a fictional organization in Strange New World and elsewhere by Gene Roddenberry
- PAX, a side project of the German band X Marks the Pedwalk
- Pax (album) by Andrew Hill
- Pax TV, which became Ion Television in 2007
- Pax Armata, a fictional private military company in the game Battlefield 6

== Organizations ==
- Pax Christi International, an international Catholic peace movement
- PAX Association, in Poland
- Pax Forlag, a Norwegian publishing house
- PAX Network, a US television network now known as ION Television
- Pax World Funds, a US mutual fund company
- Pax Labs, a US manufacturer of vaporizers and the Juul electronic cigarette
- Pax, a Russian manufacturer of Ferris wheels and other amusement rides
- Pax Dei: the European Middle Ages Peace and Truce of God movement, an early movement toward addressing and reducing war crimes

== Science and technology ==
- pax (command), a command line program to read and write file archives
- PaX, a Linux kernel security patch introduced in 2000
- Pax genes, a group of genes and their proteins
- Michelin PAX System, an automotive run-flat tire system
- Pax, a generic brand of diazepam available in South Africa
- Pax (spider), a genus of ant spiders
- auxiliary unit of measurement for the number of passengers in public transportation, shipping and aviation, for guests in the hotel industry and for visitors to events

== People ==
- Ferdinand Albin Pax (1858–1942), German botanist
- Ferdinand Albert Pax (1884–1964), German zoologist, son of the previous

== Other uses ==
- 679 Pax, a minor planet orbiting the Sun
- Winter Storm Pax, a 2014 storm in the US
- Name of one of the months of the ancient Maya calendar

== See also ==
- List of periods of regional peace, enforced by a dominant power
- Pax Hill, a house in England
- Pax Pamir, a board game set in 19th century Afghanistan
- Pax Romana (disambiguation)
- Pax Britannica (disambiguation)
- Pax Indica (disambiguation)
- Pack (disambiguation)
- Peace (disambiguation)
