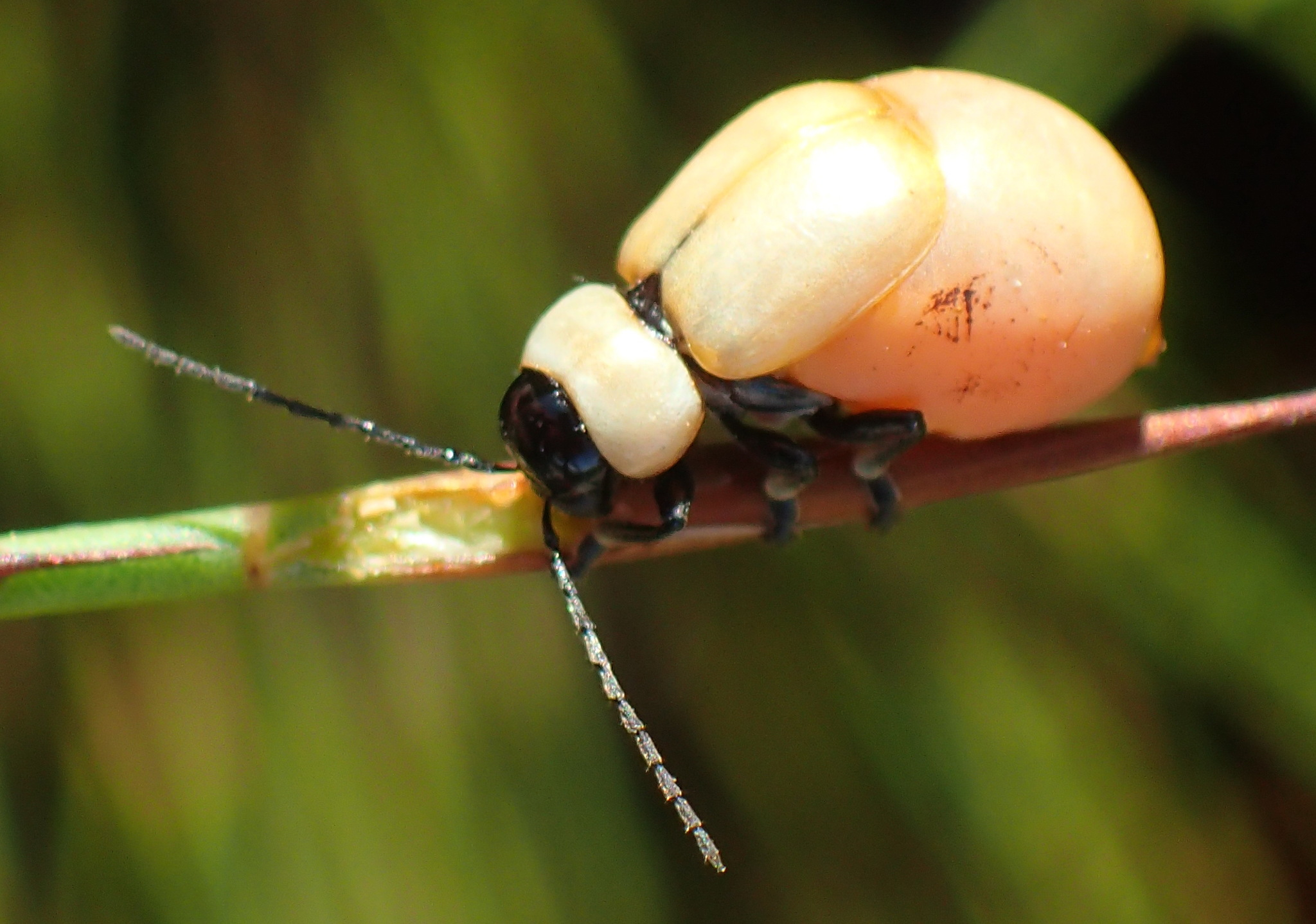
- Pseudorupilia ruficollis, South Africa

Scientific classification
- Kingdom: Animalia
- Phylum: Arthropoda
- Clade: Pancrustacea
- Class: Insecta
- Order: Coleoptera
- Suborder: Polyphaga
- Infraorder: Cucujiformia
- Family: Chrysomelidae
- Subfamily: Galerucinae
- Tribe: Luperini
- Subtribe: Luperina
- Genus: Pseudorupilia; Jacoby, 1893

= Pseudorupilia =

Genus of leaf beetles

Pseudorupilia is a genus of swollen restio beetles in the family Chrysomelidae. There are about nine described species in Pseudorupilia. They are found in sub-Saharan Africa.

== Species ==
These nine species belong to the genus Pseudorupilia:

- Pseudorupilia bicostata (Allard, 1889)
- Pseudorupilia careo Grobbelaar, 1995
- Pseudorupilia chera Grobbelaar, 1995
- Pseudorupilia grobbelaarae Beenen, 2016
- Pseudorupilia inconspicua (Jacoby, 1906)
- Pseudorupilia ruficollis (Fabricius, 1775)
- Pseudorupilia sepia Grobbelaar, 1995
- Pseudorupilia sexlineata (Fabricius, 1781) (six-lined leaf beetle)
- Pseudorupilia sola Grobbelaar, 1995
