= Pax Indica =

Pax Indica (Latin for "Indian Peace") may refer to:

- Pax Indica: India and the World of the Twenty-first Century, a 2012 non-fiction book about Indian foreign policy by Shashi Tharoor
- Pax Kushana, a social and economic peace in the regions under the Kushan Empire between 2nd and 4th centuries AD
- Pax Gupta, a period of peace in India in the 4th-5th centuries AD under the Gupta empire

== See also ==
- Pax (disambiguation)
- Indica (disambiguation)
- Pax Britannica (disambiguation)
- Pax Romana (disambiguation)
