= Pax Romana (disambiguation) =

The Pax Romana was a time of peace established by Emperor Augustus during the Roman Empire.

Pax Romana may also refer to:

- Pax Romana: War, Peace and Conquest in the Roman World, 2016 book by historian Adrian Goldsworthy
- Pax Romana (1511), a treaty concluded in Rome in 1511 between Pope Julius II and the Roman Baronial families
- Pax Romana (comics), a comic book created by Jonathan Hickman
- Pax Romana (organization), an international federation of Catholic students and academics
- "Pax Romana" (Sanctuary), a season three episode of Sanctuary
- Pax Romana, a monetary unit in The Secret World, an online game
- Anno 117: Pax Romana, 2025 video game in Anno series

== See also ==
- Pax (disambiguation)
- Romana (disambiguation)
- Pax Britannica (disambiguation)
- Pax Indica (disambiguation)
