= Entomological Magazine =

Publication about entomology

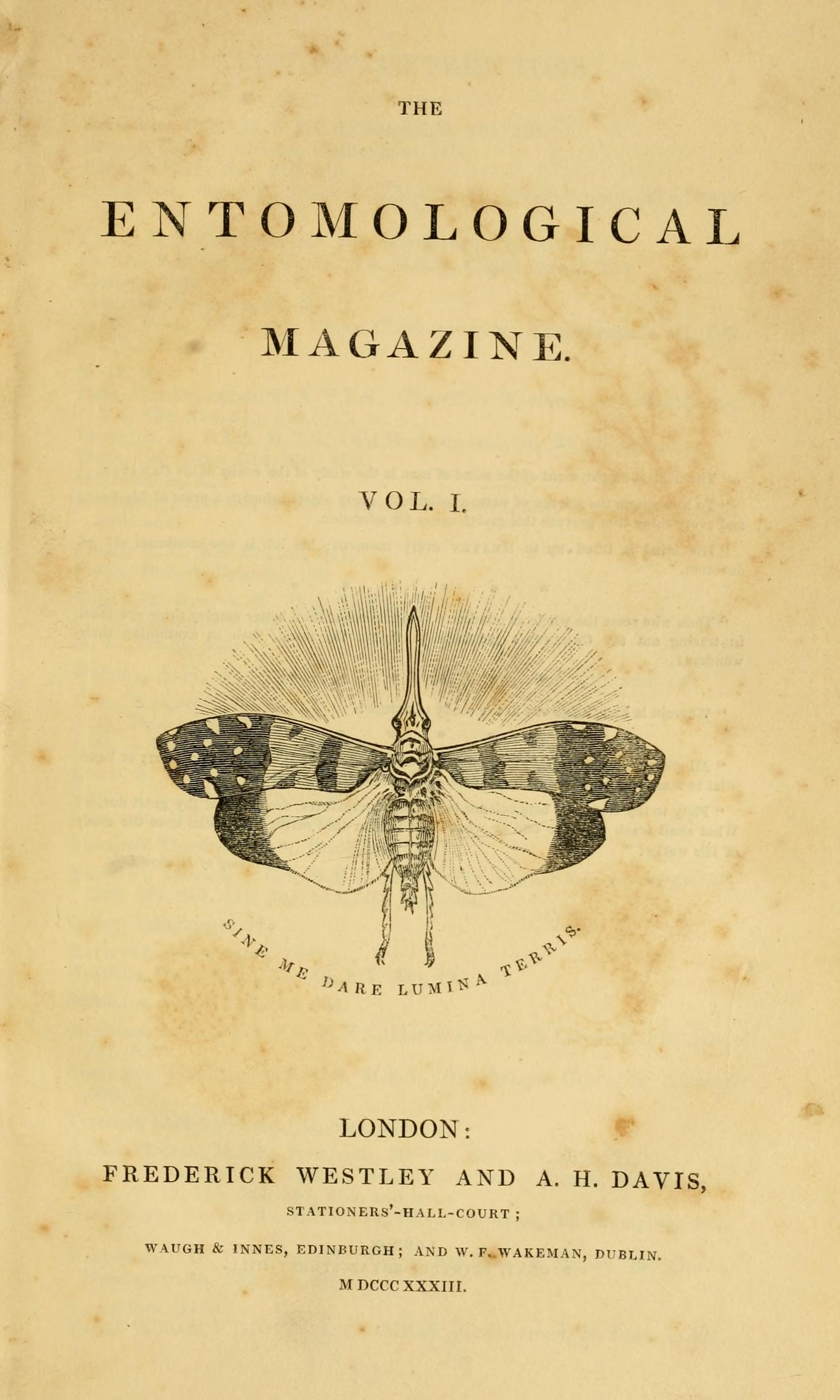
The cover of the first volume of the Entomological Magazine

The Entomological Magazine was a publication devoted to entomology.

The Entomological Magazine was published between September 1832 and October 1838 by the Society of Entomologists of London. The editor was Edward Newman aided by Francis Walker.The work includes reviews of entomological literature, articles and systematic papers in which new species are described. Contributors include John Curtis, Edward Doubleday ("Communications on the Natural History of North America."), Alexander Henry Haliday (notably An essay on the classification of the parasitic Hymenoptera... of Britain which correspond with the Ichneumones minuti of Linnaeus), George Robert Waterhouse, John Obadiah Westwood, William Swainson, Francis Walker ( notably Monographia Chalciditum ), George Thomas Rudd, William Edward Shuckard, James Charles Dale, James Francis Stephens and Frederick William Hope

The Entomological Magazine was discontinued following controversy. Newman writes a "Valedictory Address" in Volume 5.

== The Entomologist ==
The Entomological Magazine was succeeded by The Entomologist published in London by Edward Newman between 1840 and [1869] in four volumes:

- Volume 1 November 1840-October 1842;
- Volume 2 May 1864-December 1865;
- Volume 3 January 1866-November 1867;
- Volume 4 January 1868-December 1869.

This in turn was succeeded by Newman's Entomologist published by Simpkin, Marshall & Co. at London [1869-1876] and from that date until 1973 (volume 106) as, once more, The Entomologist. Around World War I, it was edited by Richard South. He died in 1932, but the journal continued publication until 1973 (volume 107). In 1989 it was revived, under the editorship initially of Hugh Loxdale, and then of B.O.C.Gardener. It ceased publication with volume 111 in 1992.
