= Pax Britannica (disambiguation) =

Pax Britannica was a period of relative peace in Europe 1815–1914.

Pax Britannica may also refer to:

- Pax Britannica, the title of the middle volume of the Pax Britannica Trilogy by British author Jan Morris
- Pax Britannica, the title of a 1949 book by the British writer and commentator F. A. Voigt
- Pax Britannica, a novel in the series by Abaddon Books
- Pax Britannica, the 1991 album of the London industrial music group Test Dept
- Pax Britannica, a 1985 board wargame by Greg Costikyan

== See also ==
- Pax (disambiguation)
- Britannica (disambiguation)
- Pax Romana (disambiguation)
- Pax Indica (disambiguation)
