= Britannia (atlas) =

1675 atlas of most major routes in England and Wales

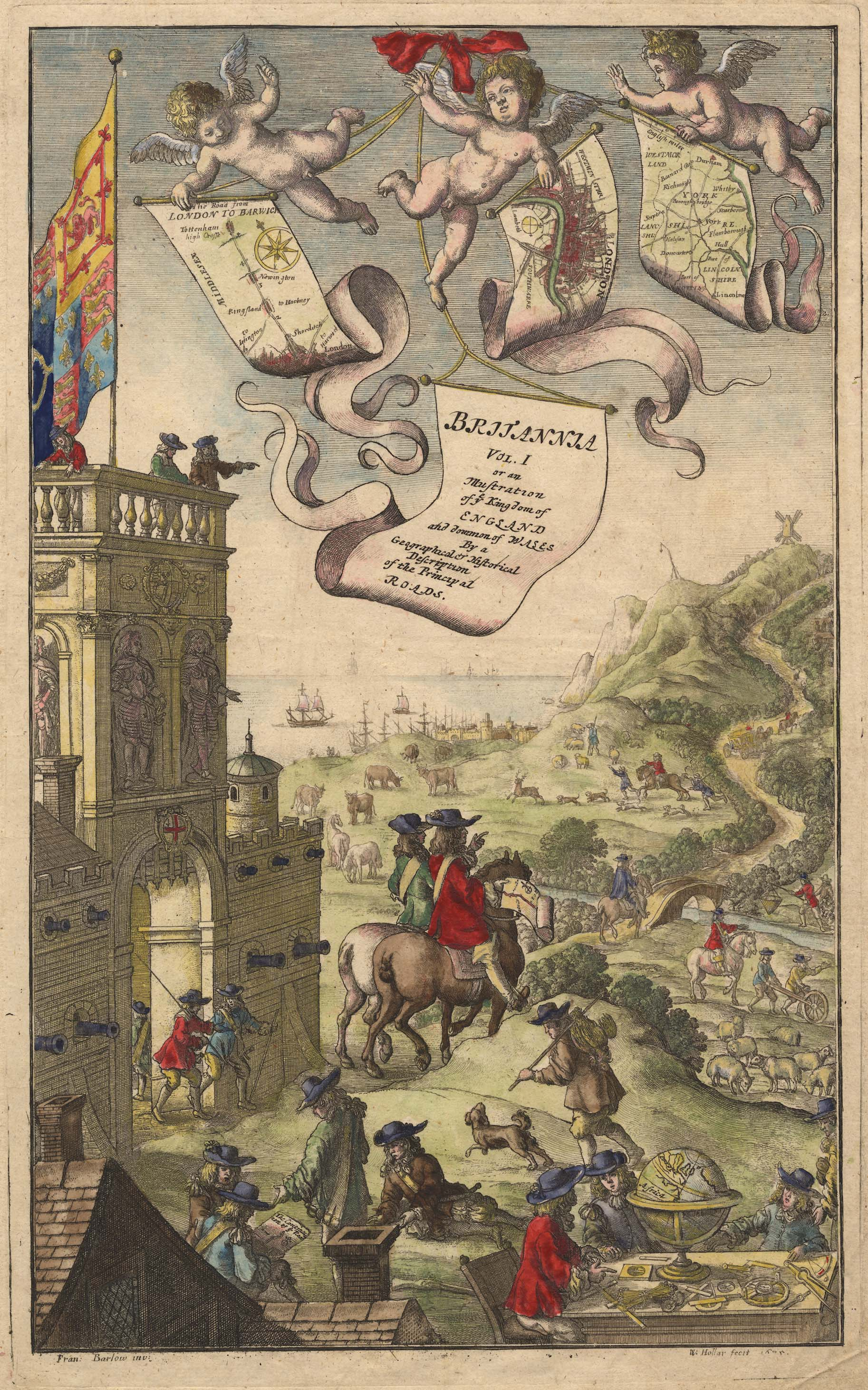
Ogilby's Britannia, frontispiece. A surveyor and assistants are shown at the lower right. This illustration, like the others in the book, was etched by Wenceslaus Hollar.

Britannia is the title of each of three atlases created in England between the late 16th and mid 18th centuries, describing some or all of the British Isles. These are the books published by William Camden (in 1586, reprinted in 1693) and Richard Blome (in 1673) and John Ogilby (in 1675). Of the three, Ogilby's is probably the best known as it was the first to use measured distances.

== Camden's Britannia ==
In 1577, William Camden (1551–1623) began his great work Britannia, a topographical and historical survey of all of Great Britain and Ireland. His stated intention was to "restore antiquity to Britaine, and Britain to his antiquity". The first edition, written in Latin, was published in 1586. It proved very popular, and ran through five further Latin editions, of 1587, 1590, 1594, 1600 and 1607, each greatly enlarged from its predecessor in both textual content and illustrations. The 1607 edition included for the first time a full set of English county maps, based on the surveys of Christopher Saxton and John Norden, and engraved by William Kip and William Hole (who also engraved the fine frontispiece). The first English-language edition, translated by Philemon Holland, appeared in 1610, again with some additional content supplied by Camden.

Britannia is a county-by-county description of Great Britain and Ireland. It is a work of chorography: a study that relates landscape, geography, antiquarianism, and history. Rather than write a history, Camden wanted to describe in detail the Great Britain of his time, and to show how the traces of the past could be discerned in the existing landscape. By this method, he produced the first coherent picture of Roman Britain.

== Blome's Britannia ==
Richard Blome (1635-1705) published his Britannia, or a Geographical Description of the Kingdom of England, Scotland and Ireland in 1673.

== Ogilby's Britannia ==
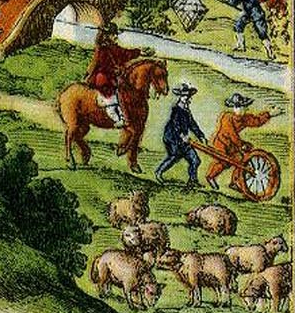
A trundle wheel in use (detail from the frontispiece of Ogilby's Britannia (1675)).

In 1675, John Ogilby (1600–1676) issued his Britannia (also Itinerarium Angliæ), a road atlas depicting in strip form of most of the major routes in England and Wales. The atlas included such details as the configurations of hills, bridges, ferries and the relative size of towns. One hundred strip road maps are shown, accompanied by a double-sided page of text giving additional advice for the map's use, notes on the towns shown and the alternative pronunciations of their name. Another innovation was Ogilby's scale of one inch to the mile (1:63360). These are marked and numbered on each map, the miles further being divided into furlongs. At that period, the measurement of many minor roads had used a locally defined mile rather than the standard mile of 1760 standard yards which Ogilby adopted in his atlas, thus setting the standard for road maps in future.

The most obvious omission from Ogilby's atlas is the route to Liverpool.

The volume includes a panoramic frontispiece plate that includes a surveyor's wheel being used to measure distances.

=== Editions ===
It appears that two editions were released, one tinted and one monochrome, under different titles. The tinted edition was called

BRITANNIA Volume the First OR, AN ILLUSTRATION OF THE KINGDOM OF ENGLAND AND Dominion of Wales: By a Geographical and Historical DESCRIPTION OF THE Principal Roads thereof. Actually Admeasured and Delineated in a Century of Whole-Sheet Copper-Sculpt.

— Fulltable.

and the monochrome edition was

Itinerarium Angliæ or, a Book of ROADS Wherein are Contain'd The Principal Road-Ways of His Majesty's Kingdom of ENGLAND and Dominion of Wales: Actually Admeasured and Delineated in a Century of Whole Sheet Copper-Sculps

— British Library

The book was sold at £5 (the equivalent of about £681 in 2019), was in a large format, (Note: folio, about 12 in × 18 in (300 mm × 460 mm)) and weighed about 8 kg (18 lb).

=== Successors ===
A version of the book, "The traveller's guide or, a most exact description of the roads of England", in a smaller format and without any maps, was published in 1699 by Abel Swall.

Ogilby's Britannia inspired and provided the model for Britannia Depicta or Ogilby improv'd published by Emanuel Bowen and John Owen in 1720.

=== List of the 100 strip maps ===
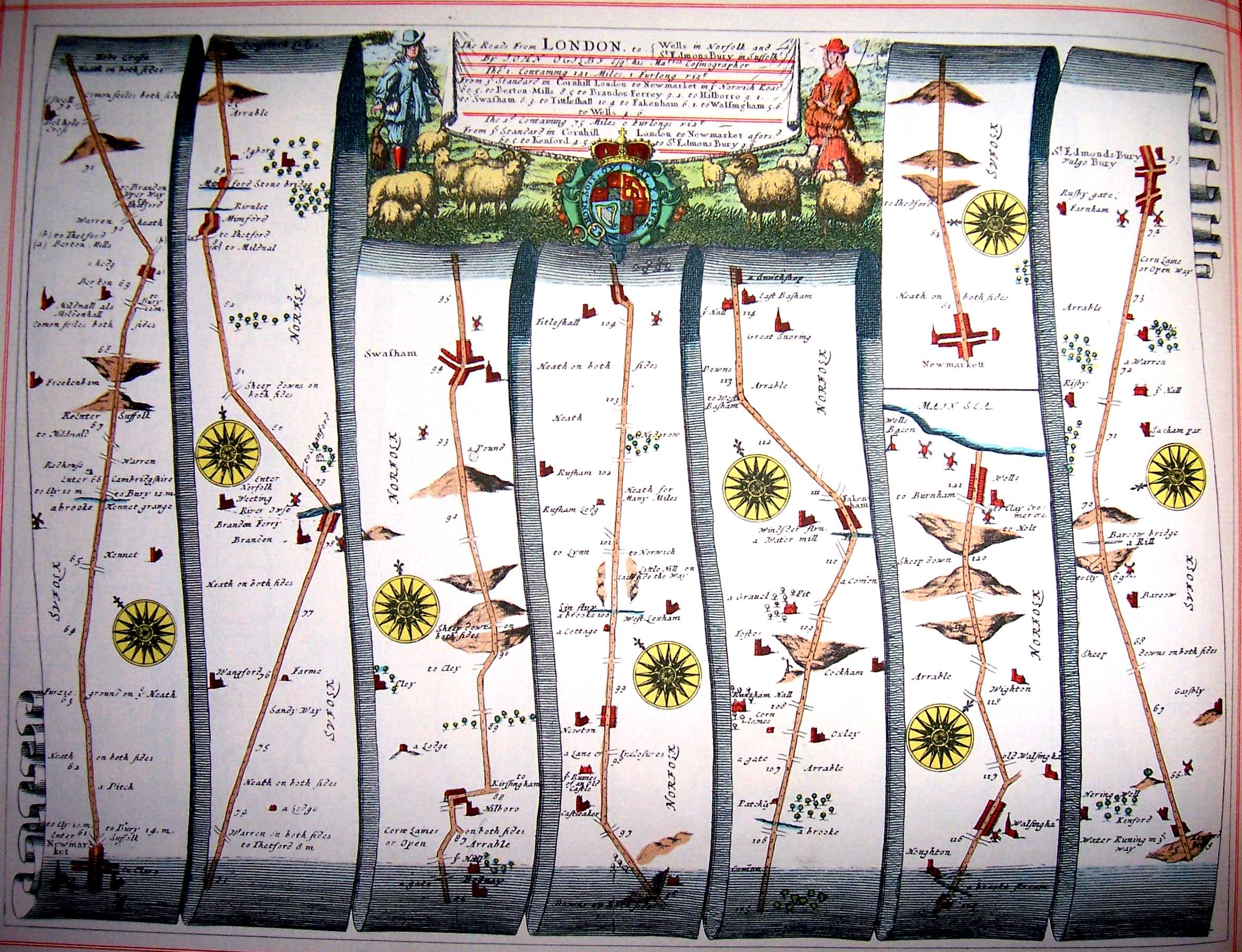
Image from John Ogilby's 1675 "Britannia" atlas, showing two routes from Newmarket, Suffolk: to Wells-next-the-Sea, Norfolk and to Bury St Edmunds, Suffolk.

The preface to the atlas gives a list ("catalogue") of the maps it contains:

1. (City of) London, Acton, Uxbridge, Beaconsfield, High Wycombe, Tetsworth, Oxford, Islip
2. Islip, Moreton-in-Marsh, Broadway, Pershore, Bromyard, Worcester
3. Bromyard, Leominster, Presteign, Aberystwyth
4. London, Ewell, Dorking, Billingshurst, Amberley, Arundel, Chichester
5. London, Waltham, Hoddesdon, Ware, Royston, Huntingdon, Stilton
6. Stilton, Stamford, Grantham, Newark, Tuxford
7. Tuxford, Doncaster, Wentbridge, Tadcaster, York
8. York, Boroughbridge, Northallerton, Darlington, Durham, Chester-le-Street
9. Chester-le-Street, Newcastle upon Tyne, Morpeth, Alnwick, Belford, Berwick
10. London, Hounslow, Maidenhead, Reading, Newbury, Hungerford, Marlborough
11. Marlborough, Calne, Chippenham, Bristol, Axbridge, Huntspill
12. London, Acton, Uxbridge, Amersham, Aylesbury, Buckingham, Banbury
13. Banbury, Stratford, Bromsgrove, Kidderminster, Bridgnorth
14. London, Brentford, Hounslow, Colnbrook, Slough, Maidenhead, Abingdon
15. Abingdon, Faringdon, Fairford, Barnsley, Gloucester, Monmouth
16. Monmouth, Newport, Cardiff, Cowbridge, Aberavon, Burton
17. Burton, Kidwelly, Haverfordwest, St Davids
18. London, Southwark, Rochester, Canterbury, Dover
19. London, Romford, Brentford, Chelmsford, Colchester, Harwich
20. London, Farningham, Maidstone, Ashford, Hythe
21. London, High Barnet, St Albans, Dunstable, Stony Stratford, Towcester
22. Towcester, Daventry, Coventry, Lichfield
23. Lichfield, Rugeley, Stone, Stableford, Nantwich, Tarporley, Chester
24. Chester, Denbigh, Conway, Beaumaris, Holyhead
25. London, Hounslow, Staines, Basingstoke, Andover
26. Andover, Salisbury, Shaftsbury, Sherborne, Crewkerne
27. Crewkerne, Honiton, Exeter, Ashburton, Plymouth
28. Plymouth, Fowey, Tregony, Penzance, Land's End
29. London, Croydon, East Grinstead, Lewes, Newhaven, Brighton, Shoreham
30. London, Wandsworth, Cobham, Godalming, Petersfield, Portsmouth
31. London, Bromley, Sevenoaks, Tonbridge, Rye
32. Andover, Warminster, Bruton, Bridgwater
33. Bridgwater, Dulverton, Barnstaple, Torrington, Hatherleigh
34. Hatherleigh, Camelford, Padstow, St Columb, Truro
35. Chippenham, Bath, Wells, Marlborough, Devizes, Trowbridge, Wells
36. Stilton, Peterborough, Spalding, Boston, Sleaford, Lincoln
37. Darleston, Brewerton, Warrington, Wigan, Preston, Garstang
38. Garstang, Lancaster, Bolton, Kendal, Penrith, Carlisle
39. Guildford, Midhurst, Chichester, Midhurst, Petersfield, Winchester
40. Stony Stratford, Northampton, Market Harborough, Leicester, Loughborough, Derby
41. Temsford, Stilton, Peterborough, Market Deeping, Sleaford, Lincoln
42. Lincoln, Redbourne, Brigg, Barton, Hull, Beverley, Flamborough
43. Puckeridge, Cambridge, Ely, Downham, King's Lynn
44. Four Shire Stone, Chipping Campden, Worcester, Ludlow, Montgomery
45. High Barnet, Hatfield, Baldock, Biggleswade, St Neots, Oakham
46. Puckeridge, Newmarket, Thetford, Attleborough, Windham, Norwich
47. St Albans, Luton, Bedford, Wellingborough, Kettering, Oakham
48. Oakham, Melton Mowbray, Nottingham, Mansfield, Rotherham, Barnsley
49. Barnsley, Halifax, Skipton, Middleham, Richmond
50. Meriden, Birmingham, Bridgnorth, Shrewsbury, Welshpool
51. Bagshot, Farnham, Alton, Alresford, Southampton, Romsey, Salisbury
52. Newmarket, Swaffham, Wells; plus Newmarket, Bury St Edmunds
53. Basingstoke, Stockbridge, Cranborne, Blandford, Dorchester, Weymouth
54. Colchester, Ipswich, Saxmundham, Beccles, Yarmouth
55. Bristol, Chipping Sodbury, Tetbury, Cirencester, Burford, South Newington, Banbury
56. Bristol, Chepstow, Monmouth, Hereford, Leominster, Ludlow
57. Ludlow, Shrewsbury, Whitchurch, Chester
58. Bristol, Wells, Glastonbury, Taunton, Exeter
59. Bristol, Gloucester, Tewkesbury, Worcester
60. Bristol, Wells, Crewkerne, Frampton, Weymouth
61. Cambridge, St Neots, Northampton, Rugby, Coventry
62. Carlisle, Jedburgh, Kelso, Berwick
63. Chester, Wrexham, Newtown, Llanbadarn Fynydd ("Vunneth Llanbader"); thence to Cardiff.
64. Llanbadarn Fynydd ("Llanbader Vunneth"), Brecon ("Breckknock"), Cardiff
65. Dartmouth, Exeter, Tiverton, Minehead
66. St Davids, Fishguard, Cardigan, Talybont
67. Talybont, Bala, Ruthin, Holywell
68. Exeter, Chulmleigh, Ilfracombe, Bideford, Torrington
69. Exeter, Tavistock, Liskeard, Truro
70. Gloucester, Cheltenham, Chipping Campden, Warwick, Coventry
71. Gloucester, Ross-on-Wye, Hereford, Knighton, Montgomery
72. Hereford, Worcester, Droitwich, Bromsgrove, Coventry, Leicester
73. Huntingdon, Ely, Bury St Edmunds, Ipswich
74. Ipswich, Thwaite, Norwich, Cromer
75. King's Lynn, Thetford, Stowmarket, Harwich
76. King's Lynn, Gayton, Billingford, Norwich, Yarmouth
77. Monmouth, Abergavenny, Brecon, Lampeter
78. Nottingham, Lincoln, Market Rasen, Grimsby
79. Oxford, Faringdon, Malmesbury, Bristol
80. Oxford, Buckingham, Bedford, Cambridge
81. Oxford, Newbury, Basingstoke, Petersfield, Chichester
82. Oxford, Banbury, Coventry, Ashby-de-la-Zouch, Derby
83. Oxford, Hungerford, Salisbury, Cranborne, Poole
84. Presteign, Builth Wells, Llandovery, Carmarthen
85. Salisbury, Marlborough, Lechlade, Chipping Campden
86. Tynemouth, Newcastle, Hexham, Haltwhistle, Carlisle
87. Welshpool, Dolgellau, Caernarvon
88. York, Ripley, Skipton, Settle, Lancaster
89. York, Leeds, Rochdale, Manchester, Warrington
90. Warrington, Chester, Manchester, Stockport, Derby
91. Carmarthen, Cardigan, Lampeter, Aberystwyth
92. Chelmsford, Sudbury, Bury St Edmunds
93. Chelmsford, Maldon, Rayleigh, Ingatestone, Billericay, Gravesend, Dover
94. Exeter, Colyford, Lyme Regis, Bridport, Dorchester, Plymouth, Dartmouth
95. Ferrybridge, Boroughbridge, Ripon, Barnard Castle; plus Ferrybridge to Wakefield
96. Kendal, Ambleside, Cockermouth, Egremont, Cockermouth, Carlisle
97. Alresford, Winchester, Poole, Christchurch, Southampton, Winchester
98. Shrewsbury, Wrexham, Holywell, Chester, Flint, Holywell
99. Whitby, Guisborough, Stockton, Durham, Sunderland, Tynemouth
100. York, Pickering, Whitby, New Malton, Sherburn, Scarborough
