= Francis Walker (entomologist) =

English entomologist (1809–1874)

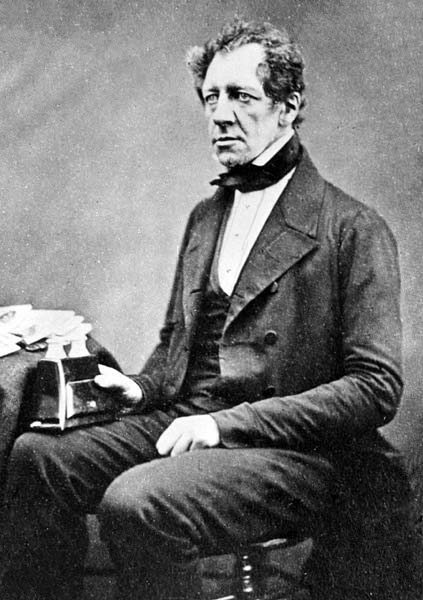
- Born: 31 July 1809; Southgate, London, UK
- Died: 5 October 1874 (aged 65); Wanstead, UK
- Notable work: Monographia Chalciditum; Insecta Britannica Diptera; catalogues of the Insects of the British Museum
- Scientific career
- Fields: entomology

Francis Walker (31 July 1809 – 5 October 1874) was an English entomologist. He was born in Southgate, London, on 31 July 1809 and died at Wanstead, England on 5 October 1874. He was one of the most prolific authors in entomology, and stirred controversy during his later life as his publications resulted in a huge number of junior synonyms. However, his assiduous work on the collections of the British Museum had great significance.

Between June 1848 and late 1873 Walker was contracted by John Edward Gray Director of the British Museum to catalogue their insects (except Coleoptera) that is Orthoptera, Neuroptera, Hemiptera, Diptera, Lepidoptera and Hymenoptera. Walker largely accomplished this and (Edwards, 1870) wrote of the plan and by implication those who implemented it:

It is to him [Gray] that the Public owe the admirable helps to the study of natural history which have been afforded by the series of inventories, guides, and nomenclatures, the publication of which began, at his instance, in the year 1844, and has been unceasingly pursued. A mere list of the various printed synopses which have grown out of Dr. Gray's suggestion of 1844 would fill many such pages as that which the reader has now before him. The consequence is, that in no department of the Museum can the student, as yet, economise his time as he can economise it in the Natural-History Department. Printed, not Manuscript, Catalogues mean time saved; disappointment avoided; study fructified. No literary labour brings so little of credit as does the work of the Catalogue-maker. None better deserves the gratitude of scholars, as well as of the general mass of visitors.

As a result of the catalogues an immense amount of material was added to the collections.

Collaborating with Alexander Henry Haliday, a lifelong friend, he was one of the first students of the Chalcidoidea. He was also a close friend of John Curtis. Walker was a member of the Entomological Society. Walker's specimens are in the Natural History Museum, London; Hope Department of Entomology, University of Oxford; the National Museum of Ireland, Dublin; Zoologische Staatssammlung München and the School of Medicine, Cairo, Egypt.

== Family and childhood ==
Francis Walker was the son of John Walker of Arnos Grove, who was a fellow of the Royal Society, the Linnean Society and the Royal Horticultural Society. Born into a wealthy and educated Quaker family, Francis spent the years 1816 (when he was seven years old) to 1820 (when he was eleven) in Switzerland at Geneva, Lucerne and Vevey where the family party was joined by Madame de Staël, the poet Lord Byron and some Swiss naturalists gathered around Nicolas Théodore de Saussure. With his brother Henry (1825–1892), Francis collected butterflies on an ascent of Mount Pilatus in 1818 and so was an entomologist at age nine. In 1840 Walker married Mary Elizabeth Ford. He lived at Arnos Grove and at 49 Bedford Square which housed the collections of the Entomological Club founded in 1826 by George Samouelle and Edward Newman among others. He relied on family money for his main income.

In 1834, Walker, a lifelong friend of another Quaker Edward Newman, took up the editorship of the Entomological Magazine unpaid for one year. In 1837, he began working on a contract basis for the British Museum where he remained until 1863.

== Recreation ==
Walker was a traveller with a liking for mountains. His known trips are:

- 1830 – An extended trip to France with the entomologist John Curtis establishing a lifelong friendship. They visited Fontainebleau Montpellier, Nantes and Vaucluse, sightseeing and collecting insects, particularly Satyridae. The trip ended in Jersey.
- 1836 – A three-month collecting trip to Lapland with William Christy, Jr. and W.D. Hooker.
- 1848 – A trip to Thanet.
- 1849 – With his new bride Elizabeth May a summer in Switzerland. They also went to the Isle of Wight.
- 1857 – Collecting and visiting museums in Calais, Rouen, Paris, Strasbourg, Aix (for fossil insects), Baden-Baden, Heidelberg, Wiesbaden, Frankfurt, Mainz, Cologne, Brussels, and Antwerp. Most of the time was spent in the Black Forest.
- 1861 – North Devon
- 1863 – In the Lake District
- 1865 – North Wales and Ireland but most of 1865 was spent on the continent, in Paris, Geneva, Lucerne, Interlaken and Altdorf. He again ascended Mount Pilatus and went to Mürren, Kandersteg, Oeschinen See and climbed to the Gemmi Pass.
- 1867 – Col de Voza, Mer de Glace, the Tête Noire Pass on the way from Martigny to Chamonix, Sion, Great St Bernard Pass, Saint-Maurice, Villeneuve and Geneva.
- 1868 – Isle of Man, Holyhead, North Wales including Llanberis.
- 1870 – Llanberis and North Wales.
- 1872 – Rome, Pisa, Lucca, Florence, Naples, Sorrento, Capri, Milan, Venice, Lake Como, Lake Maggiore.
- 1874 – Land's End and Scilly Isles.

== Major works ==
- Monographia Chalciditum. Hypolitus Balliére, 219, Regent Street, London, J. B. Balliére, 13, Rue d' École de Médecine, Paris, J. and G. Weigel, Leipsig (Leipzig, Germany)(1839)
- Insecta Britannica Diptera 3 vols. London (1851–1856) contrary to his usual practise this includes a lower number of species than were previously recorded by Curtis in the Diptera section of A Guide to the Arrangement of British Insects (part authored by Walker himself)
- 1846–1873, Walker's catalogues of the Insects of the British Museum with titles such as "Catalogues of ..." or "List of the Specimens of ... comprise 67 tiny duodecimo-sized, blue-wrappered volumes of almost 17,000 pages containing listings, descriptions, and diagnoses of more than 46,000 species, of which close to 16,000 species were described as new. The inventories were of all orders of insects (except portions of the Hymenoptera and Lepidoptera, and all of the Coleoptera). They are orderly taxonomic syntheses where the main literature sources for described species were presented and synonymies were listed for described species. Keys to genera were given diagnosing almost all the species listed.

== Different views of Walker ==
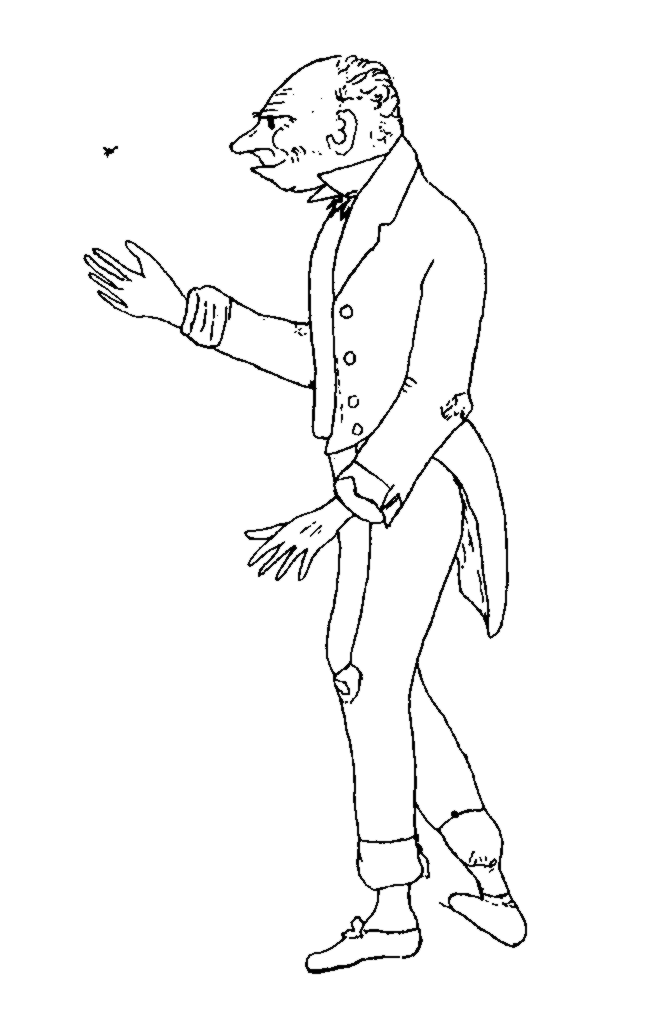
Caricature of Francis Walker by A. G. Butler (1890)

Walker is notable in the present time for the large number of synonymous taxa he described. A careless taxonomist by today's standards, he often gave more than one name to the same species. In this respect, however, he was no worse than many entomologists of his time; what makes for the more common occurrence of Walker's taxa in synonymy is the sheer volume of his work.

An unsigned obituary began "More than twenty years too late for his scientific reputation, and after having done an amount of injury almost inconceivable in its immensity, Francis Walker has passed from among us". Edward Newman, in contrast described him as the "most voluminous and most industrious writer on Entomology this country has ever produced" and said of him "I never met anyone who possessed more correct, more diversified, or more general information, or who imparted that information to others with greater readiness and kindness."

Kenneth G.V. Smith wrote:

[Walker's] 'Catalogues of Insects in the British Museum Collections' will always stand as a tribute to his industry. Walker (1836) also described the Diptera from Captain P. P. King's collection made on the first surveying voyage of Adventure and Beagle. Fortunately, many of his descriptions of Darwin's insects will endure because they were of little-known groups from little-worked regions and most of his types are still in the British Museum (Natural History). For a recent balanced account of this remarkable man see Graham (1979).

== Publication list ==
partial (Walker wrote over 300 scientific papers and notes).

- 1833. Monographia chalcidum (continued from page 384). Entomological Magazine. 1(5): 455–466.
- 1834. Monographia chalciditum (continued from Vol. I. page 466.). Entomological Magazine. 2: 13–39.
- 1834. Monographia chalciditum (continued from p. 39). Entomological Magazine. 2(2): 148–179.
- 1834. Monographia chalciditum (continued from p. 179.). Entomological Magazine. 2: 286–309.
- 1834. Monographia chalciditum (continued from p. 309). Entomological Magazine. 2(4): 340–369.
- 1835. Characters of some undescribed New Holland Diptera. Entomological Magazine. 2(5): 468–473.
- 1835. Monographia chalciditum (continued from p. 369). Entomological Magazine. 2(5): 476–502.
- 1835. Monographia chalciditum (continued from Vol. II., page 502.). Entomological Magazine. 3(1): 94–97.
- 1835. Monographia chalciditum (continued from p. 97.). Entomological Magazine. 3: 182–206.
- 1836. Monographia chalciditum (continued from p. 206.). Entomological Magazine. 3(5): 465–496.
- 1837. Monographia chalciditum (continued from Vol. III. p. 496.). Entomological Magazine. 4(1): 9–26.
- 1838. Descriptions of British chalcidites. Annals and Magazine of Natural History. (1)1(4): 307–312.
- 1838. Descriptions of British chalcidites. [continuation from p. 312] Annals and Magazine of Natural History. (1)1(5): 381–387.
- 1839. Monographia Chalciditum. Volume 1. Balliere, London. 333 pp.
- 1839. Monographia Chalciditum. Volume 2. Balliere, London. 100 pp.
- 1843. Description des Chalcidites trouvées au bluff de Saint-Jean, dans la Floride orientale; par MM. E. Doubleday et R. Forster. Premier mire. Annales de la Société Entomologique de France. (2)1: 145–162.
- 1846. Characters of some undescribed species of chalcidites. (Continued from p. 115). Annals and Magazine of Natural History. (1)17(111): 177–185.
- 1846. Part I—Chalcidites. pp. 1–100 In: List of the Specimens of Hymenopterous Insects in the Collection of the British Museum. Printed by order of the Trustees, London. vi + 237 pp.
- 1849. List of the Specimens of Dipterous Insects in the Collection of the British Museum. Part II. Printed by order of the Trustees [British Museum], London. 231–484 pp.
- 1849. List of the Specimens of Dipterous Insects in the Collection of the British Museum. Part III. Printed by order of the Trustees [British Museum], London. 485–687 pp.
- 1849. List of the Specimens of Dipterous Insects in the Collection of the British Museum. Part IV. Printed by order of the Trustees [British Museum], London. 689–1172 pp.
- 1850. Descriptions of aphides. (Continued from vol. v. p. 395). Annals and Magazine of Natural History. (2)6(31): 41–48.
- 1850-1956 Insecta Saundersiana or, Characters of undescribed insects in the collection of William Wilson Saunders John Van Voorst. privately printed booklets on various orders of insects in the collection of William Wilson Saunders pdf Saunders arranged for Walker to write the parts on Diptera and later, the Homoptera.
- 1851. List of the Specimens of Homopterous Insects in the Collection of the British Museum. Part II. British Museum, London. 1188 pp.
- 1852. Diptera. Part I. pp. 1–75 In: Insecta Saundersiana: Or Characters of Undescribed Species in the Collection of William Wilson Saunders, Esq., F.R.S., F.L.S., &c. Vol. I. John Van Voorst, London. 474 pp.
- 1852. List of the Specimens of Homopterous Insects in the Collection of the British Museum. Part IV. British Museum, London. 1188 pp.
- 1853. Catalogue of the Specimens of Neuropterous Insects in the Collection of the British Museum. Part II. – Sialides-Nemopterides. British Museum, London. 193–476 pp.
- 1853. Catalogue of the Specimens of Neuropterous Insects in the Collection of the British Museum. Part III. – (Termitidae-Ephemeridae). British Museum, London. 477–585 pp.
- 1855. List of the Specimens of Lepidopterous Insects in the Collection of the British Museum. Part V. Lepidoptera Heterocera. British Museum (Natural History), London. 977–1257 pp.
- 1856. Diptera. Part V. pp. 415–474 In: Insecta Saundersiana: Or Characters of Undescribed Species in the Collection of William Wilson Saunders, Esq., F.R.S., F.L.S., &c. Vol. I. John Van Voorst, London. 474 pp.
- 1856. List of the Specimens of Lepidopterous Insects in the Collection of the British Museum. Part IX.--Noctuidae. British Museum (Natural History), London. 1–252 pp.
- 1856. List of the Specimens of Lepidopterous Insects in the Collection of the British Museum. Part X.--Noctuidae. British Museum (Natural History), London. 253–491 pp.
- 1856. List of the Specimens of Lepidopterous Insects in the Collection of the British Museum. Part VIII.–-Sphingidae. British Museum (Natural History), London. 1–271 pp.
- 1857. Catalogue of the dipterous insects collected at Singapore and Malacca by Mr. A.R. Wallace, with descriptions of new species. Journal of the Proceedings of the Linnean Society: Zoology. 1: 4–39.
- 1857. Catalogue of the dipterous insects collected at Sarawak, Borneo by Mr. A.R. Wallace, with descriptions of new species. Journal of the Proceedings of the Linnean Society: Zoology. 1: 105–136.
- 1857: Catalogue of the homopterous insects collected at Sarawak, Borneo, by Mr. A.R. Wallace, with description of new species. Journal of the Proceedings of the Linnean Society: Zoology. 1: 141–175.
- 1857. List of the Specimens of Lepidopterous Insects in the Collection of the British Museum. Part XIII.--Noctuidae. British Museum (Natural History), London. 983–1236 pp.
- 1857. Characters of undescribed Diptera in the collection of W. W. Saunders, Esq., F.R.S., &c. [part]. Transactions of the Entomological Society of London (n.s.). 4: 119–158.
- 1858. Characters of some apparently undescribed Ceylon insects. Annals and Magazine of Natural History. (3)2(9): 202–209.
- 1858. Characters of some apparently undescribed Ceylon insects. (Continued from p. 209). Annals and Magazine of Natural History. (3)2(10): 280–286.
- 1858. List of the Specimens of Lepidopterous Insects in the Collection of the British Museum. Part XIV.--Noctuidae. British Museum (Natural History), London.
- 1858. List of the Specimens of Lepidopterous Insects in the Collection of the British Museum. Part XV.--Noctuidae. British Museum (Natural History), London. 1521–1888 pp.
- 1858. List of the Specimens of Lepidopterous Insects in the Collection of the British Museum. Part XVI.--Deltoides. British Museum (Natural History), London. 1–253 pp.
- 1858. Characters of undescribed Diptera in the collection of W.W. Saunders, Esq., F.R.S., &c. Transactions of the Entomological Society of London. (2)4(6): 190–235.
- 1859. Characters of some apparently undescribed Ceylon insects. (Continued from p. 56). Annals and Magazine of Natural History. (3)3(16): 258–265.
- 1859. Catalogue of dipterous insects collected in the Aru Islands by Mr. A.R. Wallace, with descriptions of new species. Journal of the Proceedings of the Linnean Society: Zoology. 3: 77–131.
- 1859. Catalogue of the dipterous insects collected at Makessar in Celebes by Mr. A.R. Wallace, with descriptions of new species. Journal of the Proceedings of the Linnean Society: Zoology. 4: 90–172.
- 1859. List of the Specimens of Lepidopterous Insects in the Collection of the British Museum. Part XVII.--Pyralides. British Museum (Natural History), London. 255–508 pp.
- 1859. List of the Specimens of Lepidopterous Insects in the Collection of the British Museum. Part XIX.--Pyralides. British Museum (Natural History), London. 799–1036 pp.
- 1860. Characters of some apparently undescribed Ceylon insects. Annals and Magazine of Natural History. Volume: 5, Series 3, Pages: 304–311.
- 1859 [1860] Catalogue of the dipterous insects collected at Makessar in the Celebes by A.R. Wallace, Esq., with descriptions of new species [part] Journal of the proceedings of the Linnean Society 4:90-144
- 1861. Catalogue of the dipterous insects collected at Amboyna by Mr. A.R. Wallace, with descriptions of new species. Journal of the Proceedings of the Linnean Society: Zoology. 5: 144–168.
- 1861. List of the Specimens of Lepidopterous Insects in the Collection of the British Museum. Part XXII.--Geometrites (continued). British Museum (Natural History), London. 499–755.
- 1861. List of the Specimens of Lepidopterous Insects in the Collection of the British Museum. Part XVIII.--Geometrites. British Museum (Natural History), London. 757–1020 pp.
- 1862. Catalogue of the heterocerous lepidopterous insects collected at Sarawak, in Borneo, by Mr. A.R. Wallace, with descriptions of new species. (Continued from page 145). Journal of the Proceedings of the Linnean Society: Zoology. 6: 171–198.
- 1863. List of the Specimens of Lepidopterous Insects in the Collection of the British Museum. Part XXVII. Crambites & Tortricites. British Museum (Natural History), London. 1–286 pp.
- 1863. List of the Specimens of Lepidopterous Insects in the Collection of the British Museum. Part XXVIII. Tortricites & Tineites. British Museum (Natural History), London. 287–561 pp.
- 1864. List of the Specimens of Lepidopterous Insects in the Collection of the British Museum. Part XXIX. Tineites. British Museum (Natural History), London. 533–835 pp.
- 1864. List of the Specimens of Lepidopterous Insects in the Collection of the British Museum. Part XXX. Tineites. British Museum (Natural History), London. 837–1096 pp.
- 1865. Descriptions of new species of the dipterous insects of New Guinea. Journal of the Proceedings of the Linnean Society: Zoology. 8: 102–130.
- 1865. Descriptions of some New Species of Dipterous Insects from the Island of Salwatty, near New Guinea. Journal of the Proceedings of the Linnean Society: Zoology. 8: 130–136.
- 1865. List of the Specimens of Lepidopterous Insects in the Collection of the British Museum. Part XXXII. Supplement.--Part 2. British Museum (Natural History), London. 323–706 pp.
- 1866. List of the Specimens of Lepidopterous Insects in the Collection of the British Museum. Part XXXIV. Supplement.--Part 4. British Museum (Natural History), London. 1121–1533 pp.
- 1866. Appendix. A list of mammals, birds, insects, reptiles, fishes, shells, annelides, and Diatomaceae, collected by myself in British Columbia and Vancouver Island, with notes on their habits. [List of Coleoptera]. pp. 309–334 In: John Keast Lord. The Naturalist in Vancouver Island and British Columbia. Richard Bentley, London. 375 pp.
- 1868. Catalogue of the Specimens of Blattariae in the Collection of the British Museum. Printed for the Trustees of the British Museum, London. 239 pp.
- 1869. Catalogue of the Specimens of Dermaptera Saltatoria and Supplement to the Blattariae in the Collection of the British Museum. [Part I.] British Museum, London. 1–224 pp.
- 1869. Catalogue of the Specimens of Dermaptera Saltatoria in the Collection of the British Museum. Part II. [Locustidae (contd.).] British Museum, London. 225–423 pp.
- 1870. Catalogue of the Specimens of Dermaptera Saltatoria in the Collection of the British Museum. Part III. [Locustidae (contd.), Acrididae.] British Museum, London. 425–604 pp.
- 1871. Notes on Chalcidiae. Part I. Eurytomidae. E.W. Janson, London. 1–17 pp.
- 1871. List of Diptera collected in Egypt and Arabia, by J. K. Lord, Esq., with descriptions of the species new to science. Entomologist 5: 255–263
- 1872. Catalogue of the Specimens of Heteropterous Hemiptera in the Collection of the British Museum. 5. Printed for the Trustees of the British Museum, London. 1–202 pp.

== See also ==
- Category:Taxa named by Francis Walker (entomologist)
