= Talybont railway station =

Railway station in Gwynedd, Wales

Talybont Welsh: Tal-y-bont
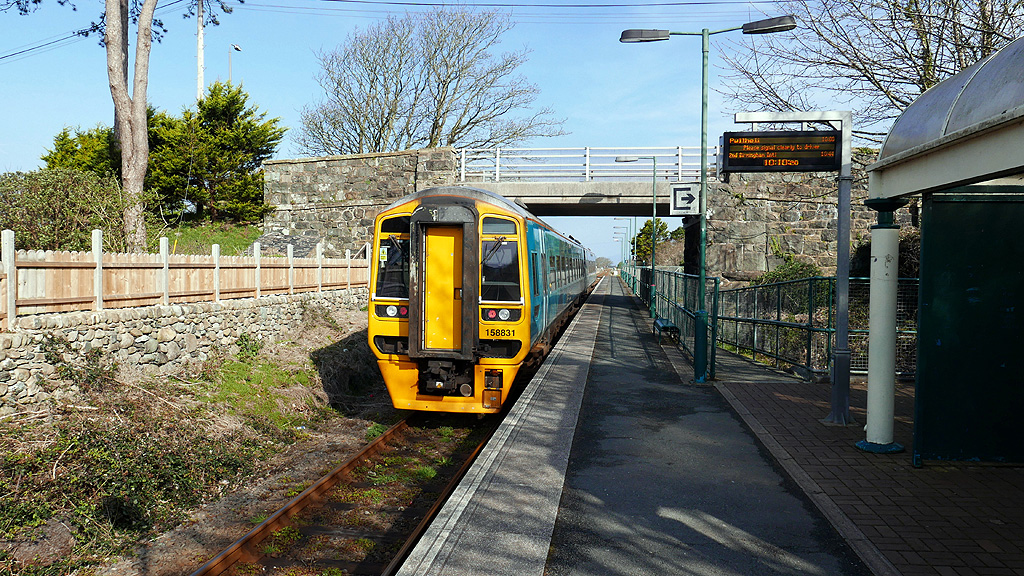

General information
- Location: Tal-y-bont, Gwynedd; Wales
- Coordinates: 52.773°N 4.097°W
- Grid reference: SH586214
- Manager: Transport for Wales
- Platforms: 1

Other information
- Station code: TLB
- Classification: DfT category F2

Passengers
- 2021/22: ▲16,280
- 2022/23: ▲26,046
- 2023/24: ▲28,858
- 2024/25: ▲35,872
- 2025/26: ▲39,478
Location
Notes
- Passenger statistics from the Office of Rail and Road

Talybont railway station serves the villages of Tal-y-bont and Llanddwywe in Gwynedd, Wales. The station is an unstaffed halt on the Cambrian Coast Railway with passenger services to Harlech, Porthmadog, Pwllheli, Barmouth, Machynlleth and Shrewsbury.

== Services ==
The typical off peak service at the station is one train every two hours between Pwllheli and Shrewsbury with some trains continuing to Birmingham International.

Preceding station	National Rail	Following station
Dyffryn Ardudwy	Transport for Wales Cambrian Coast Line	Llanaber
	Historical railways	
Dyffryn Ardudwy; Line and station open	Cambrian Railways; Aberystwith and Welsh Coast Railway	Llanaber; Line and station open
