= Sketchley, Leicestershire =

Former village in Leicestershire, England

Coordinates: 52.525637°N 1.376153°W

Sketchley
- Residential area
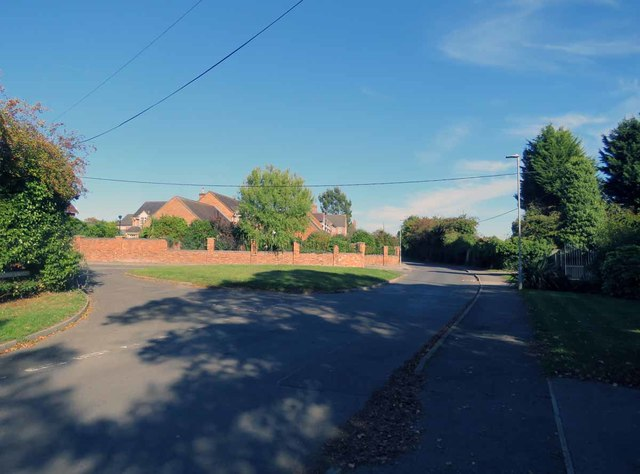
- Sketchley Lane/Old Village Junction, Burbage

- Location within Leicestershire
  - London: 96 mi (154 km) S
- Civil parish: Burbage
- District: Hinckley & Bosworth
- Shire county: Leicestershire
- Region: East Midlands
- Country: England
- Sovereign state: United Kingdom
- Post town: Hinckley
- Postcode district: LE10
- Dialling code: 01455
- Police: Leicestershire
- Fire: Leicestershire
- Ambulance: East Midlands
- UK Parliament: Hinckley and Bosworth

Sketchley is a deserted village and now a residential area that is part of the village of Burbage in the Hinckley & Bosworth borough of the ceremonial county of Leicestershire, England.

== Toponymy ==
Variations of the place name Sketchley have been recorded since the year 1220. The name is thought to be derived from the Old Norse word "skeio" meaning a boundary and the Old English word "clif", meaning a cliff or steep slope. The boundary indicated is nearby Watling Street, the furthest extent of the Danelaw.

== History ==
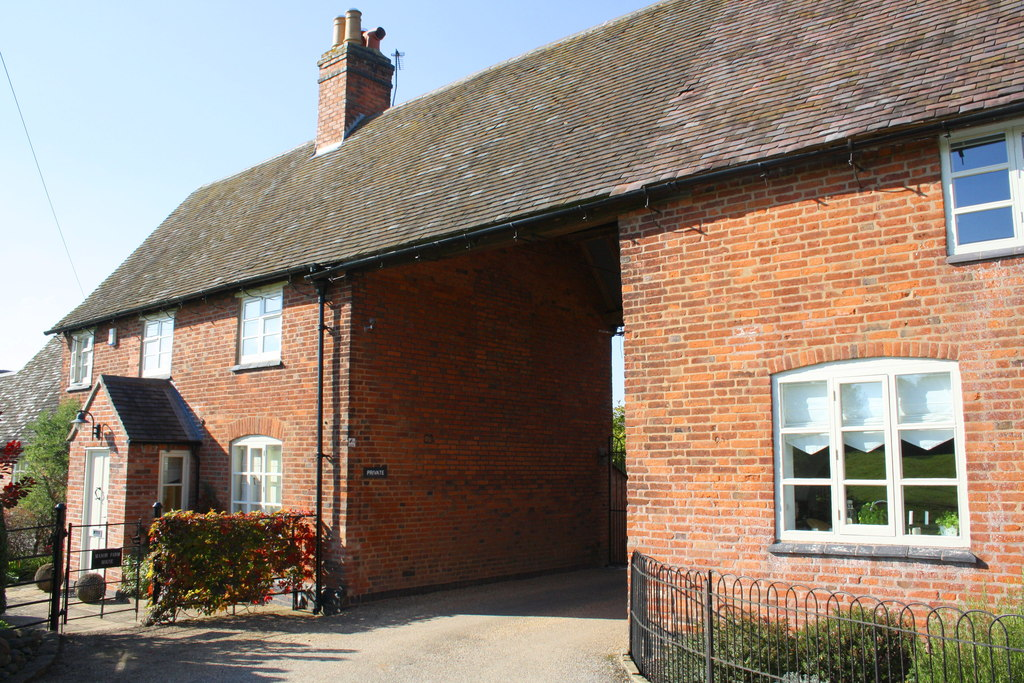
Manor Farm Road, Sketchley Old Village

In 1100, the manors of Aston, Burbage and Sketchley were given to Robert de Flamville.

Another mention of Sketchley was as part of the civil parish of Aston Flamville and the Hundred of Sparkenhoe. The poor law union was made in Hinckley. Sketchley was described by Samuel Lewis in his "A Topographical Dictionary of England, by Samuel Lewis, seventh edition" as

a hamlet, in the parish of Aston-Framville, union of Hinckley, hundred of Sparkenhoe, S. division of the county of Leicester, 1¼ mile (S. by W.) from Hinckley; containing 47 inhabitants. Here was formerly a chapel

A book from 1777 briefly mentions "Sketchley".

Charles James Billsson, in his 1895 Folk-Lore of Leicestershire and Rutland, mentions Sketchley, saying:

In Sketchley, a hamlet in the Burbage parish, near Hinckley, there is a well, now enclosed, which once had the reputation of bright-ening rustic brains. A quick repartee or smart saying was sure to be greeted, "Oh, you've been to Sketchley lately", or a dullard would be recommended to "go to Sketchley". "Leicester Chronicle", 8th June, 1874.

== Sketchley Hall ==
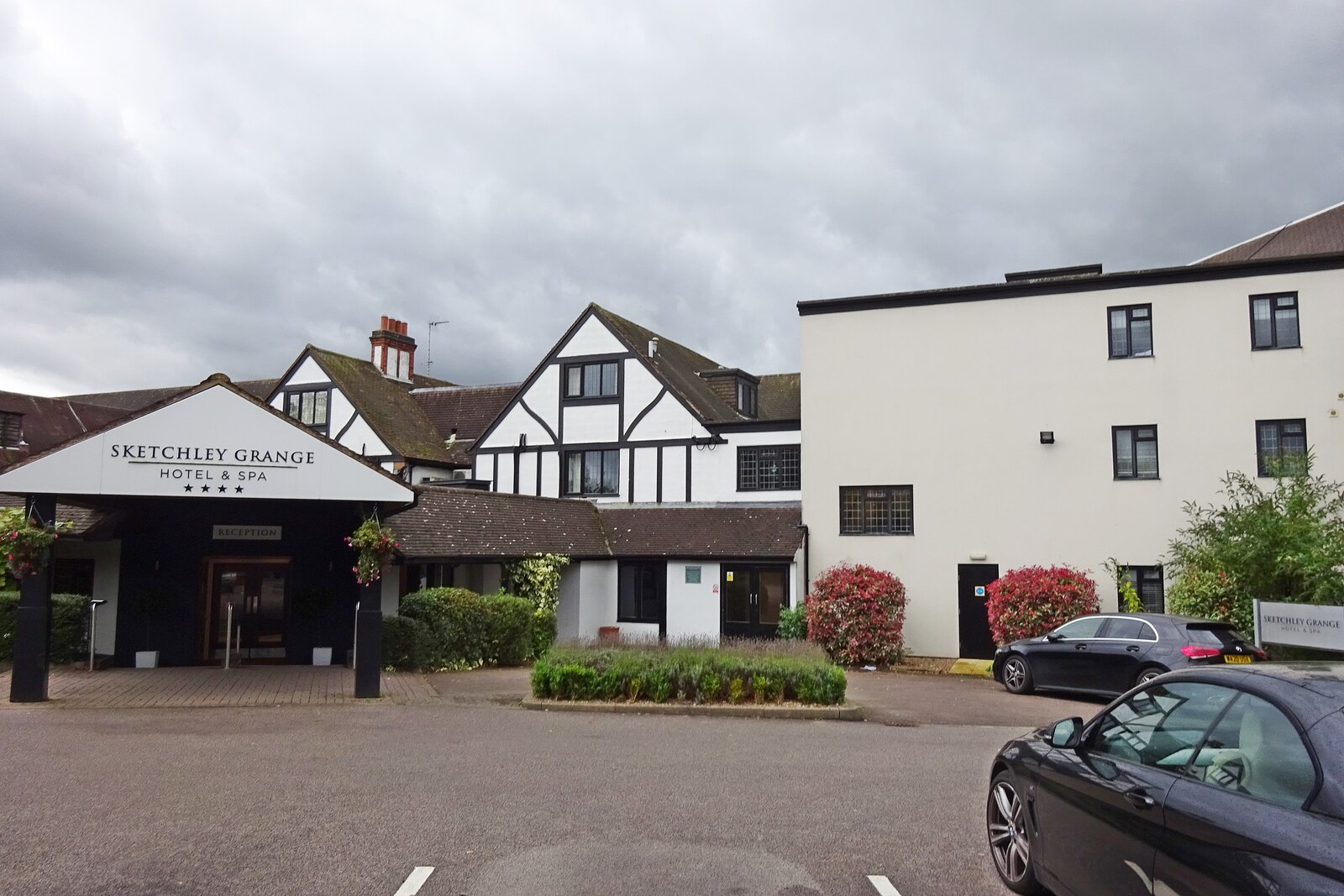
Sketchley Grange Hotel and Spa

A notable building in the village named "Sketchley Hall" was built in 1892 by Charles H. Alldridge, who bought, in 1919, the 1914 Grand National winner, Sunloch. The horse was in training for the 1920 Grand National, in Sketchley, when it fell, broke a fetlock, and was shot and buried on the spot. He purchased the hall from the Sketchley Estate. However, he later sold the hall in 1930 before it was rebuilt in 1934. The hall is now a hotel and spa.

== Present day ==
Sketchley is now used as the name of an area of Burbage and a ward on the Hinckley and Bosworth Borough Council. As of 2026 the former Sketchley Lodge Farm is now 'The Lodge at Sketchley Park' a 100+ housing estate on the former farm
