= Undichna simplicitas =

Undichna simplicitas Temporal range: Upper Carboniferous – ?

Trace fossil classification
- Ichnogenus: Undichna
- Ichnospecies: Undichna simplicitas

Binomial name
- †Undichna simplicitas Anderson, 1976

Ichnospecies

Undichna simplicitas is a fish-fin, or fish-swimming fossil trackway left as a fossil impression on a substrate; this type of fossil is an ichnofossil, and in this case an ichnospecies. The ichnogenus for the fish-fin, or fish tracks is named Undichna.

Fossil trackways of Undichna simplicitas have been found in Alabama, USA, in the Pottsville Form, (Westphalian A, Upper Carboniferous, coal mine and tailings); also Indiana, Kansas, and Spain, (El Montsec and Las Hoyas).

== See also ==
- Fossil trackway
- Trace fossil
