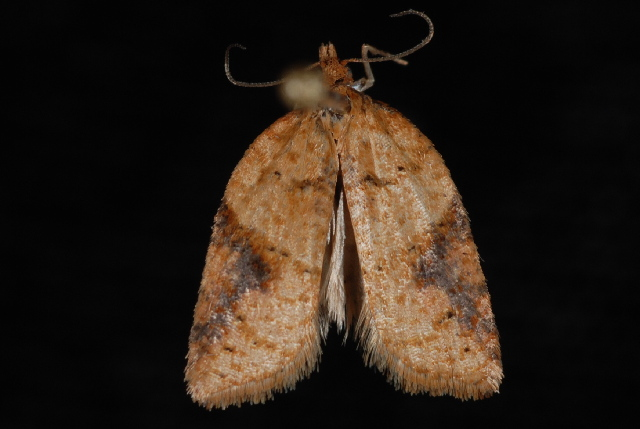

Scientific classification
- Domain: Eukaryota
- Kingdom: Animalia
- Phylum: Arthropoda
- Class: Insecta
- Order: Lepidoptera
- Family: Tortricidae
- Genus: Acleris
- Species: A. britannia

Binomial name
- Acleris britannia Kearfott, 1904

Synonyms
- Peronea britannia

= Acleris britannia =

Brittania moth

Species of moth

Acleris britannia, the Brittania moth, is a species of moth of the family Tortricidae. It is found in North America, where it has been recorded from Alberta, British Columbia, California, Oregon, Saskatchewan and Washington. Adults have been recorded on wing from June to October.

The larvae feed on Rubus occidentalis, Rubus parviflorus, Rubus ursinus, Potentilla and Rosa species.
