= Tal-y-bont, Dyffryn Ardudwy =

Coordinates: 52.771°N 4.095°W

Tal-y-bont
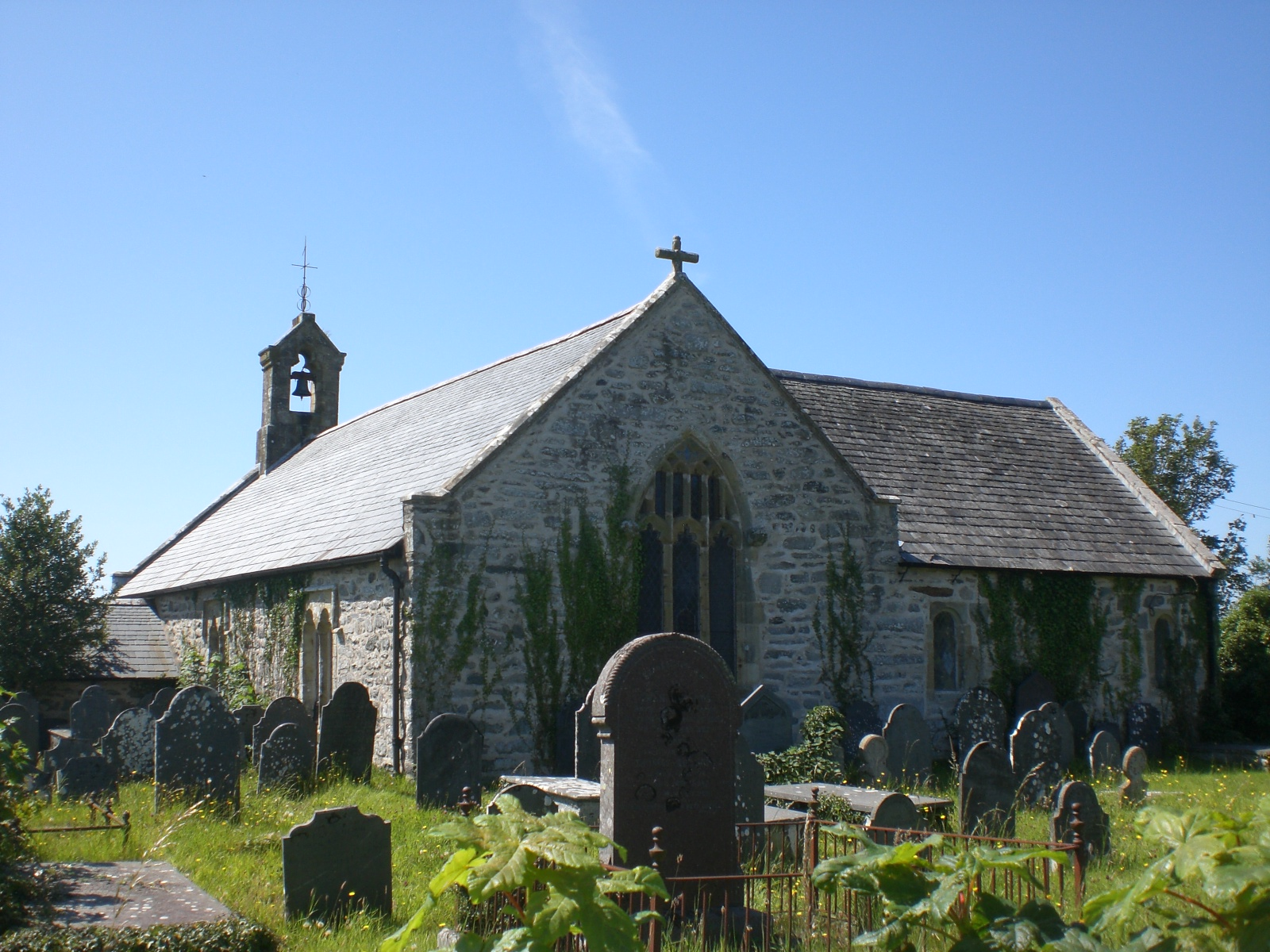
- West side of Saint Dwywe's church, Llanddwywe

- Location within Gwynedd
- OS grid reference: SH587214
- Community: Dyffryn Ardudwy
- Principal area: Gwynedd
- Preserved county: Gwynedd
- Country: Wales
- Sovereign state: United Kingdom
- Post town: TALYBONT
- Postcode district: LL43
- Dialling code: 01341
- Police: North Wales
- Fire: North Wales
- Ambulance: Welsh
- UK Parliament: Dwyfor Meirionnydd
- Senedd Cymru – Welsh Parliament: Dwyfor Meirionnydd

Tal-y-bont (otherwise Talybont) is a village north of the town of Barmouth in north Wales.

Tal-y-bont has a railway station on the Cambrian Line and has many caravan sites, a hair dresser, a pub called the Ysgethin Inn, and a restaurant.

It is home to the annual Dyffryn and Talybont Funday, held on the last Sunday in July.

It adjoins the village of Dyffryn Ardudwy and is part of the community of the same name.
