= Insecta Britannica Diptera =

1850s entomology work by Francis Walker

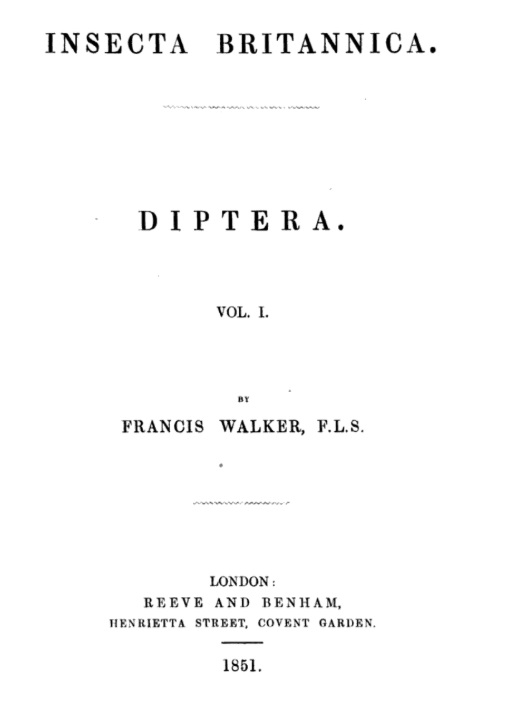
- Author: Francis Walker
- Subject: Zoology
- Genre: Non fiction
- Publication date: 1851

Insecta Britannica Diptera is a seminal work of entomology by Francis Walker. The work spans three volumes; a fourth volume was never published. Parts of the work were credited by Walker to Alexander Henry Haliday, including the characters and synoptic tables of the Empididae, Syrphidae, and Dolichopodidae and addenda and corrigenda intended for volume 4.

== The dating of Insecta Britannica Diptera ==
The precise dates of early entomological publications are frequently hard to establish.

- Volume 1: The preface is dated December 1851.
- Volume 2: Putatively dated 1853.
- Volume 3: An advertisement bound at the back of the volume is dated 31 March 1856.
