= Britannia, Ontario =

Britannia refers to several places in Ontario:

- Britannia, Ottawa
- A community within Lake of Bays in Muskoka
- A former village now part of Mississauga
