= Britannia Fields =

Public open space in Burbage, Leics, England

Coordinates: 52.52321°N 1.35293°W

The Britannia Fields are a public open space in Britannia Road, Burbage, Leicestershire.

== History ==
The Fields land was once part of the ancient three field system which operated in Burbage during Medieval times. The hedge row at the western hedge of the field represented one boundary, and is one of the oldest hedges in Burbage at least 600 years.

By 1838 on the tithe map of the village, number 651, the land was owned by Joseph Freeman, who gave his name to Freeman’s lane. This was pasture land known as Home Close which measured 2 acres 3 rods 22 poles (2.89 acres (11,700 m^{2})), and was let to Thomas Dowell. 18 shillings and 1d (£0.90) was paid in tithes to the church.

In the 1930s, the area was used as playing fields for various local football teams.

Britannia Buildings was originally a hosiery factory of Moore, Eady Murcott & Goode, built on the edge of the land in 1890s.

At the start of World War II, the building was requisitioned and was home to a number of squadrons including a medical corps. Later a tank battalion which practised battle exercises on the playing fields. The most significant guests were the 307 Airborne Engineers of the U.S.A. 82 Airborne Division who were housed, and trained here from Feb to June 1944 prior to the D-Day landings. They often trained and played baseball on the field. Some of the survivors’ visited the site in June 2004 for the 60th D Day Anniversary.

A number of temporary wood huts were erected as barracks for the troops which after the war were used as temporary housing up to the early 1950s when they were finally demolished. In 1951, these buildings were converted to a territorial barracks for D squadron Prince Albert’s own Leicestershire Yeomanry which used the area for training.

By the 1970s, the barracks had become Britannia Buildings and houses a number of small businesses.

== Current uses ==
Currently the area is used mainly for community events such as carnivals, fireworks, rugby, scouting and young children's play. The yearly summer carnival which is held on the Britannia fields, is organised by the Burbage carnival committee, whose purpose is to raise funds to donate to local good causes. This has been a very popular community event and has caused in over 1/2 million pounds for good causes. The carnival committee also runs the Burbage bonfire and fireworks display held on Britannia fields - all to support local charities.

=== Sports ===
Britannia Fields is also the home pitch of Burbage RFC since 1984, and along with the Red Lion pub forms the club's home ground and clubhouse.

It is also home to local grassroots football club FC Burbage (www.fcburbage.co.uk). The club offers football to over 30 teams covering all age groups and adults, the club also has a thriving set of girls teams.

In 2023 Burbage Parish Council held a public consultation on plans to create an artificial turf football pitch at Britannia Fields.
