= Undichna britannica =

Undichna britannica Temporal range: Silurian – ?

Trace fossil classification
- Ichnogenus: †Undichna
- Ichnospecies: †Undichna britannica

Binomial name
- †Undichna britannica Higgs, 1988

Undichna britannica is a fish-fin, or fish-swimming fossil trackway left as a fossil impression on a substrate; this type of fossil is an ichnofossil, and in this case an ichnospecies.

The U. britannica fish-fin tracks, or trackways are often associated with current or wave ripple marks, probably shallow water, near-shoreline. Other deep water varieties may be less common, or associated with narrowed current flow between obstructions. The sinusoidal high points of the ripple marks may lend itself to the formation of the trackways.

== See also ==
- Trace fossil
- Fossil trackway
