= Hugh Loxdale =

British entomologist

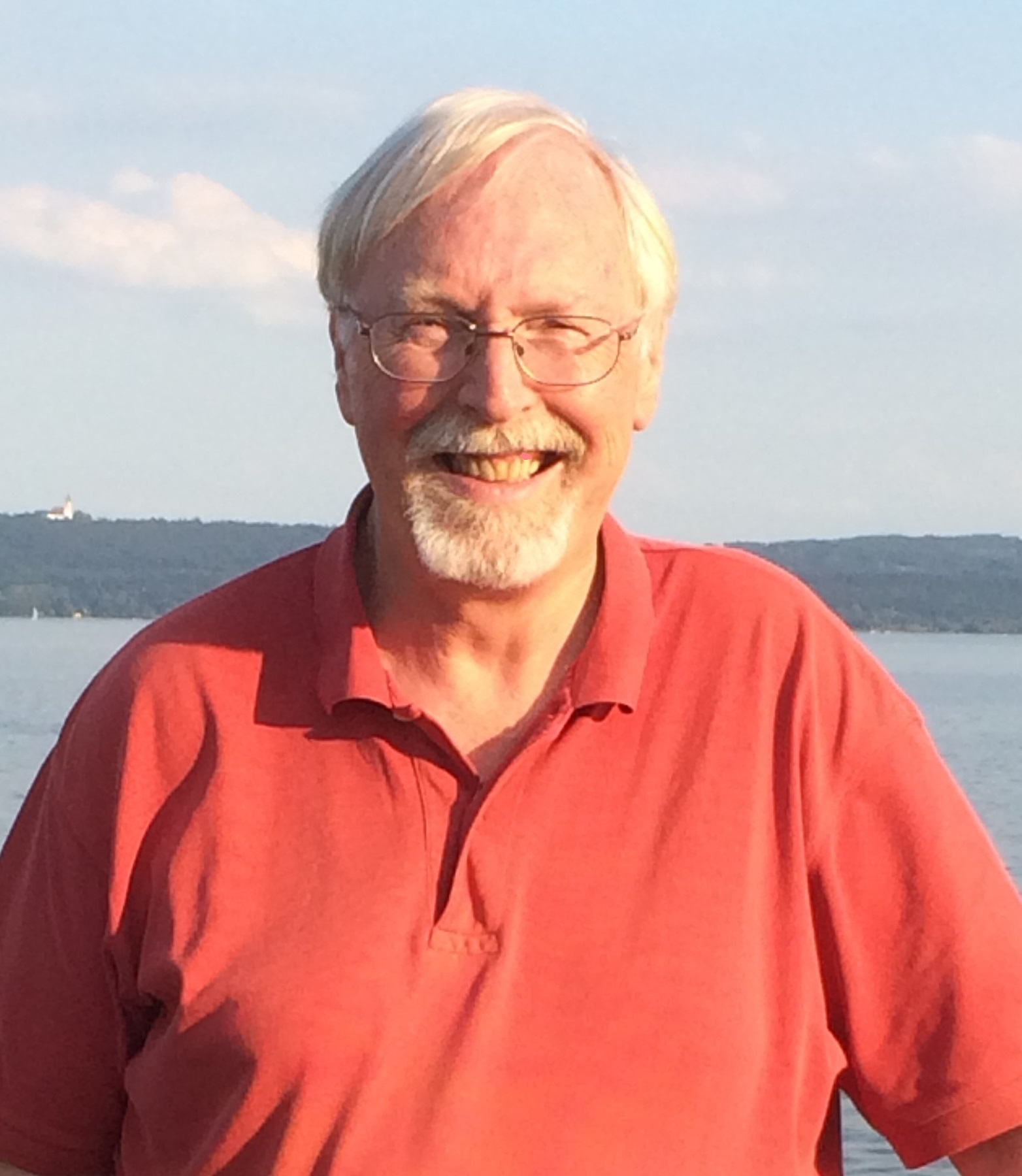
- Hugh Loxdale, September 2016

Hugh David Loxdale is an entomologist. He was professor of ecology at the Institute of Ecology, University of Jena from 2009 to 2010, president of the Royal Entomological Society from 2004 to 2006, and honorary visiting professor at the School of Biosciences, Cardiff University. Loxdale works on the population biology, ecology, and genetics of insects, especially aphids and their wasp parasitoids.

== Education and early career ==
Hugh Loxdale was educated at Corner Hall Secondary Modern Boys’ School, Hemel Hempstead, Hertfordshire, England from 1962 to 1967, and Apsley Grammar School, Hemel Hempstead (now Longdean School) from 1967 to 1969. On leaving school, he joined the Entomology Department at Rothamsted Experimental Station (now Rothamsted Research), in Harpenden, Hertfordshire, working in the Insect Survey, then run by L.R. (Roy) Taylor (1924–2007), studying the demography of moths and aphids as part of the national light trap and 12.2-metre-high (40 ft) suction trap surveys, respectively.

== Scientific contributions ==
Loxdale's research demonstrated that as the tansy aphid, parasitized by its specialist wasp parasitoid Lysiphlebus hirticornis, underwent increased genetic variation, so did that of its parasitoid. This suggested a fine-grained co-evolutionary tracking to be in operation. Such a scenario is supportive of the Red Queen hypothesis, whereby a host organism (here an aphid) is attempting to evolve away from its antagonist (here a parasitoid), which is meanwhile co-evolving in order to retain the ability to attack it, i.e. keep pace with it in an ecological-evolutionary sense. Loxdale also determined the insecticide resistance status of the serious agricultural pest the peach-potato aphid, Myzus persicae (Sulzer). From this work, the spatial and temporal dynamics of this important (and now highly cross-resistant) pest aphid could be followed, thereby leading to more rational and effective control measures in the field.

Loxdale has written reviews on absence of strict genetic uniformity in populations of clonal organisms such as aphids. This lack of uniformity is due to the rapid rate of mutation resulting from various mechanisms (e.g. point mutations due to errors of replication, inversion polymorphisms related to transposon effects, etc.) amplified by the huge reproductive potential of the animals concerned, e.g., not only do aphids show ‘telescoping of generations’ such that an adult asexual female has her children and grandchildren within her, but also the ability to produce a large number of asexual copies (10-100 offspring) in a short time (10-14 days). Hence, a single aphid can, in theory produce enough offspring to cover the entire planet to a depth of many kilometres in a single growing season! This of course has serious potential consequences for the agricultural, horticultural and forestry industries worldwide.

Loxdale has also co-authored overviews on several key areas of biological thought and research. These include the migration and dispersal of insects in relation to their genotype and habitat; intra-clonal genetic variation; rapid evolution in insect populations due to various genetic-ecological mechanisms; population proteomics; and on the improbability of generalism in nature, with special reference to insects The consensus of these articles is that the act of filling a new ecological niche is the fundamental act of specialization for any new species or sub-specific population. Whilst some species may be polyphagous to varying degrees, nevertheless diet breadth tends to involve preference for certain prey items in predatory as well as herbaceous species. Generalism, if it exists, is highly dependent upon an animal's morphology-anatomy, genetics, physiology-biochemistry, and chemistry, especially chemical ecology. This in turn governs the behaviour of the animal concerned and restrains it in terms of its habitat choice and what it can eat. In this light, the age old ‘arms race’ of insect herbivores with plants has led to the plants evolving an armoury of secondary chemical defenses which cause, more often than not, specialisms in terms of host and indeed habitat on the part of the herbivore/s involved. Ultimately, even apparently highly polyphagous species such as the aphid M. persicae, said to attack plants in 40 families, may be because of its highly specialised biochemistry-enzymology.

== Poetry ==
Loxdale has published ten volumes of poetry:

- Fascinating Felines (2002) ISBN 9780954334703
- The Eternal Quest: A celebration of nature in poetry (2003) ISBN 9780954334710
- Blue Skies in Tuscany (2003) ISBN 9780954334727
- Bird Words: Poetic images of wild birds (2003) ISBN 9780954334734
- The Jena Poems (2010) ISBN 9780955392894
- Love and the Sea (2010) ISBN 9780955392887
- Nevisian Days: Poetry from a Caribbean Isle (2011) ISBN 9781908241009
- Bird of Paradise: Selected Poems, 1968-2011 (2011) ISBN 9781908241016
- Zoooo…Living Poems for Children (2012) ISBN 9781908241139
- Red Tulips, Selected Poems, 1999-2016 (2017) ISBN 9781908241511

== Honours and awards ==
Loxdale was made an Honorary Fellow of the Royal Entomological Society in 2016. In 2017 he was awarded an MBE in the Queen's New Year Honours list for services to entomology.
