= Britannia (ship) =

Britannia may refer to any one of a large number of ships:

- Britannia (1772 ship) was launched at South Carolina in 1772 and sailed as a merchant vessel until 1798. She then engaged in whaling until 1808, when she returned to being a merchant vessel until 1816, which is the last year in which she is listed.
- Britannia (1772 EIC ship), a merchantman built by the Bombay Dockyard and rebuilt there in 1778. She then made 12 voyages as an East Indiaman under the ownership of the British East India Company (EIC) before wrecking off Brazil in 1805. She was built of teak and was the first East Indiaman trading between England and India and China to demonstrate the qualities of teak in ship construction.
- Britannia (1774 ship), a 500-ton (bm) merchantman built in 1774 that made five voyages for the British East India Company, on one of which she transported convicts to Australia in a voyage noted for the death toll due to the captain's brutality. She then became a whaler in the South Seas Fishery.
- Britannia (1787 ship) was built in France in 1774. The British captured her in 1781 and she began sailing under the name Sally, first as a transport and then as a West Indiaman. Liverpool merchants purchased her and she became Britannia in 1787. She then sailed to the Baltic and Russia. She was wrecked in 1793.
- Britannia (1782 ship), a 234-ton (bm) vessel launched at Newfoundland in 1782; she was returning from a whaling voyage in July 1793 when a French privateer captured her.
- Britannia (1783 ship), was a ship of 296 tons (bm) launched at Sunderland in 1783. Between 1791 and 1796 she was at Australia. She returned to Britain in 1797. Between 1798 and 1822 she served as a Greenland whaler, and then between 1822 and 1837 as a South Seas whaler. From 1837 she served as a collier, and is no longer listed after 1845.
- Britannia (1783 Maryport ship), launched at Maryport in 1783, made two and possibly three whaling voyages between 1793 and 1797. She is no longer listed in Lloyd's Register after 1795.
- Britannia (1783 Saltcoats ship) was launched at Saltcoats in 1783; she made two slave trading voyages, almost being wrecked in 1793 after the first and the French capturing her in 1795 as she was on her way from Africa to the West Indies on her second slave trading voyage.
- Britannia (1783 whaler), a 301-ton (bm) whaler built in 1783 at Bridport that made two voyages transporting convicts to New South Wales; wrecked in 1806 off the coast of Australia
- Britannia (1788 ship) was launched at New Brunswick in 1788. She was captured in 1797 on her second slave trading voyage.
- Britannia (1788 Scotland ship) was launched in Scotland. She wrecked on 8 February 1794 in the Wreck of the Ten Sail.
- Britannia (1791 ship) was launched at Plymouth 1791. A French privateer captured and burnt her as Britannia was sailing from London to Mogadore via Gibraltar.
- Britannia (1794 ship), was launched on the Thames. She made one voyage for the British East India Company before the French privateer Huron captured her in 1798 on the return leg of a second. HMS Endymion recaptured her shortly thereafter.then became a West Indiaman; she was lost c.1801.
- Britannia (1798 ship) was captured from the Dutch c.1798. She made one complete whaling voyage in 1799–1800 to the South Seas fishery, before the Spanish captured her in 1801 at the Galapagos Islands.
- Britannia (1798 Kircaldy ship) was launched at Kirkcaldy. she spent her career as a West Indiaman. In 1807 a French privateer captured her, but the British Royal Navy recaptured her the next day. Finally, an American privateer captured her in October 1812.
- Britannia (1802 ship) was built at Hull in 1802 and sailed as a West Indiaman. In 1804 she succeeded in repelling the attack of a French privateer in a notable single-ship action, but blew up in an accidental explosion in Cork harbour in 1806.
- Britannia (1806 EIC ship) was an East Indiaman launched in 1806 and wrecked on the Goodwin Sands in 1809
- Britannia (1815 steamship) was Glasgow paddle steamer serving western Scotland ports, and later Londonderry. She was wrecked in 1829 at Donaghadee
- Britannia (1829), a 411-ton (bm) ship-rigged merchantman
- Britannia, a 270-ton (bm) brig that sank off Australia in 1839
- RMS Britannia (1840), a pioneering transatlantic paddle steamer, the first in a class of Cunard Lines ships
- MV Britannia (1983), a tourboat based in Coal Harbour, Vancouver
- MV Britannia (2014), a cruise liner built for P&O Cruises

== See also ==
- Britannia (disambiguation)
- List of ships named Britannic
- Britannia-class steamship, wooden paddlers of Cunard Lines carrying transatlantic passengers and mail, named after the first such ship (1840)
- Britannia Seaways (formerly Tor Britannia), a ro-ro cargo ship of 2000 operated by DFDS Seaways
- Britannia (smack), last and largest Class One Smack
- HMS Britannia, multiple Royal Navy warships
- HMY Britannia (Royal Cutter Yacht), British Royal Racing Yacht 1893–1936
- HMY Britannia, a British Royal Yacht 1954–97
- K1 Britannia, a 1994 replica of the 1893 royal racing yacht HMY Britannia
- SS Britannia, multiple steamships
