= List of shipwrecks in 1793 =

The list of shipwrecks in 1793 includes ships sunk, foundered, wrecked, grounded or otherwise lost during 1793.

table of contents
1793
Jan	Feb	Mar	Apr
May	Jun	Jul	Aug
Sep	Oct	Nov	Dec
Unknown date

== January ==
=== 2 January ===
List of shipwrecks: 2 January 1793
Ship	State	Description
HMS Childers	Royal Navy	French Revolutionary War, Childers Incident: The Childers-class brig-soop was fired upon at Brest, Finistère, France and was slightly damaged.

=== 4 January ===
List of shipwrecks: 4 January 1793
Ship	State	Description
Regina Henrietta	Hamburg	The ship was abandoned in the English Channel 10 leagues (30 nautical miles (56 km)) south east of The Lizard, Cornwall, Great Britain. Her crew survived. She was on a voyage from Hamburg to France and Charleston, South Carolina, United States.

=== 11 January ===
List of shipwrecks: 11 January 1793
Ship	State	Description
Vrow Anna Maria	Hamburg	The ship was driven ashore and wrecked on the south coast of the Isle of Wight, Great Britain. She was on a voyage from Messina, Kingdom of Sicily to Hamburg.

=== 18 January ===
List of shipwrecks: 18 January 1793
Ship	State	Description
Union	United States	The ship was lost in Dingle Bay.

=== 19 January ===
List of shipwrecks: 19 January 1793
Ship	State	Description
Providence	Great Britain	The ship foundered off Barcelona, Spain. Her crew were rescued. She was on a voyage from Saint Petersburg, Russia to Livorno, Grand Duchy of Tuscany.

=== Unknown date ===
List of shipwrecks: Unknown date in January 1793
Ship	State	Description
Adventure	Great Britain	The ship was lost near Brest, Finistère, France. She was on a voyage from Great Yarmouth, Norfolk to a Mediterranean port.
Betsey	Great Britain	The ship foundered off the coast of Jutland. She was on a voyage from Saint Petersburg, Russia to London.
Betty	Ireland	The ship was driven ashore near Hoyle, Cheshire.
Carl	Sweden	The ship was wrecked at Skagen, Denmark. She was on a voyage from Gothenburg to Livorno, Grand Duchy of Tuscany.
Catharine	Ireland	The ship was driven ashore at Fishguard, Pembrokeshire, Great Britain.
Charlotte Johannah	Stettin	The ship sank at Swinemünde, Swedish Pomerania. She was on a voyage from London to Stettin.
Columbine	Great Britain	The ship was driven ashore near Wicklow, Ireland. She was on a voyage from London to Dublin.
Coningham	Great Britain	The ship was wrecked on Bornholm, Denmark.
David	Great Britain	The ship was driven ashore near Swinemünde. She was on a voyage from London to Stettin.
Dolphin	Great Britain	The ship was driven ashore near Hoyle. She was on a voyage from Boston to Belfast, County Antrim, Ireland.
Emas	Portugal	The ship was lost on the Malabar Coast.
Enigheid	Stettin	The ship was lost whilst on a voyage from Riga, Russia to Stettin.
Fanny	Great Britain	The ship foundered in the English Channel off the Isle of Purbeck, Dorset. She was on a voyage from Swanage, Dorset to London.
Friends de Jersey	Great Britain Jersey	The ship was lost off Cherbourg, Seine-Inférieure, France with the loss of all hands. She was on a voyage from Newcastle upon Tyne, Northumberland to Guernsey, Channel Islands.
Friends Goodwill	Great Britain	The ship was driven ashore at Fishguard. She was on a voyage from Ulverston, Lancashire to Cardiff, Glamorgan.
Friendship	Great Britain	The ship foundered in the North Sea with the loss of all 36 people on board whilst on a voyage from London to Whitby, Yorkshire.
Friends Increase	Great Britain	The ship was lost near Beachy Head, Sussex. She was on a voyage from Ipswich, Suffolk to Liverpool, Lancashire.
Garland	Great Britain	The ship was wrecked on the south coast of the Isle of Wight. She was on a voyage from Málaga, Spain to London.
George & Mary	Great Britain	The ship was driven ashore on Sylt, Duchy of Holstein. She was on a voyage from King's Lynn, Norfolk to Danzig.
Gottlielf Gustaf	Stettin	The ship was lost at Stolpe. She was on a voyage from Riga to Stettin.
Hamilton	United States	The ship was driven ashore near Thisted, Denmark. She was on a voyage from New York to Gothenburg, Sweden.
Henry	Great Britain	The ship was driven ashore in the Orkney Islands. She was on a voyage from Saint Petersburg to Liverpool.
Hope	Great Britain Guernsey	The ship was lost whilst on a voyage from Rotterdam, South Holland, Dutch Republic to Guernsey.
Hopewell	Great Britain	The ship was run down and sunk in the English Channel off Portland, Dorset by Enterprize (Great Britain). Her crew were rescued.
Jean	Great Britain	The ship was lost in the Orkney Islands. She was on a voyage from Pillau, Prussia to Liverpool.
Jonge Columbus	Prussia	The ship was driven ashore on the Swedish coast. She was on a voyage from Bristol, Gloucestershire, Great Britain to Königsberg.
Keturah	Ireland	The ship was driven ashore at Fishguard. She was on a voyage from Dublin to London.
Kitty	Great Britain	The ship was driven ashore and wrecked on Goree. Her crew were rescued. She was on a voyage from Maryland, United States to Rotterdam.
La Baron de la Houze	Portugal	The ship was wrecked on the Goodwin Sands, Kent. Her crew were rescued. She was on a voyage from Amsterdam, North Holland, Dutch Republic to Lisbon.
Le Solidad	Spain	The ship was driven ashore near Rye, Sussex. She was on a voyage from Seville to Hamburg.
Le St. Pierre	France	The ship foundered off St. Ives, Cornwall with the loss of all hands. She was on a voyage from Ireland to the West Indies.
London Packet	Great Britain	The ship was driven ashore at Newry, County Antrim. She was on a voyage from Newry to London.
Maria Catarina	Dutch Republic	The ship was driven ashore near Boulogne, Pas-de-Calais, France. She was on a voyage from Spain to Dunkerque, Nord, France and Ostend, West Flanders.
Mary	Great Britain Guernsey	The ship was driven ashore on the coast of France. She was on a voyage from Porto, Portugal to Guernsey.
Nightingale	Great Britain	The ship foundered in the Irish Sea off Holyhead, Anglesey. She was on a voyage from St. Ives, Cornwall to Liverpool.
Pearl	French Navy	The frigate foundered in the Mediterranean Sea between 19 and 25 January.
Postillion	Flag unknown	The ship foundered at Swinemünde.
Providence	Great Britain	The ship was driven ashore on a Danish island. She was on a voyage from "Holbeck" to London.
Providence	Great Britain	The ship was lost near Beachy Head. She was on a voyage from Seville to London.
Resolution	Ireland	The ship was wrecked on the North Bull. She was on a voyage from Lisbon to Dublin.
Robert	Ireland	The ship foundered. Her crew survived. She was on a voyage from Londonderry to Bordeaux.
Rosa	Great Britain	The ship was driven ashore at Fishguard. She was on a voyage from Dublin to Swansea, Glamorgan.
Santa Rita Rosa	Portugal	The ship was driven ashore at Cowes, Isle of Wight. She was on a voyage from Amsterdam to Porto.
Ses Gebroeders Vesser	Dutch Republic	The ship was lost near Pillau. She was on a voyage from Elbing to Amsterdam.
Susannah	Great Britain	The ship was wrecked on the French coast with the loss of all hands. She was on a voyage from Liverpool to Africa.
Swan	Great Britain	The ship was driven ashore at Fishguard. She was on a voyage from Newnham, Gloucestershire to Maryport, Cumberland.
Teynham	Great Britain	The ship was driven ashore and wrecked near Lancaster, Lancashire.
Trial	Great Britain	The ship was driven ashore at Fishguard. She was on a voyage from Ireland to Chichester, Sussex.
Trou & Geloof	Danzig	The ship was driven ashore near Colberg, Prussia. She was on a voyage from Liverpool to Danzig.
Twee Gebroeders	Hanover	The ship was lost on the Long Sand, in the North Sea off the coast of Kent. She was on a voyage from Emden to London.
Two Brothers	Dutch Republic	The ship was driven ashore at Egmond aan Zee, North Holland. She was on a voyage from Amsterdam, North Holland to L'Orient, Morbihan, France.
Two Good Friends	Dutch Republic	The ship was driven ashore and wrecked near Salcombe, Devon with the loss of all but two of her crew. She was on a voyage from Ostend to Cette, Hérault, France.
Valiant	Great Britain	The ship was driven ashore and wrecked on the coast of Norfolk. She was on a voyage from Saint Petersburg to London. Valiant later refloated and was driven ashore again at Saltfleet, Lincolnshire.
Victory	Great Britain	The ship was lost near Colberg. Her crew were rescued.
Unnamed	Flag unknown	The ship was wrecked on the south west coast of Ireland. No lives were lost.

== February ==
=== Unknown date ===
List of shipwrecks: Unknown date in February 1793
Ship	State	Description
Active	Great Britain	The ship foundered in the Irish Sea off Cork, Ireland before 18 February. She was on a voyage from Bristol, Gloucestershire to Cork.
Arthezien Grandededuc	France	The ship was lost at the mouth of the Gironde with the loss of all hands. She was on a voyage from Saint-Domingue to Bordeaux, Gironde.
Christina	Sweden	The ship was lost on the coast of Norway. She was on a voyage from Hull, Yorkshire, Great Britain to Gothenburg.
Eliza	Great Britain	The ship was lost whilst on a voyage from Youghal, County Cork, Ireland to Liverpool, Lancashire.
Esperance	France	The ship was lost near Dénia, Spain. She was on a voyage from L'Orient, Morbihan to Marseille, Bouches-du-Rhône.
Experience or L'Esperance	Dutch Republic	The ship foundered in the Baltic Sea whilst on a voyage from Vaasa Sweden to Dordrecht, South Holland.
Hawke	Great Britain	The ship was driven ashore in the River Seine. She was on a voyage from London to Rouen, Seine-Inférieure, France.
Harriot	Great Britain	The ship was lost in the Bristol Channel. She was on a voyage from Virginia, United States to Bristol.
Harvey	Great Britain	The ship was driven ashore in Chale Bay, Isle of Wight. She was on a voyage from Lisbon, Portugal to London.
Heart of Oak	Great Britain	The ship capsized in the River Frome, Dorset. She was later refloated.
Jenny	Great Britain	The ship was driven ashore and wrecked at Formby, Lancashire. She was on a voyage from Faro, Portugal to Liverpool.
Mary	Great Britain	The ship was driven ashore at Dumfries. She was on a voyage from Waterford, Ireland to Liverpool.
Mercury	Great Britain	The ship was driven ashore on Texel, North Holland, Dutch Republic. She was on a voyage from Porto, Portugal to Amsterdam, North Holland.
Nancy	France	The ship was lost on the Île de Ré, Charente-Inférieure. She was on a voyage from Guadeloupe to Bordeaux.
Nancy and Betsey or Nancy & Betty	Great Britain	The ship foundered in the Bristol Channel off Lundy Island whilst on a voyage from St. Ives, Cornwall to Swansea, Glamorgan.
Prosperity	Great Britain	The ship was lost whilst on a voyage from Youghal to Liverpool.
St. George	Great Britain	War of the First Coalition: The ship was driven ashore and wrecked on the south coast of the Isle of Wight whilst evading two French privateers. She was on a voyage from Lisbon to London.
Unanimity	Great Britain	The ship was lost on the coast of Jutland. She was on a voyage from Saint Petersburg, Russia to London.
Union	Spain	The ship foundered off St. Andero. She was on a voyage from Havana, Cuba to St. Andero.

== March ==
=== 2 March ===
List of shipwrecks: 2 March 1793
Ship	State	Description
Sherburn Castle	Great Britain	The ship was driven ashore and wrecked at Hoylake, Cheshire. She was on a voyage from Liverpool, Lancashire to Africa.

=== 7 March ===
List of shipwrecks: 7 March 1793
Ship	State	Description
Laurel	Great Britain	The ship was driven ashore at Winterton-on-Sea, Norfolk. She was later refloated and taken in to Great Yarmouth, Norfolk.

=== 18 March ===
List of shipwrecks: 18 March 1793
Ship	State	Description
Susannah	Great Britain	The brig was wrecked at Cape de Gatt, Spain. Her crew were rescued. She was on a voyage from Spain to London.

=== 20 March ===
List of shipwrecks: 20 March 1793
Ship	State	Description
Pelican	Great Britain	The privateer capsized and sank in the River Mersey with the loss of 102 of the 134 people on board.

=== 28 March ===
List of shipwrecks: 28 March 1793
Ship	State	Description
Norval	Great Britain	The ship foundered in the Atlantic Ocean (40°30′N 12°20′W). Her crew were rescued by Tavistock (Great Britain).

=== Unknown date ===
List of shipwrecks: Unknown date in March 1793
Ship	State	Description
Ann	Great Britain	The ship sank at Great Yarmouth, Norfolk. She was later refloate3d.
Chesapeak	Great Britain	The ship was wrecked on the French coast. She was on a voyage from London to the Bay of Biscay.
Helena	Great Britain	War of the First Coalition: The ship was captured by a French privateer. She was subsequently driven ashore near Ostend, West Flanders, Dutch Republic. Helena was on a voyage from Hamburg to Liverpool, Lancashire.
Henrietta	Great Britain	The ship was wrecked at Millom, Cumberland.
Laura	Great Britain	The ship was driven ashore at Winterton-on-Sea, Norfolk.
Mary	Great Britain	The ship was driven ashore and wrecked at Liverpool. She was on a voyage from Wexford, Ireland to Liverpool.
Mary and Ann	Great Britain	The stores ship was destroyed by fire in Liverpool Bay. She was on a voyage from Liverpool to Plymouth, Devon.
Otter	Great Britain	The ship ran aground off Great Yarmouth.
Pelham	Great Britain	The ship departed from Plymouth for a port in the north of Ireland. No further trace, presumed foundered with the loss of all hands.
Pelican	Great Britain	The privateer foundered in the River Mersey with the loss of about 60 lives.
HM Cutter Pilote	Great Britain	The ship was driven ashore at Waterford, Ireland .
Pledger	Great Britain	The ship was wrecked at Peterhead, Aberdeenshire. She was on a voyage from London to Inverness.
Ranger	Great Britain	The ship sprang a leak and was abandoned in the North Sea off Great Yarmouth, Norfolk. Her crew were rescued by Ann (Great Britain). Ranger was on a voyage from Sunderland, County Durham to Plymouth.
Resolution	Ireland	The ship was lost whilst on a voyage from Dungarvan, County Antrim to Liverpool.
Upcot	Great Britain	The ship foundered in the Atlantic Ocean off Land's End, Cornwall. She was on a voyage from Cork, Ireland to Falmouth, Cornwall.

== April ==
=== 11 April ===
List of shipwrecks: 11 April 1793
Ship	State	Description
No. 7	Imperial Russian Navy	The transport ship was driven ashore and wrecked at Yevpatoria. Her crew survived. She was on a voyage from Kherson to Sevastopol.

=== Unknown date ===
List of shipwrecks: Unknown date in April 1793
Ship	State	Description
Brothers	Great Britain	The ship was driven ashore and wrecked in the Isles of Scilly. she was on a voyage from Pool, Dorset to Ireland and Newfoundland, British America.
Commerce	Great Britain	The ship was lost in Loughindahl Bay. She was on a voyage from Dublin to Limerick, Ireland.
Grtrude Maria	Denmark	The ship was lost near Boston, Lincolnshire, Great Britain.
Happy Return	Great Britain	The ship was driven ashore at Whitby, Yorkshire.
John	Great Britain Jersey	The ship was driven ashore and wrecked at Guernsey, Channel Islands. She was on a voyage from the United States to Jersey.
Mary	Great Britain	The ship was driven ashore in the Bristol Channel. She was on a voyage from Bristol, Gloucestershire to Africa.
Rebecca	Great Britain	The ship was lost on Tiree, Inner Hebrides. She was on a voyage from New York, United States to Ireland.
Resolution	Great Britain	The ship was driven ashore and wrecked in the Cattewater.
Susannah	Great Britain	The ship was driven ashore near Padstow, Cornwall. She was on a voyage from Youghal, County Cork, Ireland to Southampton, Hampshire.

== May ==
=== 13 May ===
List of shipwrecks: 13 May 1793
Ship	State	Description
Three Brothers	United States	The schooner was wrecked on the Melasses Reef, Caicos Islands.

=== Unknown date ===
List of shipwrecks: Unknown date in May 1793
Ship	State	Description
Vrow Henricke	Dutch Republic	The ship was lost whilst on a voyage from Groningen to London, Great Britain.
Whitby	Great Britain	The ship was wrecked on Scroby Sands, Norfolk.

== June ==
=== 1 June ===
List of shipwrecks: 1 June 1793
Ship	State	Description
HMS Advice	(Kingdom of Great Britain) Royal Navy	The 10-gun cutter was wrecked on the Turneffe Atoll, British Honduras.

== =29 June ==
List of shipwrecks: 29 June 1793
Ship	State	Description
HSwMS Dygden	Swedish Navy	The Kronprins Gustaf Adolf-class ship of the line caught fire, exploded and sank at Karlskrona.

=== Unknown date ===
List of shipwrecks: Unknown date in June 1793
Ship	State	Description
Betsey	Great Britain	The sloop was run down in the Atlantic Ocean off Land's End, Cornwall. She was on a voyage from Dartmouth, Devon to Cork, Ireland. She was later towed in to Mount's Bay

== July ==
=== 6 July ===
List of shipwrecks: 6 July 1793
Ship	State	Description
Albion	Great Britain	The ship was in collision with Amity Hall (Great Britain) off Cape San Antonio, Cuba, and her crew abandoned her. Amity Hall rescued Albion's crew. Albion was on a voyage from Jamaica to Bristol, Gloucestershire.

=== Unknown date ===
List of shipwrecks: Unknown date in July 1793
Ship	State	Description
Beresford	Great Britain	The ship was driven ashore at Farmley Point, Lancashire.
Briton	Great Britain	The ship was driven ashore in the River Thames downstream of Gravesend, Kent.
Christian	Bremen	The ship was lost whilst on a voyage from Bremen to Pool, Dorset, Great Britain.
Le Sans Pareil	France	The ship, a prize of Weymouth (Great Britain), was wrecked at The Lizard, Cornwall, Great Britain.

== August ==
=== 12 August ===
List of shipwrecks: 12 August 1793
Ship	State	Description
African Queen	Great Britain	The ship foundered off Nevis in a hurricane.
Britannia	Great Britain	The ship foundered in the Caribbean Sea off Saint Kitts during a hurricane. Her crew were rescued.
Charlotte	Great Britain Nevis	The sloop was lost in a hurricane at Saint Kitts.
Commerce	Flag unknown	The barque, a prize, was lost in a hurricane at Saint Kitts.
Gustavus Adolphus	Flag unknown	The sloop, a prize, was lost in a hurricane at Saint Kitts.
Hannah	United States	The sloop was lost in a hurricane at Saint Kitts.
Hoppet	(France) Saint Barthélemy	The schooner was lost in a hurricane at Saint Kitts.
Indian Castle	Great Britain Saint Kitts	The sloop was lost in a hurricane at Saint Kitts.
Letitia	Great Britain Antigua	The schooner was lost in a hurricane at Saint Kitts.
Little Jack	Great Britain Saint Kitts	The sloop was lost in a hurricane at Saint Kitts.
Mary	United States	The schooner was lost in a hurricane at Saint Kitts.
Nancy	Great Britain Saint Kitts	The sloop was lost in a hurricane at Saint Kitts.
Nancy and William	Great Britain Nevis	The sloop was lost in a hurricane at Saint Kitts.
Oliver	Great Britain Antigua	The sloop was lost at Saint Kitts.
South Carolina	United States	The ship was lost in a hurricane at Saint Kitts.
William	Flag unknown	The sloop, a prize, was lost in a hurricane at Saint Kitts.

=== 13 August ===
List of shipwrecks: 13 August 1793
Ship	State	Description
Ann	Dutch Republic	The ship was driven ashore in a hurricane at St. Thomas, Virgin Islands. She was later refloated and repaired.
HM Hired armed ship General Ord	(Kingdom of Great Britain) Royal Navy	The ship was wrecked on Norman's Island, Virgin Islands in a hurricane with the loss of all but ten of her crew.

=== 17 August ===
List of shipwrecks: 17 August 1793
Ship	State	Description
Francis & Jane	Great Britain	The ship was lost with all hands.

=== Unknown date ===
List of shipwrecks: Unknown date in August 1793
Ship	State	Description
Charles	Great Britain	The ship ran aground on the Lap Sand, in the Baltic Sea. She was on a voyage from Saint Petersburg, Russia to Bristol, Gloucestershire.
Fortuna	Sweden	The ship foundered in the North Sea off Harwich, Essex, Great Britain. She was on a voyage from Stockholm to Maldon, Essex.
Mary	Great Britain	The ship was lost in the Pentland Firth. She was on a voyage from the Wyre to Saint Petersburg, Russia.
Nancy	Great Britain	The brig was driven ashore and wrecked at Portland, Dorset. She was on a voyage from Plymouth, Devon to Ostend, West Flanders, Dutch Republic.
Pesouton	Great Britain	The brig (450 tons), was carrying a cargo of timber from Calcutta to Rangoon broached and turtled off the coast of Burma in a hurricane, and then broke apart. The wreck washed ashore near "Cape Negrais" in current day Myanmar. Seven survived out of a complement of over 60.
Providence	Great Britain	The brig was driven ashore and wrecked at Scarborough, Yorkshire. Her crew were rescued.
St. Bartholomew	Sweden	The ship was wrecked on the coast of Norfolk, Great Britain. She was on a voyage from Stockholm to London, Great Britain.
Three Friends	Great Britain	The ship was driven ashore at Lymington, Hampshire. She was on a voyage from London to North Carolina, United States. She was later refloated.
Tweed	Great Britain	The ship was driven ashore on The Shingles, Isle of Wight. She was on a voyage from Sunderland, County Durham to Bridport, Dorset.
Westberry	Great Britain	The ship was wrecked at Arkhangelsk, Russia. Her crew were rescued. She was on a voyage from Arkhangelsk to Bristol, Gloucestershire.

== September ==
=== 2 September ===
List of shipwrecks: 2 September 1793
Ship	State	Description
Unnamed	Sweden	The ship was wrecked at Margate, Kent, Great Britain. Twenty-four of her crew were rescued.

=== 3 September ===
List of shipwrecks: 3 September 1793
Ship	State	Description
Commune	Great Britain	The brig foundered in the North Sea off Great Yarmouth, Norfolk. Her crew were rescued by an American vessel.

=== 20 September ===
List of shipwrecks: 20 September 1793
Ship	State	Description
Hermione	French Navy	The Concorde-class frigate ran aground off Le Croisic, Loire-Inférieure and was wrecked.

=== Unknown date ===
List of shipwrecks: Unknown date in September 1793
Ship	State	Description
Ann	Ireland	The ship was driven ashore near "The Roll". She was on a voyage from Kinsale, County Cork to Saint Petersburg, Russia.
Cæsar	Great Britain	The ship was driven ashore near Kirkwall, Orkney Islands. She was on a voyage from Saint Petersburg to Liverpool, Lancashire.
De Jan Poppes	Dutch Republic	The ship was driven ashore and wrecked at Dartmouth, Devon, Great Britain. She was on a voyage from Amsterdam, North Holland to Ferrol, Spain.
Good Intent	Great Britain	The ship was driven ashore and wrecked at Lowestoft, Suffolk. She was on a voyage from Arundel, Sussex to Newcastle upon Tyne, Northumberland.
John & George	Great Britain	The ship was lost at Memel, Prussia.
Minerva	Great Britain	The ship ran aground on the Long Sand, in the North Sea off the coast of Essex. Her crew were rescued. She was on a voyage from London to Genoa. She was later refloated and taken in to Margate, Kent.
Nicholas & Jane	Great Britain	The ship was driven ashore on the coast of Lapland.
Volgass Volkhause	Sweden	The ship was wrecked on the Goodwin Sands, Kent with the loss of ten of her crew. She was on a voyage from Stockholm to Dublin, Ireland.

== October ==
=== 4 October ===
List of shipwrecks: 4 October 1793
Ship	State	Description
Edward	United States	The ship foundered in the North Sea with the loss of all hands. She was on a voyage from Saint Petersburg, Russia to Philadelphia, Pennsylvania.

=== 8 October ===
List of shipwrecks: 8 October 1793
Ship	State	Description
Nancy	Great Britain	The ship was driven ashore and wrecked at Riga, Russia.

=== 12 October ===
List of shipwrecks: 12 October 1793
Ship	State	Description
Impérieuse	French Navy	The Minerve-class frigate was scuttled in the Gulf of Spezia. She was subsequently salvaged by the British, repaired and entered Royal Navy service as HMS Imperieuse.

=== 20 October ===
List of shipwrecks: 20 October 1793
Ship	State	Description
Commerce	Great Britain	The schooner foundered in Montego Bay during a hurricane.
Fanny	Great Britain	The schooner foundered in Montego Bay during a hurricane.
Lord Stanley	Great Britain	The schooner foundered in Montego Bay during a hurricane.
Mary Ann	Great Britain	The full-rigged ship foundered in Montego Bay during a hurricane.
Mary Ann	Great Britain	The ship foundered west of Jamaica. She was on a voyage from Jamaica to London.
Mary-Ann	Great Britain	The full-rigged ship was wrecked at Montego Bay, Jamaica.
Mary-Ann	Great Britain	The schooner was wrecked at Montego Bay, Jamaica.
Palliser	Great Britain	The ship was wrecked in the Great River, Jamaica during a hurricane.
Polly	Great Britain	The brig foundered in Montego Bay during a hurricane.
Prince of Orange	Great Britain	The brig foundered in Montego Bay during a hurricane.
Prudence	Great Britain	The sloop foundered in Montego Bay during a hurricane.
Ranger	Great Britain	The sloop foundered in Montego Bay during a hurricane.

=== Unknown date ===
List of shipwrecks: Unknown date in October 1793
Ship	State	Description
Ann	Ireland	The ship was lost at Halmstadt, Sweden. Five of her crew were rescued. She was on a voyage from Belfast, County Antrim to Riga, Russia.
Arethusa	Great Britain	The ship was wrecked at "Rodahl", Jutland with the loss of all crew. She was on a voyage from Saint Petersburg, Russia to London.
Betardigkeit	Denmark	The ship was driven ashore on Hogland, Russia. She was on a voyage from Copenhagen to Saint Petersburg.
Britannia	Great Britain	The ship was lost whilst on a voyage from Arkhangelsk, Russia to a British port.
Britannia	Great Britain	War of the First Coalition: The ship was captured and burnt by a French privateer. She was on a voyage from London to Gibraltar and Mogadore, Morocco.
Brothers	Great Britain	War of the First Coalition: The ship was captured and burnt by the privateer Marseille (France). She was on a voyage from Cádiz, Spain to Newfoundland, British America.
Capelin	Great Britain	The ship was wrecked at St. Lucar, Spain.
Catherine	Great Britain	The ship ran aground on the Burbo Bank, in Liverpool Bay. She was on a voyage from a Baltic port to Liverpool, Lancashire.
Jonathan	Great Britain	The ship was driven ashore at Irvine, Ayrshire. She was on a voyage from Jamaica to the Clyde.
Jupiter	Great Britain	The ship was captured by Réunion (French Navy) and ordered in to Cherbourg, Seine-Inférieure; However, she foundered before she reached port. Jupiter was on a voyage from Virginia, United States to London.
King George	India	The ship was struck by lightning and destroyed by fire in the Pearl River, China.
Kirkham	Great Britain	The ship was wrecked on the coast of Jutland.
Latona	Great Britain	The ship was lost in the Baltic Sea with the loss of seven of her crew.
Leviathan	Great Britain	The ship was wrecked on Gotland, Sweden. She was on a voyage from Saint Petersburg to Borrowstounness, Lothian.
Marianne	Great Britain	The brig was driven ashore at Étaples, Pas-de-Calais, France on or about 13 October. She was on a voyage from Halifax, Nova Scotia, British America to Dover, Kent. She was refloated, and arrived at Dover on 17 October.
Mary-Ann	Great Britain	The schooner foundered in Montego Bay, Jamaica during a hurricane.
Mercury	Great Britain	The ship was driven ashore at Danzig. She was on a voyage from London to Königsberg, Prussia.
Minerva	Great Britain	The ship foundered off the north coast of Scotland. Her crew were rescued. She was on a voyage from a Baltic port to Liverpool.
Morning Star	Prussia	The ship was driven ashore on Saltholm, Denmark. She was on a voyage from Riga to Amsterdam, North Holland, Dutch Republic.
Nancy	Great Britain	The ship was driven ashore near Crinan, Argyllshire. She was on a voyage from "Wyburg" to Liverpool.
Œconomy	Great Britain	The ship was driven ashore and wrecked near Rye, Sussex.
Perseverance	Great Britain	The ship was wrecked on the Kensigg Sands, Glamorgan. She was on a voyage from British Honduras to London.
Rambler	Great Britain	The ship ran aground and sank off Dragør, Denmark. She was on a voyage from Sunderland, County Durham to Königsberg.
Rust van het Vaderland	Dutch Republic	The ship was driven ashore on the coast of Jutland. She was on a voyage from "Wyburg" to Dort, South Holland.
Sophia Christina	Prussia	The ship was driven ashore and wrecked at Skagen with the loss of all but one of her crew. She was on a voyage from Königsberg to London.
Susannah	Great Britain	The ship was lost near Lytham St. Annes, Lancashire. She was on a voyage from Saint Petersburg to Liverpool.
Thetis	Great Britain	The ship was driven ashore near Skagen, Denmark. Her crew were rescued. She was on a voyage from Aberdeen to Danzig.
True Briton	Great Britain	The ship was lost on the Dutch coast. She was on a voyage from London to Rotterdam, South Holland, Dutch Republic.
Two Brothers	Ireland	The ship foundered in the Atlantic Ocean 50 leagues (150 nautical miles (280 km)) west of Cape Clear Island, County Cork. Her crew were rescued by Fortitude (Great Britain). Two Brothers was on a voyage from Waterford to Newfoundland.
Two Sisters	Great Britain	The ship was driven ashore near Memel. She was on a voyage from Narva, Russia to Liverpool.
Vreyheid	Sweden	The ship was wrecked on Møn, Denmark. She was on a voyage from St. Ubes, Portugal to Karlskrona.
Wilhelmina	Sweden	The ship was wrecked near the "Kole" whilst on a voyage from London to Norrköping. Her crew were rescued.
Williamson	Great Britain	The ship was wrecked on Læsø, Denmark. She was on a voyage from Memel, Prussia to Whitehaven, Cumberland.
Wilmington	United States	The ship foundered off Tybee Island, Georgia. She was on a voyage from Savannah, Georgia to Liverpool.

== November ==
=== 6 November ===
List of shipwrecks: 6 November 1793
Ship	State	Description
Druid	Great Britain	The ship was wrecked on the Goodwin Sands, Kent. Her crew were rescued. She was on a voyage from Saint Vincent to London.

=== 9 November ===
List of shipwrecks: 9 November 1793
Ship	State	Description
Madona	Great Britain	The ship ran aground on the Goodwin Sands, Kent and was wrecked with the loss of fifteen of her crew. There were some survivors. She was on a voyage from Ostend, West Flanders, Dutch Republic to London.

=== 17 November ===
List of shipwrecks: 17 November 1793
Ship	State	Description
John and Mary	Great Britain	The ship departed from Falmouth, Cornwall for a port in "Italy". No further trace, presumed foundered with the loss of all hands.

=== 20 November ===
List of shipwrecks: 20 November 1793
Ship	State	Description
Princess Mary	Great Britain	The ship was lost at Cape Ray, Newfoundland, British America. She was on a voyage from Quebec City, Lower Canada, British America to Cádiz, Spain.

=== 21 November ===
List of shipwrecks: 21 November 1793
Ship	State	Description
Adventure	Great Britain	The ship departed Saint Croix for a port in North Carolina, United States. No further trace, presumed foundered in the Atlantic Ocean with the loss of all hands.

=== 23 November ===
List of shipwrecks: 23 November 1793
Ship	State	Description
Fanny	Great Britain	The ship foundered in the Atlantic Ocean whilst on a voyage from Quebec, British North America to Cádiz, Spain. Her crew were rescued.

=== 28 November ===
List of shipwrecks: 28 November 1793
Ship	State	Description
Scipion	French Navy	The Téméraire-class ship of the line was destroyed by fire at Livorno, Grand Duchy of Tuscany.

=== 30 November ===
List of shipwrecks: 30 November 1793
Ship	State	Description
York	Great Britain	A fire at Sierra Leone destroyed the stores ship.

=== Unknown date ===
List of shipwrecks: Unknown date in November 1793
Ship	State	Description
Active	Great Britain	The ship was lost near Aberdeen. She was on a voyage from London to Aberdeen.
Alexander	Great Britain	The ship was lost in the Isle of Man.
Amity	Great Britain	The ship was wrecked on Gotland, Sweden whilst on a voyage from Saint Petersburg, Russia to Hull, Yorkshire.
Ariel	Sweden	The ship was wrecked on the Goodwin Sands, Kent Great Britain. She was on a voyage from Barcelona, Spain to Leith, Lothian, Great Britain.
Capelin	Great Britain	The ship was driven ashore near St. Lucar, Spain.
Cavendish	Great Britain	The ship was lost on the Welsh coast. She was on a voyage from Liverpool, Lancashire to Tortola.
Daphne	Great Britain	The ship was driven ashore at Guernsey, Channel Islands and was severely damaged. She was on a voyage from Rotterdam, South Holland, Dutch Republic to Guernsey. She was refloated and taken in to Guernsey.
Elizabeth	Great Britain	The ship foundered at Memel, East Prussia. She was on a voyage from Memel to Dover, Kent.
Fair Lady	Hamburg	The ship ran aground on the Goodwin Sands. She was on a voyage from Hamburg to Lisbon, Portugal. Fair Lady was later refloated and taken in to Ramsgate, Kent.
Fellowship Hall	Great Britain	The ship was driven ashore in the Firth of Forth.
Finaneen	Sweden	The ship was wrecked on Scroby Sands, Norfolk, Great Britain. She was on a voyage from Stockholm to Lisbon.
Fortune	(Denmark) Norway	The ship was lost on the coast of Scotland. She was on a voyage from Norway to Barcelona, Spain.
George & Harriot	United States	The ship was driven ashore near Barfleur, Manche, France. She was on a voyage from Le Havre to Philadelphia, Pennsylvania.
Harlequin	Great Britain	The ship was driven ashore in Glenluce Bay. She was on a voyage from Liverpool to Belfast, County Antrim, Ireland.
Hayle Trader	Great Britain	The ship foundered in the Bristol Channel off The Mumbles, Glamorgan. She was on a voyage from Bristol, Gloucestershire to Hayle, Cornwall.
Helvetia	Hamburg	The ship was driven ashore in the Elbe. She was on a voyage from Hamburg to London.
Hero	Ireland	The ship was lost near Londonderry. She was on a voyage from Saint Petersburg to Londonderry.
Industry	Great Britain	The ship was lost near Wexford, Ireland. She was on a voyage from Bristol to Dublin, Ireland.
Juno	Great Britain	The ship was driven ashore at Deerness, Orkney Islands.
Kitty	Great Britain	The ship was lost west of Boulogne, Pas-de-Calais, France with the loss of ten lives. She was on a voyage from Limerick, Ireland to London.
Liberty	Great Britain	The ship was wrecked on the coast of Sardinia. She was on a voyage from Cagliari to Oneglia, Kingdom of Sardinia.
London Packet	Great Britain	The ship foundered at Porto, Portugal.
Maria	Great Britain	The ship foundered in the Irish Sea off Bardsey Island, Pembrokeshire. She was on a voyage from Dartmouth, Devon to Liverpool.
Mary	Great Britain	The ship sprang a leak. She put into the River Foyle, Ireland, where she capsized.
Morva	Great Britain	The ship was lost near St Davids, Pembrokeshire. She was on a voyage from Cardigan to London.
Nabby	Great Britain	The ship foundered north of Ireland. All on board survived. She was on a voyage from Leith to Virginia, United States.
Mary	Great Britain	The ship sprang a leak and put into the River Foyle, Ireland, where she capsized. Mary was on a voyage from Liverpool to Galway, Ireland.
Peggy	Great Britain	The transport ship was driven ashore and wrecked at Nieuwpoort, West Flanders, Dutch Republic.
Recovery	Great Britain	The ship was driven ashore near Dunbar, Lothian. She was on a voyage from Cádiz, Spain to Leith.
Selby	Great Britain	The ship foundered off the coast of Norway whilst on a voyage from Arkhangelsk, Russia to Hull. Her crew were rescued.
Susannah	Great Britain	The ship foundered at Kristiansand, Norway. She was on a voyage from Arkhangelsk to Amsterdam.
Travellor	Great Britain	The ship was wrecked on Gotland whilst on a voyage from Saint Petersburg to North Shields, Northumberland.
Vrude	Dutch Republic	The ship was driven ashore near Aldeburgh, Suffolk, Great Britain.
Waterford Packet	Ireland	The ship struck a rock at Trepassey, Newfoundland, British North America and foundered.
William	Great Britain	The ship was driven ashore and wrecked at Happisburgh, Norfolk. She was on a voyage from Memel to Great Yarmouth, Norfolk.
William & Robert	Great Britain	The ship ran aground off Kronstadt, Sweden. Sew was on a voyage from Saint Petersburg to London. William & Robert was later refloated and returned to Saint Petersburg.
Two unnamed vessels	United States	The ships were driven ashore in the Mississippi River.ref name=Times091193/>

== December ==
=== 2 December ===
List of shipwrecks: 2 December 1793
Ship	State	Description
Eliza	Great Britain	The ship was wrecked on the Phillips Reef. Her crew were rescued. She was on a voyage from Saint Vincent to the Bahamas.

=== 5 December ===
List of shipwrecks: 5 December 1793
Ship	State	Description
HMS Druid	Great Britain	The Hermione-class frigate ran aground near Saint-Malo, Ille-et-Vilaine, France. She was refloated and found to be severely leaky. She put in to Plymouth, Devon for repairs.

=== 10 December ===
List of shipwrecks: 10 December 1793
Ship	State	Description
Blaydes	Great Britain	The ship departed from Liverpool, Lancashire for Africa. No further trace, presumed foundered in the Atlantic Ocean with the loss of all hands.
Thomas	Great Britain	The ship foundered with the loss of three of her crew. She was on a voyage from Madeira to Porto, Portugal, or Ostend, West Flanders, Dutch Republic.

=== 17 December ===
List of shipwrecks: 17 December 1793
Ship	State	Description
Jonk Vrow Sarah	Dutch Republic	The ship was destroyed by fire at Porto Santo Island, Azores. Her crew survived. She was on a voyage from Amsterdam, North Holland to Surinam.

=== 18 December ===
List of shipwrecks: 18 December 1793
Ship	State	Description
Auguste	French Navy	Siege of Toulon. Siege of Toulon: The corvette was burnt at Toulon, Var.
Caroline	French Navy	Siege of Toulon: The corvette was burnt at Toulon.
Centaure	French Navy	Siege of Toulon: The Centaure-class ship of the line was burnt at Toulon.
Destin	French Navy	Siege of Toulon: The third rate was burnt at Toulon.
Duguay-Trouin	French Navy	Siege of Toulon: The Téméraire-class ship of the line was burnt at Toulon.
Héros	French Navy	Siege of Toulon: The ship-of-the-line was burnt at Toulon.
Iris	French Navy	Siege of Toulon: The Magicienne-class frigate was burnt at Toulon.
Suffisant	French Navy	Siege of Toulon: The Pégase-class ship of the line was burnt at Toulon.
Le Triomphant	French Navy	Siege of Toulon: The ship of the line was burnt at Toulon.
Montréal	French Navy	Siege of Toulon: The Niger-class frigate was burnt at Toulon.
Thémistocle	French Navy	Siege of Toulon: The Téméraire-class ship of the line was burnt at Toulon.
Tricolore	French Navy	Siege of Toulon: The Téméraire-class ship of the line was burnt at Toulon.

=== 30 December ===
List of shipwrecks: Unknown date in December 1793
Ship	State	Description
Nymphe	French Navy	The Nymphe-class frigate was wrecked near Noirmoutier, Vendée.

=== Unknown date ===
List of shipwrecks: 30 December 1793
Ship	State	Description
Ann	Great Britain	The ship foundered in the Atlantic Ocean. Her crew were rescued. She was on a voyage from New York, United States to Greenock, Renfrewshire.
Britannia	Great Britain	The ship was wrecked at Liverpool, Lancashire. She was on a voyage from Grenada to Liverpool.
Charlotte	Great Britain	The ship was wrecked on the Legus Bar.
Clarendon	Great Britain	The ship was wrecked on the Norwegian coast with the loss of fourteen of her crew. She was on a voyage from Arkhangelsk, Russia to Sheerness, Kent.
Dorothea and Margaretta	(Denmark) Norway	The ship was lost near Southwold, Suffolk, Great Britain. She was on a voyage from London to Bergen.
Eliza Catharina	Lübeck	The ship was lost near Reval, Russia. She was on a voyage from Lübeck to Saint Petersburg, Russia.
Gorleston	Great Britain	The ship was driven ashore and wrecked at Great Yarmouth, Norfolk.
Kirkham	Great Britain	The ship was wrecked on the coast of Jutland. She was on a voyage from a Baltic port to Liverpool.
Liberty	Great Britain	The ship ran aground on the Middle Ground and was severely damaged. She was on a voyage from Antigua to London. Liberty was later refloated and taken in to Ramsgate, Kent.
Margaret	Great Britain	The ship departed from Youghal, County Cork, Ireland for Liverpool. No further trace, presumed foundered with the loss of all hands.
Mary	Great Britain	The ship was wrecked near Aberdeen.
Mary	Great Britain	The ship was lost at Porto. She was on a voyage from Newfoundland, British America to Porto.
Mary	Great Britain	The ship was wrecked at Barcelona, Spain.
Mary-Ann	Ireland	The ship was wrecked on the Norwegian coast. She was on a voyage from Christiansand, Norway to Sligo.
Nancy	Great Britain	The ship was lost near Málaga, Spain. She was on a voyage from Málaga to London.
Oporto Packet	Portugal	The ship foundered in the Irish Sea off Wicklow, Ireland whilst on a voyage from Porto to Dublin, Ireland.
Penelope	Great Britain	The ship was driven ashore near Great Yarmouth.
Pigmy	Great Britain	The cutter was lost at Plymouth, Devon.
Rebecca	Great Britain	The ship was wrecked near Ystad, Sweden.
Roebuck	Ireland	The ship sank at Porto. She was on a voyage from Cork to Porto.
Sally	Great Britain	The ship was lost near Liverpool. She was on a voyage from Youghal, County Cork, Ireland to Liverpool.
Sally	Great Britain	The ship was lost on the North Bank, in Liverpool Bay with the loss of all hands. She was on a voyage from Barmouth, Carnarvonshire to Liverpool.
Soli Deo Gloria	Danzig	The ship was wrecked off Bornholm, Denmark whilst on a voyage from Danzig to London.
St. Joseph y Animas	Spain	The ship foundered whilst on a voyage from Bilbao to Bristol, Gloucestershire, Great Britain.
St Pedro Telmo	Spain	The ship foundered whilst on a voyage from Bilbao to Bristol. Her crew were rescued.
Unity	Great Britain	The ship foundered in the Atlantic Ocean off Padstow, Cornwall with the loss of eight of her crew. She was on a voyage from Newfoundland to Teignmouth, Devon.
Wandelar	Hamburg	The ship was driven ashore and wrecked on the coast of Norfolk. She was on a voyage from Hamburg to Genoa and Livorno, Grand Duchy of Tuscany.
Wilhelmina	Prussia	The ship foundered in the Baltic Sea 9 nautical miles (17 km) off Königsberg whilst on a voyage from London, Great Britain to Königsberg.
William	Great Britain	The ship struck a sandbank and foundered in the North Sea off Great Yarmouth with the loss of 24 lives. She was on a voyage from London to Leith, Lothian.
Unamed	Hamburg	The ship was lost in the Gulf of Finland. She was on a voyage from Hamburg to Saint Petersburg.

== Unknown date ==
List of shipwrecks: Unknown date in 1793
Ship	State	Description
Active	Great Britain	The ship was wrecked at Montego Bay, Jamaica.
Baillie de Suffrien	France	The ship foundered whilst on a voyage from Virginia, United States to Bordeaux, Gironde. Her crew were rescued by a British vessel.
Betsey	United States	The ship was lost whilst on a voyage from Philadelphia, Pennsylvania, to New York.
British King	Great Britain	The ship collided with Navigator (Great Britain and sank in the River Cocle. Her crew were rescued.
Brothers	Great Britain	The ship foundered in the Gulf of Florida. She was on a voyage from Jamaica to Liverpool, Lancashire.
Caractacus	Great Britain	The ship was driven ashore at Ferryland, Newfoundland.
Carnatic	Great Britain	The ship was lost whilst on a voyage from Liverpool to Africa.
Charlotte	Great Britain	The schooner was lost whilst on a voyage from Quebec City, Lower Canada to Halifax, Nova Scotia, British America.
Christopher	France	The ship struck an anchor and sank at Saint Croix, Virgin Islands.
Commerce	United States	The ship was wrecked on the Arabian coast at "Chancelly".
Commerce	Great Britain	The schooner was wrecked at Montego Bay, Jamaica.
Dregsterland	Dutch East India Company	The East Indiaman was lost at the Cape of Good Hope.
Edward	Great Britain	The ship was lost on the Barnegat Shoals, off the coast of New Jersey, United States.
Elizabeth	(Denmark) Danish Asiatic Company	The ship was lost in the Bengal River.
Emerald	Great Britain	The ship was holed by her anchor and sank in Martha Bay, Jamaica.
Falquener	Great Britain	The ship foundered in the Atlantic Ocean. She was on a voyage from Jamaica to North Carolina.
Fanny	Great Britain	The ship was lost at Grenada with the loss of all but two of her crew.
Fanny	Great Britain	The schooner was wrecked at Montego Bay, Jamaica.
Friendship	Great Britain	The ship was driven ashore at Bridlington, East Riding of Yorkshire.
General Clark	Great Britain	The ship was lost on the Florida Reef. Her crew were rescued. She was on a voyage from Jamaica to Savannah, Georgia, United States.
Governor	Great Britain Bermuda	The whaler was lost at Port Desire, Brazil. Her crew were rescued.
Grand Sachem	United States	The snow was wrecked on Barbuda. She was on a voyage from Saint Helena to Salem, Massachusetts.
Greyhound	Great Britain	The ship foundered in the Atlantic Ocean whilst on a voyage from Spain to Virginia.
Hannah	Great Britain	The ship was lost on Long Island, New York, United States. She was on a voyage from Cap François, Saint-Domingue to Wilmington, Delaware, United States.
Harriot	Great Britain	The ship foundered in the Atlantic Ocean off Newfoundland, British North America. Her crew were rescued. She was on a voyage from Newfoundland to New York, or from Bristol, Gloucestershire to New York.
Heart of Oak	Great Britain	The ship capsized in the Atlantic Ocean. She was on a voyage from Dominica to Saint Kitts, where she was to join a convoy for Liverpool.
Hornett	Great Britain	The ship was lost at Newfoundland. She was on a voyage from St. Ubes, Portugal to Newfoundland.
Hope	Great Britain	The ship was driven ashore on the Virginia Capes by the privateer Sans Culotte (France) and was wrecked. Her crew were rescued. She was on a voyage from Bermuda to Virginia.
Industry	Great Britain	The ship was lost in Delaware Bay. She was on a voyage from France to Falmouth, Cornwall and Philadelphia, Pennsylvania.
Jamaica Packet	Great Britain	The ship capsized in the Atlantic Ocean. Her crewwere rescued. She was on a voyage from Jamaica to Liverpool.
Jean Bart	France	The ship was driven ashore in the Ganges.
Langrist	Great Britain	The ship was wrecked at Montego Bay, Jamaica.
Lewis	Great Britain	The ship was driven ashore on St. John's Island, British America.
L'Hirondelle	France	The ship was lost on the coast of Africa with the loss of a crew member. She was on a voyage from France to Africa and the West Indies.
London Packet	Great Britain	The ship was wrecked on the Carysfort Reef. She was on a voyage from Jamaica to Philadelphia, Pennsylvania.
Lord Stanley	Great Britain	The schooner was wrecked at Montego Bay, Jamaica.
Maria	Great Britain	The ship foundered in the Atlantic Ocean with the loss of a crew member. She was on a voyage from London to Newfoundland.
Mercury	Great Britain	The whaler was lost off Mozambique. She was on a voyage from London to the South Seas.
Nancy	United States	The ship was lost on the Banks of Curritock. Her crew were rescued. She was on a voyage from Jamaica to Virginia.
Olive Branch	Great Britain	The ship foundered whilst bound for Boston.
Orono	Great Britain	The ship foundered in the Atlantic Ocean. She was on a voyage from Liverpool to Virginia.
Pallas	Great Britain Jamaica	The privateer was wrecked on the Auklin Keys with the loss of all but three of her crew.
Palliseer	Great Britain	The ship was wrecked at Montego Bay, Jamaica.
Peggy	United States	The ship sank in the Delaware River. She was on a voyage from Philadelphia to Savannah.
Polly	United States	The sloop was driven ashore crewless at Beaufort, North Carolina before 16 July.
Polly	Great Britain	The brig was wrecked at Montego Bay, Jamaica.
Prince of Orange	Great Britain	The brig was wrecked at Montego Bay, Jamaica.
Prudence	Great Britain	The sloop was wrecked at Jamaica.
Ranger	Great Britain	The sloop was wrecked at Jamaica.
Recovery	Great Britain	The ship was lost at British Honduras. She was on a voyage from Bristol to British Honduras.
Recovery	Great Britain	African slave trade: The slave ship was driven ashore and wrecked on Tortola before 8 October.
Roman Emperor	Great Britain	War of the First Coalition: The ship was captured by a French privateer. She was subsequently run ashore on Guadeloupe.
Royal George	Great Britain	The ship was lost on the American coast. She was on a voyage from Jamaica to the United States.
Sterreshans	Dutch East India Company	The East Indiaman was lost at the Cape of Good Hope. She was on a voyage from Batavia to Amsterdam.
St. Joseph	United States	The ship was sunk by ice in the Delaware River. She was on a voyage from Philadelphia to Cuba.
Swallow	Great Britain	The ship was lost near Sandy Hook, New Jersey. She was on a voyage from Antigua to New York, United States.
Sydney	United States	The ship, a prize of Pallas ( (Kingdom of Great Britain) Jamaica) was wrecked on the Auklin Keys.
Two Brothers	Ireland	The ship foundered in the Atlantic Ocean 50 leagues (130 nmi; 240 km) west of Cape Clear Island, County Cork, Ireland whilst on a voyage from Waterford to Newfoundland. Her crew were rescued by Fortitude (Great Britain).
Two Brothers	United States	The ship, a prize of Pallas ( (Kingdom of Great Britain) Jamaica) was wrecked on the Auklin Keys.
Waterford Packet	Ireland	The ship struck a sunken rock in Trepassey Bay ad foundered. She was on a voyage from Waterford to Newfoundland.
Young Eagle	Great Britain	The ship was wrecked at Montego Bay, Jamaica.
Yucaton	Great Britain	The ship was lost at British Honduras. She was on a voyage from British Honduras to Hull, Yorkshire.
Zeeland	Dutch East India Company	The East Indiaman was lost at the Cape of Good Hope. She was on a voyage from China to Amsterdam.
