= List of ship launches in 1774 =

The list of ship launches in 1774 includes a chronological list of some ships launched in 1774.

Date	Ship	Class	Builder	Location	Country	Notes
14 January	Maréchal de Broglie	East Indiaman		Lorient	Kingdom of France	For Compagnie des Indes.
29 March	Cumberland	Elizabeth-class ship of the line	Adam Hayes	Deptford Dockyard	Great Britain	For Royal Navy.
13 April	Surprise	Enterprise-class frigate	Nicholas Phillips	Woolwich Dockyard	Great Britain	For Royal Navy.
24 April	Roebuck	Roebuck-class ship	William Gray	Chatham Dockyard	Great Britain	For Royal Navy.
26 April	Piatyi	Platyi-class frigate	S. I. Afanaseyev	Novokhoperskaya	Russia	For Imperial Russian Navy.
2 May	Eagle	Intrepid-class ship of the line	John & William Wells	Rotherhithe	Great Britain	For Royal Navy.
2 May	Shestoi	Platyi-class frigate	S. I. Afanaseyev	Nofokhoperskaya	Russia	For Imperial Russian Navy.
10 May	Princesa do Brasil	Fifth rate		Lisbon	Portugal	For Portuguese Navy.
10 May	Torta	Fifth rate		Lisbon	Portugal	For Portuguese Navy.
15 May	Diligenza	Leon Trionfante-class ship of the line		Venice	Republic of Venice	For Venetian Navy.
18 May	Blagopoluchie	Asiia-class ship of the line	V. Gunion	Arkhangelsk	Russia	For Imperial Russian Navy.
18 May	Slava Rossii	Aziia-class ship of the line	V. Gunion	Arkhangelsk	Russia	For Imperial Russian Navy.
20 May	Forza	Leon Trionfante-class ship of the line		Venice	Republic of Venice	For Venetian Navy.
21 May	Khrabryi	Aziia-class ship of the line	V. Gunion	Arkhangelsk	Russia	For Imperial Russian Navy.
21 May	Sviatoi Nikolai	Aziia-class ship of the line	V. Gunion	Arkhangelsk	Russia	For Imperial Russian Navy.
21 May	Tvyordyi	Aziia-class ship of the line	V. Gunion	Arkhangelsk	Russia	For Imperial Russian Navy.
22 May	Centurion	Salisbury-class ship of the line	Barnard & Turner	Harwich	Great Britain	For Royal Navy.
27 May	Hector	Royal Oak-class ship of the line	Adams	Deptford	Great Britain	For Royal Navy.
28 May	Diamond	Lowestoffe-class frigate	Hodgson & Co.	Hull	Great Britain	For Royal Navy.
31 May	Sviatoi Mikhail	Modified Pavel-class frigate	V. Gunion	Arkhangelsk	Russia	For Imperial Russian Navy.
14 June	Alcmène	Alcmène-class frigate	Jean-Baptiste Dournet-Revest	Toulon	Kingdom of France	For French Navy.
25 June	Vengeance	Royal Oak-class ship of the line	John Randall	Rotherhithe	Great Britain	For Royal Navy.
22 July	Alarm	Sixth rate	Peter Edwards	Amsterdam	Dutch Republic	For Dutch Navy.
23 July	Hillsborough	East Indiaman	Perry	Blackwall Yard	Great Britain	For British East India Company.
26 July	Pospeshnyi	Modified Pavel-class frigate	M. D. Portnov	Arkhangelsk	Russia	For Imperial Russian Navy.
18 August	Schastlivyi	Pavel-class frigate	V. Gunion	Arkhangelsk	Russia	For Imperial Russian Navy.
23 August	Boreas	Mermaid-class frigate	Blaydes & Hodgson	Hull	Great Britain	For Royal Navy.
23 August	Experiment	Experiment-class ship of the line	John Barnard	Deptford	Great Britain	For Royal Navy.
24 August	Enterprise	Enterprise-class frigate	Adam Hayes	Deptford Dockyard	Great Britain	For Royal Navy.
September	Brillant	Solitaire-class ship of the line		Brest	Kingdom of France	For French Navy.
6 October	Piet Hein	Fourth rate		Amsterdam	Dutch Republic	For Dutch Navy.
6 October	Vigilant	Intrepid-class ship of the line	Adams	Bucklers Hard	Great Britain	For Royal Navy.
22 October	Solitaire	Solitaire-class ship of the line	Chevalier Antoine Groignard	Brest	Kingdom of France	For French Navy.
19 November	Isis	Portland-class frigate	John Henniker & Co.	Chatham Dockyard	Great Britain	For Royal Navy.
4 December	Renown	Portland-class frigate	Robert Fabian	Southampton	Great Britain	For Royal Navy.
17 December	Nonsuch	Intrepid-class ship of the line	Israel Pownolll	Plymouth Dockyard	Great Britain	For Royal Navy.
Unknown date	Angel de la Guarda	Third rate		Bilbao	Spain	For Spanish Navy.
Unknown date	Björn Järnsida	Turuma			Sweden	For Royal Swedish Navy.
Unknown date	Black Prince	Merchantman		Philadelphia, Pennsylvania	Thirteen Colonies	For private owner.
Unknown date	Britannia	Merchantman		Bombay Dockyard	India	For Waters & Co.
Unknown date	Diana	Schooner		Province of Massachusetts Bay	Thirteen Colonies	For private owner.
Unknown date	Diligence	Collier		Whitby	Great Britain	For private owner.
Unknown date	Fanny	West Indiaman		River Thames	Great Britain	For private owner.
Unknown date	Fethü'l Fettah	Third rate		Constantinople	Ottoman Empire	For Ottoman Navy.
Unknown date	Grand Duchess of Russia	Merchantman		Whitby	Great Britain	For private owner.
Unknown date	Held Woltemade	Merchantman		Amsterdam	Dutch Republic	For Dutch East India Company.
Unknown date	Le Superbe	Indien-class East Indiaman		Lorient	Kingdom of France	For Compagnie des Indes.
Unknown date	Loudon	Merchantman		Liverpool	Great Britain	For Austrian East India Company.
Unknown date	Nancy	Schooner		Bombay Dockyard	India	For British East India Company.
Unknown date	Prosperous	Brig	Nicholas Bools	Bridport	Great Britain	For John Brine.
Unknown date	Ragvald	Turuma			Sweden	For Royal Swedish Navy.
Unknown date	Rose	Cutter	Nicholas Bools	Bridport	Great Britain	For HM Customs.
Unknown date	Royal Charlotte	Full-rigged ship		Bombay Dockyard	India	For Greenway & Co.
Unknown date	Santa Margarita	Fifth rate			Spain	For Spanish Navy.
Unknown date	Storehouse	Longboat	Adam Hayes	Deptford Dockyard	Great Britain	For Royal Navy.
Unknown date	Union	Merchantman		Philadelphia, Pennsylvania	Thirteen Colonies	For private owner.
Unknown date	Vasaorden	Royal barge			Sweden	For Gustav III.
Unknown date	Name unknown	Merchantman			Kingdom of France	For private owner.
Unknown date	Name unknown	Merchantman			Thirteen Colonies	For private owner.
Unknown date	Name unknown	Merchantman			Thirteen Colonies	For private owner.
Unknown date	Name unknown	Paddle steamer	Comte d'Auxiron	Seine	Kingdom of France	For Comte d'Auxiron.
