= SS Britannia =

A number of steamships have been named SS Britannia:

- SS Britannia (1863), wrecked in 1873.
- SS Britannia (1882), built for the United Kingdom Steamship Company at Short Brothers of Sunderland, scuttled as a blockship at Scapa Flow in 1914.
- SS Britannia (1887), scrapped in 1909.
- SS Britannia (1889), sunk by SM UC-75 in 1917
- SS Britannia (1902), operating in Howe Sound, British Columbia, withdrawn from service in 1928.
- SS Britannia (Wood, Skinner, 1902) sunk by SM U-38 in 1916
- SS Britannia (1909), scrapped in 1949.
- SS Britannia (1925), sunk by the German auxiliary cruiser Thor in 1941.
- SS Britannia (1929), scrapped in 2008.

== See also ==
- Britannia (ship)
- RMS Britannia
- HMY Britannia
- HMS Britannia
- Britannia-class steamship
