= Castor & Pollux (1790 ship) =

262-ton ship launched at Teignmouth

History

Great Britain
- Name: Castor & Pollux
- Launched: 1790, Tignmouth (Teignmouth)
- Captured: circa 1801

General characteristics
- Tons burthen: 262, or 269, (bm)
- Complement: 1794:16; 1795:14
- Armament: 1794: 12 × 4-pounder guns + 4 swivel guns; 1795: 12 × 4-pounder guns + 4 swivel gun; 1800: 2 × 4-pounder guns + 8 × 18-pounder carronades

Castor & Pollux was launched at Teignmouth in 1790. Initially she traded with the Mediterranean, and on one voyage suffered a fire at sea. She then became a West Indiaman. In 1799 she commenced a voyage as a whaler. A Spanish privateer captured her in the Pacific circa 1801.

== Career ==
Castor & Pollux first appeared in the Lloyd's Register (LR) volume for 1791.

Year	Master	Owner	Trade	Source
1791	R.Codner	Captain	Exeter–Straits	LR

Lloyd's List reported in September 1792 that Castor & Polleux, Codner, master, had been returning from Manfredonia when she caught fire at sea. Her captain and crew ran her onshore at Alicant to extinguish the fire.

War with France broke out early in 1793. Captain William Codner acquired a letter of marque on 30 April 1794.

Year	Master	Owner	Trade	Source
1794	R.Codner; W.Codner	R.Codner	Exeter–Straits; London–San Domingo	LR
1795	W.Codner; G.Godwin	R.Codner; Lee & Co.	London–San Domingo	LR

Captain John Godwin acquired a letter of marque on 3 April 1795.

Year	Master	Owner	Trade	Source & notes
1796	G.Godwin	J.Lee & Co.	London–Barbados	LR
1798	G.Godwin	J.Lee & Co. Latham & Son	London–Barbados	LR
1799	Godwin; Anderson	Latham & Son; Lushington	London–South Seas	LR; repairs 1799

On 21 March 1799 Castor & Pollux, Anderson, master, was at Deal, waiting to sail for the South Seas. In February 1800 Castor & Pollux called in at Rio de Janeiro in want of refreshments and repairs.

== Fate ==
In May 1801 Lloyd's List reported that a Spanish ship of 24 guns had captured "Britannia, late Mortlock, of London", and Castor & Pollux, Anderson, master, in the Galapagos Islands. The Spaniards then took their prizes into Lima. Their captor was the privateer Atlante, under the command of Dominque de Orué.
