= List of ships named Britannic =

The following ships have the name Britannic:

- SS Britannic (1874), the first ocean liner for White Star Line with the name, scrapped in 1903
- SS Britannic (1888 England), launched in Sunderland and sank by SM UC-27 on 1 January 1917.
- SS Britannic (1888 Michigan), later renamed Sarnor, wooden freighter launched from West Bay City, sank off of Grosse Ile on 9 August 1895, recovered and returned to service, destroyed by fire in 1926.
- HMHS Britannic, the second ocean liner for White Star Line with the name, launched in 1914 and sunk by a mine in 1916
- MV Britannic, an ocean liner for White Star Line, launched in 1929 and scrapped in 1961

== See also ==
- Britannic (disambiguation)
- Britannia (ship)
