= French brig Amarante (1793) =

Amarante
History

France
- Name: Amarante
- Namesake: Amaranth
- Builder
- Laid down: May 1793
- Launched: 23 August 1793
- Captured: December 1796

Great Britain
- Name: HMS Amaranthe
- Acquired: December 1796 by capture
- Commissioned: August 1797
- Fate: Wrecked 25 October 1799

General characteristics
- Displacement: 288 tons (French)
- Tons burthen: 29030/94 (bm)
- Length: 86 ft 1 1/4 in (26.245 m) (overall); 68 ft 8 3/8 in (20.939 m) (keel)
- Beam: 28 ft 2 1/2 in (8.598 m)
- Depth of hold: 13 ft 2 3/4 in (4.032 m)
- Complement: French service:110; British service:94
- Armament: French service: 12 × 12-pounder guns; British service: 12 × 24-pounder carronades + 2 × 6-pounder chase guns

The French brig Amarante (equally Amaranthe), was launched in 1793 at Honfleur for the French Navy. The British Royal Navy captured her at the end of 1796 and took her into service as HMS Amaranthe. She captured one French vessel in a single-ship action before she was wrecked near Cape Canaveral, Florida, in 1799.

== French service and capture ==
Amarante was the name ship of a two-vessel class of 12-gun brigs built to a design by Pierre-Alexandre-Laurent Forfait. She was also the first vessel that Joseph-Augustin Normand built at Honfleur for the French Navy.

Between February 1794 and December, she was under the command of enseigne de vaisseau Jacques-Philippe Delamare and escorted convoys from to Le Havre to Brest. Between February 1795 and May, she escorted convoys between Saint-Malo and Dieppe, and performed fisheries protection duties for the Dieppoise fishermen. She then protected the herring fisheries in the Channel.

Delamare was suspended in 1798 as a terrorist by order of the representative of the people Boissier. He was reinstated some months later and sent to Brest. A decree of the Public Safety Committee, dated 22 September, confirmed him in command of Amarante.

On 1 March 1797 Amarante was at La Hogue roads undergoing repairs.

HMS Diamond captured Amarante off Alderney on 31 December 1796. The letter in the London Gazette describes her as a brig of twelve 6-pounder guns, and nine men. She was sailing from Le Havre to Brest. She had no casualties.

== British service ==
Amarante arrived at Portsmouth on 2 January 1797. In August 1797 the Royal Navy commissioned her as Amaranthe under Commander Francis Vesey, and she then underwent fitting until February 1798.

Vesey sailed her for Jamaica in July 1798. However, on 29 August, she and Endymion recaptured the British East India Company "extra ship" Britannia, Stewart, master. Britannia had been sailing from Bengal to London when the French privateer Huron captured her.

In November, Surprise and Amaranthe captured the French 4-gun privateer Petite Française.

On 13 April 1799 Amaranthe captured the French letter of marque schooner Vengeur after a long chase and sharp fight. Vengeur had only six 4-pounder guns, half Anmaranthe's armament, but resisted fiercely for an hour and eight minutes. French casualties were 14 killed and 5 wounded (one of whom died later and another of whom was expected to die), out of 36 crew and passengers on board; British casualties were one man killed and four wounded. Vengeur had been carrying a cargo of flour from Santiago de Cuba to Jérémie, Haiti. She had been a privateer on her previous cruise, and Vesey described her as a "very fine Copper-bottomed Schooner, capable of mounting Ten Carriage Guns, nearly new, and fails uncommonly fast".

Vesey received promotion to post captain on 16 September. Commander George Blake then replaced Vesey as captain of Amaranthe.

== Fate ==
On 25 October 1799 Amaranthe was cruising off the coast of Florida. That evening she went aground. Efforts to free her were unavailing and the officers and crew took to the boats and rafts, with the last men having to swim for shore. Twenty-two men drowned. Morning revealed that the survivors had landed some leagues north of Cape Canaveral. The survivors had to walk for 13 days along the shoreline until they reached the Spanish settlement at Fort Matanzas on 8 November, where they were declared prisoners of war. The next day the Spaniards delivered the British to St Augustine. From there they traveled to Charleston, and on to Jamaica. The court martial took place on Hannibal on 30 December 1799 at Port Royal Harbour, Jamaica. The court martial acquitted Blake, his officers and crew of the loss of Amaranthe. However, the board found Blake blameable for having sailed west after dark at too high a speed and for failing to take frequent soundings with the lead. The board also ordered seaman Daniel Day to spend a month in jail for having prevaricated in his evidence and having wasted its time.
