= Recovery (1819 ship) =

UK merchant ship 1819–1829

History

United Kingdom
- Name: Recovery
- Launched: 1819, Ayre
- Fate: Abandoned 28 August 1829

General characteristics
- Tons burthen: 208 (bm)

Recovery was launched at Ayre in 1819. She traded between Great Britain and North America and the Caribbean. She suffered three major maritime incidents, the first in 1822 and the second in 1826. Her crew abandoned her at sea in August 1829.

== Career ==
Recovery first appeared in Lloyd's Register (LR) in 1819.

Year	Master	Owner	Trade	Source
1819	J.Hamlin	J.Hamlin	Greenock–Halifax, Nova Scotia	LR

On 25 May 1822 Recovery, Hamlyn, master, was driven ashore 10 nautical miles (19 km) south west of Campbeltown. She was on a voyage from New Orleans, Louisiana to Greenock. Recovery was refloated on 30 May. The paddlesteamer Britannia towed her into Greenock. Recovery had lost her anchors and cables and had been obliged to throw some of her cargo, spars, and stores overboard. While Recovery had been on her journey the naval schooners USS Porpoise and Shark stopped her in the Gulf of Florida. The schooners were on anti-piracy patrol; they treated Recovery with "great politeness".

Year	Master	Owner	Trade	Source & notes
1823	J.Hamlin; T.Johnson	J.Hamlin	London–New Brunswick; London–Antigua	LR; damages repaired 1822
1825	T.Johnson	J.M'Gowan	Greenock–Honduras	LR; damages repaired 1822
1826	T.Johnson; Weatherhew; J.Wilson	J.M'Gowan	Greenock–Honduras	LR; damages repaired 1822

Recovery, Wilson, master, arrived at Greenock on 5 October 1826 from Jamaica. She had left Jamaica on 5 August. On 7 September she experienced a dreadful gale during which she lost the sternboat, part of the bulwarks, two water casks and sundry articles.

Year	Master	Owner	Trade	Source & notes
1827	Wilson; G.Patterson	A.Tennant	London–Bombay	LR; damages repaired 1822
1829	G.Patterson	A.Tennant	London–Bombay	LR; damages repaired 1822

== Loss ==
Although the 1829 volume Lloyd's Register showed a voyage to Bombay, that appears to have been an intention. There is no readily available evidence for such voyage.

On 28 August 1829 her crew abandoned Recovery, Patterson, master, in the Atlantic Ocean. A heavy sea had hit her on 24 August at 48°N 19°W, causing substantial damage and washing overboard one crew member and both her boats. She developed a leak that the pumps could not overcome, forcing her crew to abandon her. Lyra, May, master, rescued the 13 surviving crew members. Recovery was on a voyage from Trinidad to London. Lyra had been on her way to England from St Johns, New Brunswick and she brought the survivors into Plymouth. (Note: Lyra, of 222 tons (bm), C.May, master, had been launched at Prince Edward Island in 1826.)
