= Hermione-class frigate =

Hermione-class frigate may refer to:

- Hermione-class frigate (French Navy), a class of 2 French Navy ships launched in 1699
- Hermione-class frigate (Royal Navy), a class of 6 Royal Navy ships launched in the 1780s
