= Britannia (1788 Scotland ship) =

History

Great Britain
- Name: Britannia
- Builder: Scotland
- Launched: 1788
- Fate: Wrecked 8 February 1794

General characteristics
- Tons burthen: 206 (bm)

Britannia was launched in 1788 in Scotland and first appeared in Lloyd's Register (LR) in 1789 with D.Hunter, master, Hunter & Co., owners, and trade Greenock-Virginia. LR for 1794 showed her with D.Martin, master, Macneil & co., owners, and trade Greenock–New York. Britannia, of Glasgow, was under the command of Captain D. Martin when she wrecked on 8 February 1794 in the Wreck of the Ten Sail.

Captain Daniel Martin, of Britannia, was one of the eight people who drowned in the wrecking. The people on Grand Cayman were themselves suffering from the consequences of recent hurricanes and could offer little help to the survivors.
