= Britannia (1798 ship) =

History

Great Britain
- Name: Britannia
- Owner: W. Boyd
- Builder: Dutch
- Acquired: 1798 by purchase of a prize
- Home port: London
- Captured: 1801

General characteristics
- Tons burthen: 296, or 309 (bm)
- Propulsion: Sails
- Armament: 8 × 12-pounder carronades

Britannia was a merchant vessel captured from the Dutch. She made one complete whaling voyage to the South Seas. A Spanish vessel captured her at the Galapagos Islands in 1801 on her second whaling voyage.

== Career ==
Britannia was a Dutch prize, captured in 1797 that underwent repairs in 1798. She entered Lloyd's Register in 1798 with W. Shaw, master, W. Boyd, owner, and trade Portsmouth-Jamaica. In 1799 Mortlock replaced Shaw as master, and her trade was listed as Portsmouth-Cape of Good Hope.

Whaling voyage: Captain Mortlake left Britain on 13 March 1799. Britannia called in at Rio de Janeiro in July for sugarcane syrup. She returned to England on 30 May 1800.

Loss: In May 1801 Lloyd's List reported that a Spanish ship of 24 guns had captured "Britannia, late Mortlock, of London", and Castor & Pollux, Anderson, master, in the Galapagos Islands. The Spaniards then took their prizes into Lima. Their captor was the privateer Atlante, under the command of Dominque de Orué.
