= Britannia (1815 steamship) =

UK paddle steamer 1815–1829

History

United Kingdom
- Name: Britannia
- Port of registry: Glasgow, Scotland
- Builder: John Hunter, Port Glasgow
- Launched: February 1815
- Completed: 1815
- Fate: Wrecked on 12 October 1829

General characteristics
- Type: wood-hulled paddle steamer
- Tons burthen: 73 (bm; 1821)
- Length: 93 ft 4 in (28.45 m) (1821)
- Beam: 16 ft 5 in (5.00 m) (1821)
- Depth: 8 ft 3 in (2.51 m) (1821)
- Installed power: 24 hp (18 kW) nominal horse power
- Propulsion: 2-cylinder beam engine

Britannia of 1815 was a wood-hulled British paddle steamer built at Port Glasgow for services on the Firth of Clyde. Later she ran between Glasgow and Derry. Britannia was wrecked at Donaghadee on 12 October 1829.

== Construction ==
Britannia was launched in February 1815 at the Port Glasgow shipyard of John Hunter. With a wooden hull, her side-paddles were powered by a two-cylinder beam engine made by D McArthur and Company at Camlachie. Britannia's initial tonnage and dimensions are not known with certainty, but after she was altered and lengthened by John Wood and James Barlay at Port Glasgow in 1821, her tonnage was 73 by Builder's Old Measurement. By that time she was 93 ft 4 in (28.45 m) long, had a beam of 16 ft 5 in (5.00 m) and a depth of 8 ft 3 in (2.51 m) and reportedly had a new engine by James Cook of Glasgow.

== History ==
The paddle steamer was built for a partnership led by Lewis MacLellan of Glasgow and A McTaggart of Campbeltown and intended, together with the similar Waterloo, for services between those two ports. Initially though she ran from Glasgow to Tarbert and Inveraray, at the head of Loch Fyne, and only later in 1815 began serving Rothesay, Campbeltown and Helensburgh on a fortnightly basis. The following year the Britannia & Waterloo Steam Boat Company proposed what may be the first offering of season tickets to "families wishing to agree for the season" covering the two ships' services to a wide range of western Scotland destinations . In 1818 she additionally made some summer excursions round Ailsa Craig, off the Ayrshire coast.

Although as early as September 1816 there was reported intent of the Britannia making a voyage from Glasgow to Belfast, Eighteen-twenty brought the first recorded trip between the Clyde and the northern Ulster coast when she made an excursion voyage to the Giant's Causeway in County Antrim. The following year a similar cruise was successfully extended to Derry, lasting four days from Glasgow. In 1822, under the name Glasgow and Londonderry Steam Packet Company, she began a regular service between those ports, with additional calls at Culmore, Quigley's Point, Moville, Greencastle and Portrush, which continued for seven years. In May 1822 Britannia towed into Greenock the Recovery, which had grounded near Campbletown.

In 1826 the owning company was changed to Britannia Steam Boat Company in consequence of the sale of Waterloo.

== Loss ==
In October 1829 Britannia's owners announced a new service between Glasgow and Warrenpoint (for Newry) with the first return voyage scheduled to depart Warrenpoint on 10 October. En route to Glasgow with passengers and a cargo of wheat, she met a storm on Sunday 11 October on the Irish coast and put in to Donaghadee for shelter. In an abrupt change of wind direction early overnight, she ground on her anchors or a rock, took a leak and sank. All the passengers and crew were saved, as was half the cargo, but on 13 October further heavy storms reduced Britannia to a total wreck. (Note: Some written sources inexplicably give dates for her 1829 loss at Donaghadee somewhat later than contemporary reports: McNeill (21 November), Deayton (23 November).)
