= Royal Charlotte (1774 ship) =

History

Great Britain
- Name: Royal Charlotte
- Namesake: Charlotte of Mecklenburg-Strelitz
- Owner: 1774:Greenway and Co.; 1796:Higgins
- Builder: Bombay Dockyard
- Launched: 1774
- Fate: Destroyed by explosion 11 October 1797

General characteristics
- Tons burthen: 675, or 677 bm)
- Complement: 56
- Armament: 14 × 6-pounder guns

Royal Charlotte was launched by Bombay Dockyard in 1774 as a country ship (British ships sailing between India and China). She made one voyage for the British East India Company in 1796 when she sailed from Calcutta to Britain. There she took on British registry. She sailed back to Calcutta where a lightning bolt ignited her magazine, destroying her in 1797.

== Career ==
Royal Charlotte was among the country ships reported at Canton in 1789.

She made one trip for the EIC, under Captain William Greenway, who left Calcutta on 31 January 1796, reached Saint Helena on 8 May, and The Downs on 3 August. After she reached Britain she took on British registry on 4 October 1796.

Royal Charlotte first appeared in Lloyd's Register for 1797 with W. Smith, master, and Higgins, owner. Her trade was London—East Indies. Captain William Logie Smith received a letter of marque dated 30 November 1796 for the Royal Charlotte.

== Fate ==
On 11 October 1797, Royal Charlotte was anchored off Culpee, an anchorage towards Calcutta, and closer than Saugor. She was soon to sail for London when a storm came up. At about 2:24 a.m. a lightning bolt hit her foremast and travelled down to her magazine, where it ignited 500 barrels of gunpowder destined for the Cape of Good Hope. Britannia, which was anchored nearby and which had a like quantity of gunpowder and a similar storage arrangement, observed the disaster; the next day the crew landed their powder to enable the magazine to be more intelligently located.

Although Captain Smith and a few of his officers and crew were ashore, the explosion killed 20 European crewmen, 66 lascars, and some 50 women and children who were traveling as passengers. Lloyd's List reported on 24 April 1798 that "The Royal Charlotte, Extra Ship, from Bengal, is blown up with all the crew, at Calpee in Bengal River." The EIC valued her cargo at £3,695.

William Logie Smith was in the country service of the EIC when he died in Bengal in March 1803.
