= Union (1774 ship) =

History

Great Britain
- Name: Union
- Builder: Philadelphia
- Launched: 1774
- Captured: 1781

General characteristics
- Tons burthen: 305, or 350, or 351, or 359 (bm)
- Complement: 50 (1778)
- Armament: 1776:10 × 4-pounder + 8 × 3-pounder guns; 1778: 16 × 4-pounder + 8 swivel guns; 1781: 14 × 4-pounder guns

Union was launched in Philadelphia in 1774. She sailed between England, North America, and the West Indies. She made one voyage as a slave ship in the triangular trade in enslaved people. She then returned to her previous trade. A privateer captured her in 1781.

== Career ==
Union, William Hamilton, master, was registered at Philadelphia on 2 April 1774. Her burthen was given as 250 tons.

Voyage transporting enslaved people (1775–1776): Captain William Hamilton sailed from London on 8 September 1775, bound for West Africa. Union acquired captives first at the Sierra Leone estuary and then at the Îles de Los. Union departed Africa on 14 November, reached Grenada, and then sailed for Jamaica on 12 December. She arrived at Jamaica and then returned to London on 9 July 1776.

Union first appeared in Lloyd's Register (LR) in 1776.

Year	Master	Owner	Trade	Source
1776	W.Hambelton	Markham; Muir & Co.	London–Jamaica; London–Quebec	LR

On 12 June 1778, Captain William Hamilton acquired a letter of marque. On the letter Hamilton declared that Union was carrying provisions for His Majesty's forces. (Note: The British Admiralty had given notice in April 1777, that they were ready to issue letters of marque for privateers against the Americans. In March 1778, Great Britain broke off relations with France.)

Year	Master	Owner	Trade	Source
1779	Hambelton	Muir & Co.	London–Quebec	LR
1781	Hamilton	Mure & Co.	London–South Carolina	LR

== Loss ==
Lloyd's List reported on 3 August 1781 that Union, late Hamilton, had been taken and carried into Hispaniola. She had been sailing from Charles-town to Jamaica.
