= Vere (1781 ship) =

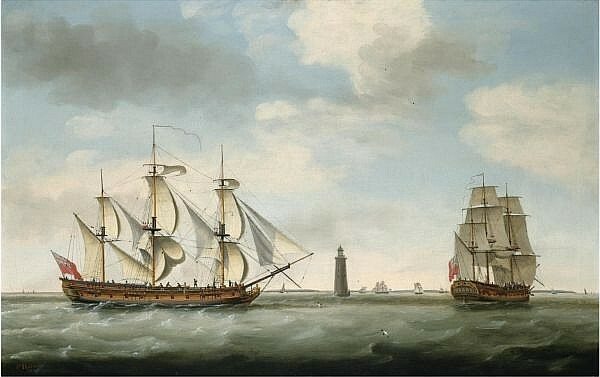
- Captain John Carr and his Ship Vere, in two positions off the Eddystone Lighthouse; Francis Holman, 1782

History

Great Britain
- Name: Vere
- Builder: Thames
- Launched: 1774
- Captured: December 1794
- Fate: Last listed in 1796

General characteristics
- Tons burthen: 380, or 400 (bm)
- Armament: 1781; Fanny:2 × 9-pounder + 16 × 6-pounder + 2 × 4-pounder guns; Vere:26 × 6-pounder guns

Vere was a British ship launched in 1774 as Fanny, and was renamed in 1781. She spent much of her career, under either name, as a West Indiaman. In 1794, she was on her way from Jamaica to London with French prisoners who captured her and took her into South Carolina. She was last listed in 1796.

== Career ==
Vere first entered Lloyd's Register (LR) in 1781, with the notation that she had been Fanny. The entry for that year for Fanny had the annotation "Now the Vere, Carr".

=== Fanny ===
Fanny first appeared in LR in 1776.

Year	Master	Owner	Trade	Source & notes
1776	D.Sinclair	Currie & Co.	London—Jamaica	LR
1781	D.Sinclair	Ewer & Co	Transport London	LR

=== Vere ===
Year	Master	Owner	Trade	Source & notes
1781	John Carr	Long & Co.	London–Jamaica	LR
1790	Jn Carr; R.Murray	Long&Co. Cox & Co.	London–Jamaica; London–Grenada	LR; damages repaired 1784 and thorough repair 1790
1796	R.Murray	Cox & Co.	London–Grenada	LR; damages repaired 1784 and thorough repair 1790

== Fate ==
Vere was last listed in 1796, though the last mention of Vere, Murray, master, in ship arrival and departure data occurred in 1793.

In December 1794, Vere was transporting French prisoners from Jamaica to England. After she had separated from her convoy, the prisoners were able to seize her. They then sailed her to Georgetown, South Carolina, and then Charleston. Judge Thomas Bee, of the United States District Court of South Carolina, ruled on 22 January 1795, that the Court did not have the power to order restitution, and that the French captors had the right to depart unmolested.
