= Britannia (1783 Maryport ship) =

History

Great Britain
- Name: Britannia
- Owner: Younghusband
- Builder: Maryport
- Launched: 1783
- Captured: Circa 1814

General characteristics
- Tons burthen: Originally: 207, After rebuilding: 260, or 265 (bm)
- Propulsion: Sails
- Sail plan: Brig
- Armament: 12 × 3&4-pounder guns
- Notes: Lengthened and rebuilt in 1792

Britannia, was a vessel launched at Maryport in 1783. She was commonly referred to as Britannia of Liverpool to distinguish her from the several other contemporary Britannias. Between 1793 and 1797 she made two whaling voyages. Thereafter she appears to have engaged in the coastal trade until 1813, when she made a voyage to the Americas. She was captured circa 1814.

Britannia was listed in Lloyd's Register in 1790 with Younghusband, owner, and Younghusband, master, changing to J. Fleming, master. Her trade was London-Nova Scotia.

Captain John Fleming sailed Britannia on two whaling voyages. On the first, she left Britain on 20 March 1793 and returned on 14 November. On the second voyage, she left on 3 January 1794 and returned on 28 November.

There is a record that she sailed on a third whaling voyage between 1796 and 23 June 1797 with Anderson, master. However, Britannia is not listed in Lloyd's Register in those years.

Britannia, of Maryport, built in 1783, appears in the Register of Shipping for 1800 with J. Moody as master and owner, and trade Newcastle—London.

After a thorough repair in 1812, in 1813 Britannia had a new owner, Hart & Co., a new master, Tullock, and a new trade: Southampton—America. She also was now armed. Her entry in the Register of Shipping for 1814 bears the annotation "CAPTURED".
