= Britannia (1794 ship) =

History

Great Britain
- Name: Britannia
- Owner: 1794:H. Jackson; 1799:Timperon
- Builder: Thomas Pitcher, Northfleet
- Launched: 27 August 1794
- Captured: 1798, and recaptured
- Fate: Lost c.1801

General characteristics
- Tons burthen: 384 (bm)
- Propulsion: Sails
- Sail plan: Brig
- Complement: 32
- Armament: 1795:10 × 4-pounder guns; 1796:12 × 6-pounder guns; 1800:10 × 6-pounder guns

Britannia was launched in 1794 at Northfleet. She made two voyages as an "extra ship" for the British East India Company (EIC). On her second voyage a French privateer captured her, but the British Royal Navy recaptured her shortly thereafter. She then became a West Indiaman and was lost c.1801.

== Career ==
=== 1st EIC voyage ===
Captain Thomas Nixon jnr. received a letter of marque for Britannia on 22 August 1795. He left Yarmouth on 20 September 1795, bound for Bengal. She arrived at Calcutta on 22 February 1796.

There she loaded rice on behalf of the British government which was importing grain to address high prices for wheat in Britain following a poor harvest.

Homeward bound, Britannia was at Culpee on 31 March, (Note: Culpee (or Coulpy or Kulpi) was an anchorage towards Calcutta, and just below Diamond Harbour.) and at Saugor on 19 April. She reached St Helena on 22 July, and arrived at The Downs on 15 September.

=== 2nd EIC voyage ===
Captain James Stewart received a letter of marque on 17 December 1796. He left Britain on 3 January 1797. The French privateer Huron (or Herion) captured Britannia on 22 August 1798 as she returned to Britain. (Note: The privateer may have been Huron, named for the Wyandot people, who were allies of the French against the British in North America. A possible candidate is Huron, of Bordeaux, probably commissioned in 1793, 300 tons (French; of load), 18 to 20 guns, with 9 officers and between 112 and 180 men. She was under Captain Pierre Destebetcho in 1793 (dates not clear), Captain Harismedy circa late 1797–1798, Destebetcho (first name not clear) from July 1798 to 1799, and Captain Saint Guiron from 1799 in Bordeaux to May 1800 in Mauritius. HMS Magicienne captured Huron circa January 1801 in the Channel as Huron was returning from Mauritius.) HMS Endymion and Amaranthe were in company when they recaptured her on 27 August at 46°20′N 12°55′W. They took her into Cork. She reached home on 8 October.

=== Subsequent career ===
In 1799 Timperon purchased Britannia. Captain J. Mann replaced Stewart and her trade became London-Grenada. She was last listed in Lloyd's Register in 1804, but the Register of Shipping for 1801 has the notation "LOST". Lloyd's List for 25 September 1801 reported that Britannia, from Jamaica to London, was lost at Old Harbour, Jamaica.
