= Britannia (smack) =

Fishing smack

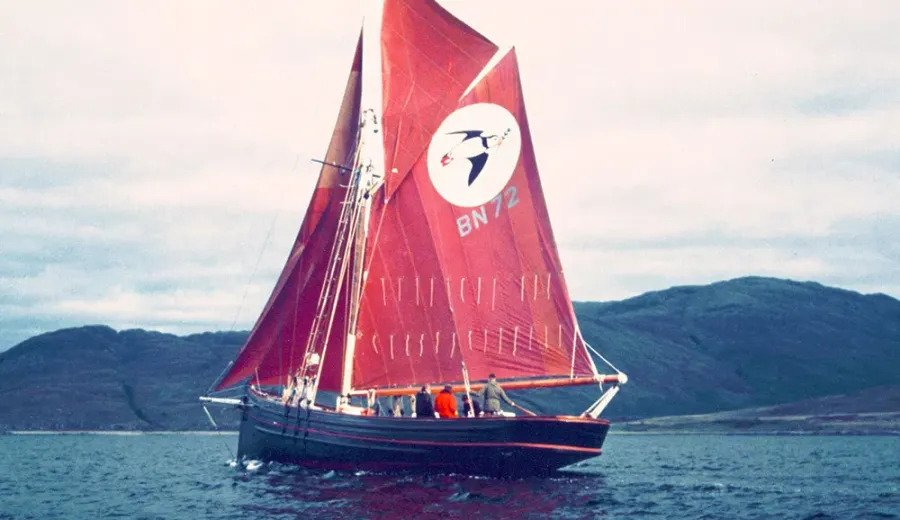
Britannia sailing off the Isle of Skye in the 1980s

Britannia (BN72) is the last working Class One East Coast Smack. She was built in King's Lynn in 1914 and launched in 1915. After (2021) undergoing restoration in Devon, the ship was relaunched in 2023. She measures 16.82 metres (55.2 ft) long with a beam of 4.05 metres (13.3 ft).

== History ==
Britannia was built as the result of consultations between her owner Alfred Rake and the builders the Worfolk Brothers of King's Lynn. She was built of single grown oak frames sourced from Sandringham Forest. She was the last and largest Class One Smack to be built by the Workfolk brothers. The National Historic Ships Register speculates that she was named after the King's yacht, the HMY Britannia, Rake having crewed on that yacht. Built in 1914, she was launched in 1915.

In the 1920s and 30s she was adapted for use as a power whelk trawler, and her interior later changed for use as a charter vessel. She capsized and sank in 1968, after which she was sold, and then restored in Bristol. From 1974 to 1997 she operated as a charter yacht on the west coast of Scotland, after which she was taken to the Hamble, where she continued to offer sailing holidays. In 1995 she was renamed Spirit of Britannia due to registry issues while chartering in the canaries. She was acquired by the Trinity Sailing Trust of Brixham in 2007, refitted in 2008, and in 2011 laid up due to the scarcity of charter work, during which time she was allowed to fall into substantial disrepair. Since 2013 she has been undergoing restoration by the Britannia Sailing Trust in Winkleigh, mid-Devon. She was scheduled to be relaunched in 2022, but the work was delayed. She was returned to the water on the 24th of September, 2023, with restoration work continuing. When restoration is complete she is to be based in Cornwall, offering sailing experiences to the disadvantaged and campaigning for cleaner seas.

== Legacy ==
In 1979 she featured in the HTV series Smuggler. A model of Britannia is held in King's Lynn Museum (with the ship number LN76 on her).
