= Britannia (1782 ship) =

History

Great Britain
- Name: Britannia
- Owner: Wardell or Weddell or Wardall
- Builder: Newfoundland
- Launched: 1782
- Captured: July 1793

General characteristics
- Tons burthen: 234 (bm)
- Propulsion: Sails
- Sail plan: Brig

Britannia was launched at Newfoundland in 1782. In July 1793 she was returning to England from a whaling voyage to the South Seas Fishery when a French privateer captured her in the Channel.

She left Britain on 11 November 1791 under the command of Simpson, master. Britannia was reported "all well" on the coast of Peru on 2 July, and on 30 November on the coast of Peru with 50 tons of sperm oil As Britannia was returning to Britain, a French privateer captured her and took her into France in July 1793.
