= Wreck of the Ten Sail =

1794 wreck of ten ship off Grand Cayman

Wreck of the Ten Sail is a historic shipwreck event that occurred off the East End of Grand Cayman on 8 February 1794. Ten ships that were part of a convoy on its way from Jamaica to the United States and Britain wrecked on the surrounding reef. While local residents braved the stormy waters and successfully rescued the ships' crews and passengers, eight people from the convoy died.

== History ==
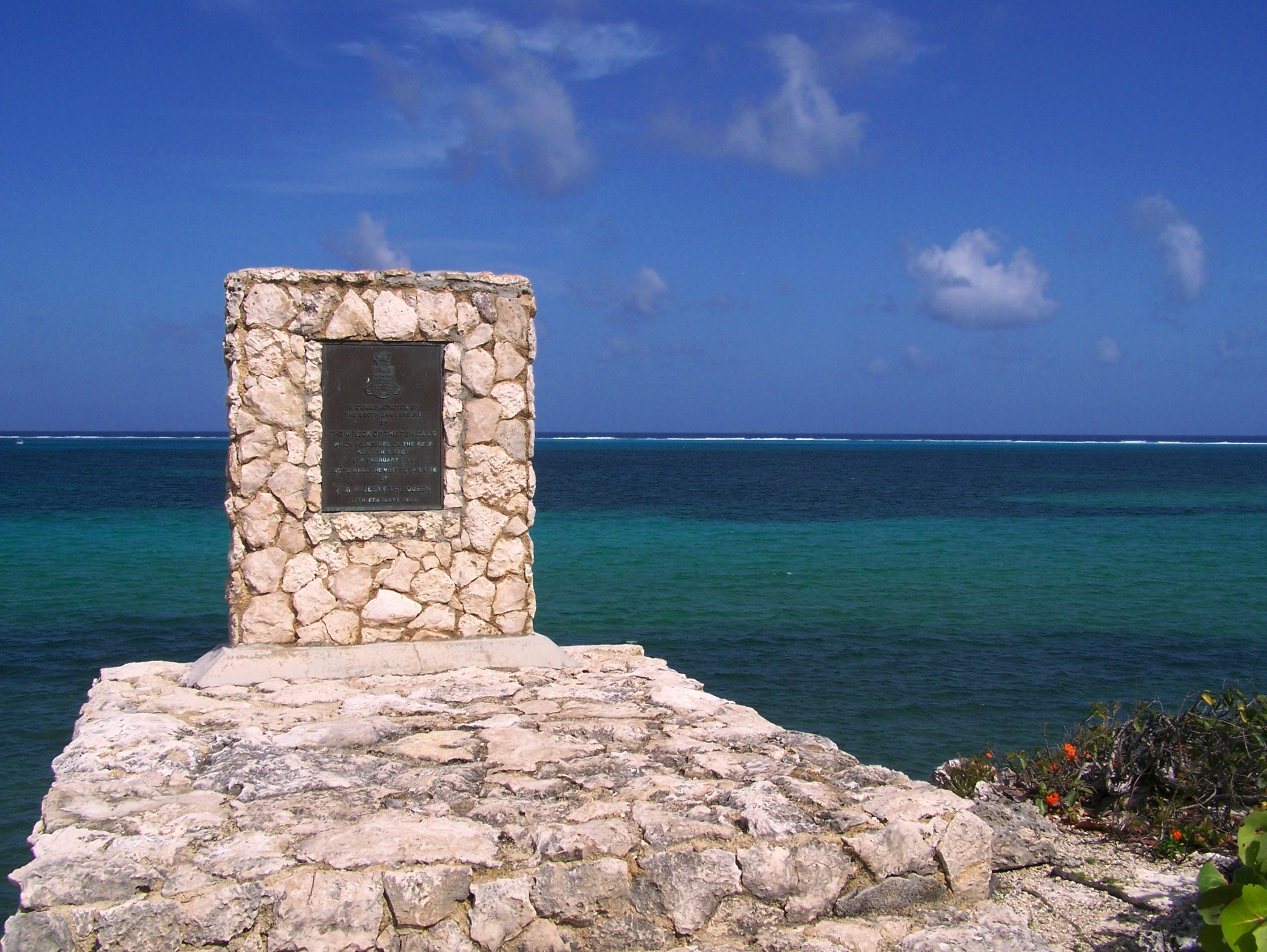
Wreck of the Ten Sail memorial plaque and viewpoint - dedicated by Her Majesty Queen Elizabeth II in 1994

In 1793, the Royal Navy captured the French frigate Inconstante off Saint Domingue and commissioned into the British navy as HMS Convert in November 1793. The newly commissioned frigate, captained by John Lawford, was ordered to escort a convoy of six merchantman from Jamaica to Britain. Three other merchantman bound for the United States joined the convoy. The nine merchantmen were: Britannia, Eagle, Fortune, Ludlow, Moorhall, Nancy, Richard, Sally, and William and Elizabeth.

After sailing for nearly 24 hours, Lawford believed they had already passed Grand Cayman. Before going to bed the evening of 7 February 1794, he gave permission for a change of course several points to the north, heading directly for the western end of Cuba and the Florida Channel. With most of the convoy to the south of the lead ship, six or seven merchantmen ships moved ahead of the leading ship and without attracting the attention of Convert's watch. At 3 a.m. on 8 February Lawford was called on deck following the discharge of a distress gun. With a Convert watchman yelling, "Breakers ahead. Close to us!", Lawford gave orders for the rest of the fleet to disperse, hoping to avoid disaster. A merchantman on the opposite tack, however, struck Convert twice and forced her into the windward reef, causing her to become severely damaged and eventually swamped.

One vessel, Diana, Thompson, master, saw the disaster but not having any boats, could not render any assistance and so sailed on to Britain, arriving at the Downs on 16 March. An initial report appeared in Lloyd's List on 21 March.

Caymanians living on the East End and in Bodden Town came to the aid of the 10 ships and rescued the crews and passengers. Despite their efforts, eight lives were lost as a result of the wreck. Amongst those lost was Captain Martin of Britannia, who went down with his ship.

After his rescue, Captain Lawford travelled to George Town, sending a number of distress messages, one of which was to the Governor of Havana, asking for assistance with the remains of the convoy; another was sent to his commander-in-chief, Commodore John Ford. Three days after the wreck, leaders among the inhabitants of Grand Cayman informed Lawford that they were unable to continue to house and feed the numerous merchantmen and sailors. Lawford shipped off as many of the shipwrecked convoy members as he could. Among those to first leave Grand Cayman following the shipwreck were Lady Emilia Cooke and the naval and military officers who were travelling home. Within three weeks, a number of sloops and schooners arrived from Jamaica with provisions and assistance. Lawford and what was left of his crew proceeded to camp on the beach at Gun Bay. During this time, Lawford's crew attempted to rescue the guns from the submerged ships. While none of the guns were salvaged, the mail carried on Convert was saved, along with a large proportion of the cargo from all the wrecked ships. Among the cargo salvaged from the merchant ships were loads of rum, cotton, and wood.

After Commodore Ford received Lawford's distress call, a rescue was sent to the shipwrecked remaining on the island. HMS Success arrived at Grand Cayman in mid-March 1794, anchored only for a short time before taking Lawford and his crew back to Port Royal where he was court martialled aboard the same ship. Lawford was acquitted of all charges and went on to serve with distinction until his retirement in 1811.

== Legend ==
Residents of the Cayman Islands enjoy a tax-free existence; local legend has it that the reason for the absence of taxation is related directly to the Wreck of the Ten Sail. According to the legend, a member of the passenger list for the 10 vessels included a royal prince, one of the sons of Britain's King George III. The legend further states that when the King was apprised of the bravery on the part of the Caymanians in saving the crews and passengers of the foundering ships, he decided to repay their bravery. The reward became a decree that the people of the Cayman Islands would thereafter be free from war conscription and taxes. There is, however, no documented evidence that the decree was ever issued or that there was a member of the Royal Family on board one of the ships. Regardless, the legend continues today and is often repeated to travellers and tourists as well as amongst the residents of the Cayman Islands.

== Memorial ==
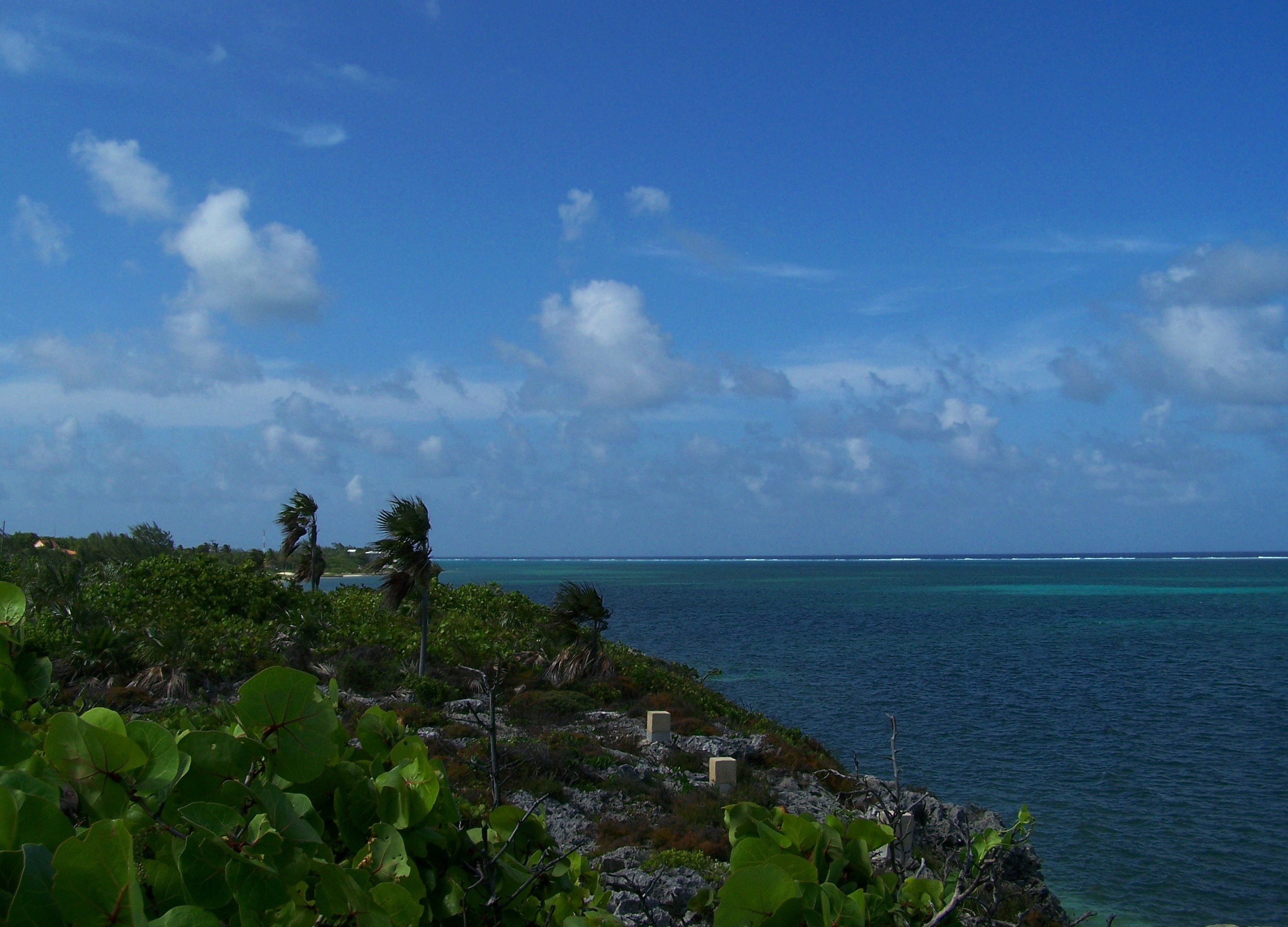
Two of the ten memorial stones embedded into ironshore cliff overlooking the Ten Sail wreck site

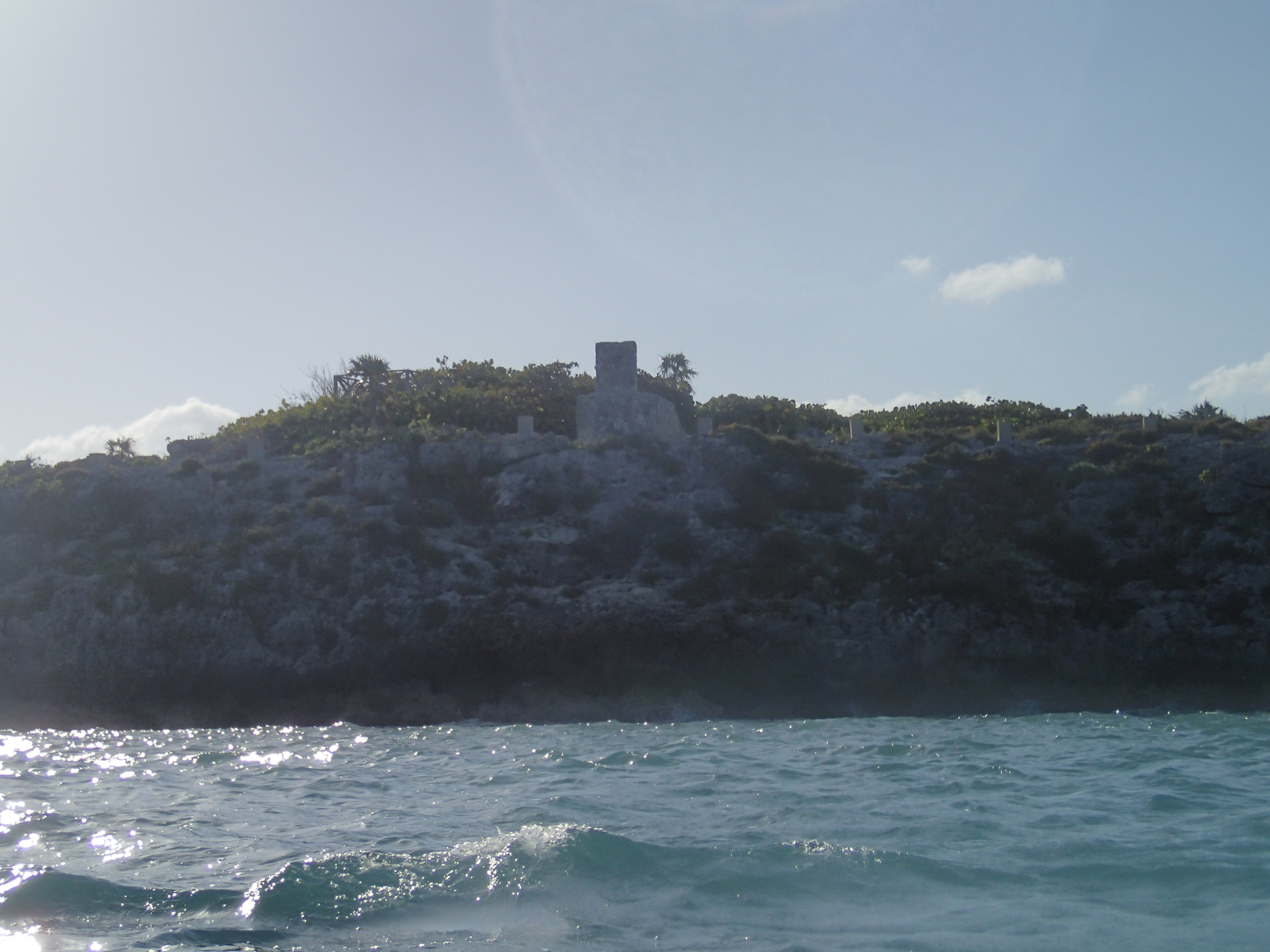
A picture of the Wreck of the Ten Sails memorial taken from the water.

Today, a park exists as a remembrance of the night of the shipwreck and the heroism of the residents who came to rescue those on-board all the ships. Beginning with the Maritime Trail that leads visitors to a view of the reef where the ships were wrecked and a cliff full of treacherous ironshore as well as brass and stone memorial to those who perished. Queen Elizabeth II and her husband, Prince Philip, visited the spot and dedicated the memorial plaque and park in 1994 - the 200th anniversary of the event. Below and beside the plaque and viewing platform on a cliff made of ironshore are ten embedded cement blocks.
