= HSwMS Dygden =

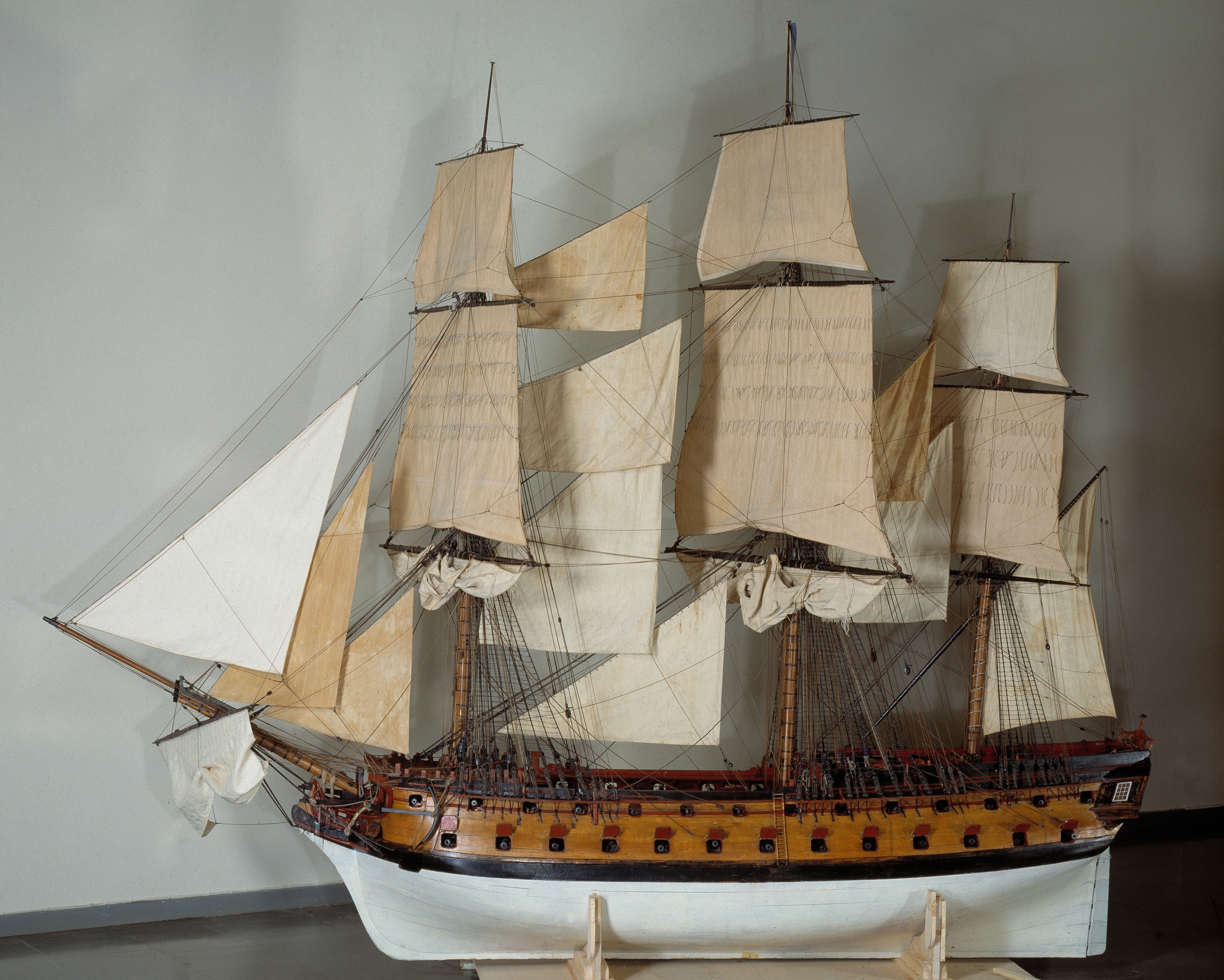
- Contemporary construction model of a ship in the Kronprins Gustaf Adolf class, on display at the Swedish National Maritime Museum in Stockholm.

History

Sweden
- Name: Dygden
- Builder: Karlskrona Naval Shipyard
- Launched: 6 July 1784
- Fate: Destroyed by explosion and fire on 29 June 1793
- Notes: Designed under the supervision of Fredrik Henrik af Chapman

General characteristics
- Type: Ship of the line
- Length: 49.5 m (162 ft 5 in)
- Beam: 13.59 m (44 ft 7 in)
- Draft: 5.79 m (19 ft 0 in)
- Complement: 567
- Armament: 64 guns

HSwMS Dygden was a Swedish ship of the line, launched on 6 July 1784 at the Karlskrona Naval Shipyard under the direction of Fredrik Henrik af Chapman. She took part in the naval campaigns of 1788–1790 during the war against Russia and was lost in an explosion and fire near the Kurrholmens kastell off Karlskrona on 29 June 1793.

== Sinking ==
The disaster occurred due to an explosion in the gunpowder magazine, which set the ship ablaze. The crew consisted of 567 men. After the sinking, the ship’s figurehead—a curly-haired, lightly dressed divine figure carved by the sculptor Johan Törnström—was salvaged and later placed on the captured Russian ship Vladislaff. The figurehead is currently preserved at the Swedish National Maritime Museum in Stockholm.

== Wreck ==
The shipwreck of Dygden was located in 2010 by Hans Lineskär, curator at the Marinmuseum in Karlskrona. Divers and marine archaeologists from the Swedish National Maritime Museums, along with Marinmuseum’s then-director Richard Bauer, carried out further investigations.

According to Gunnar Unger’s 1923 publication, the ship was armed with 62 guns, while the 2010 Marinmuseum press release states the armament was 64 guns.
