= Britannia (1774 ship) =

History

Great Britain
- Name: Britannia
- Owner: Originally: Waters & Co.; 1800: Lambert; 1801: Cleland & Co.
- Builder: Bombay Dockyard
- Launched: 1774
- Fate: Last listed 1809 in Register of Shipping and 1810 in Lloyd's Register

General characteristics
- Tons burthen: 305, 500, or 500 74/94, (bm)
- Length: 97 ft 10 in (29.8 m) (overall); 77 ft 3 in (23.5 m) (keel)
- Beam: 27 ft 3 in (8.3 m)
- Depth of hold: 12 ft 0 in (3.7 m)
- Complement: 60-80
- Armament: 1799: 12 × 9-pounder guns; 1810: 10 × 6-pounder guns
- Notes: Two-decked, teak-built merchantman; During the period 1790–1800, or so, six vessels named Britannia engaged in whaling in the South Seas, with several visiting Australia, either with convicts, or without. Separating them out is a non-trivial task as records appear to conflate them.

Britannia was launched in 1774, at Bombay. She was the focus of a protest against the Tea Act in Charleston, South Carolina in 1774. In 1796, she transported convicts from Ireland to Australia. This voyage was noteworthy for her captain's cruelty, for which he was tried but not sanctioned. She then sailed to China to pick up a cargo for the East India Company. On the way she visited or saw four islands in the present-day Marshall Islands. She remained employed in the services of the East India Company (EIC) until 1799. She then traded with India for a number of years, twice taking cargoes back to England for the EIC. Between 1808 and 1809, she was a whaler in the South Seas Fishery.

== Voyages ==
In November 1774, Britannia sailed from London to Charleston, South Carolina. In addition to passengers, she was carrying "seven chests of East Indian tea." The Captain, Samuel Ball, Jr., said that the tea had been ordered "without his knowledge or consent." Because of local objections to the British duty on tea, "on Thursday at Noon [November 3, 1774], an Oblation was made to Neptune." This incident has been called "The Charleston Tea Party" because the tea was dumped over the side, in the same fashion as had occurred at the Boston Tea Party a year earlier.

Captain Thomas Dennett (or Dennott) sailed Britannia from Calcutta on 28 November 1785, and Diamond Harbour on 4 January 1786. She reached the Cape on 2 March, and St Helena on 23 March. She arrived at Plymouth on 15 May, and Deptford on 8 June.

Britannia was admitted to Registry in Great Britain on 20 June 1796.

=== Convict ship ===
On 5 August 1796, Thomas Demmett [sic] received a letter of marque, which authorized him to capture French ships should the opportunity arise. Under the command of Thomas Dennett, Britannia departed Cork, Ireland on 10 December, and arrived in Sydney Cove on 27 May 1797. She embarked 144 male and 44 female prisoners; ten male convicts and one female convict died during the course of the voyage. An enquiry into the conduct of Captain Dennott (Demmett) was held in Sydney and is recorded in the Historical Records of Australia. The enquiry recommendations as to Demmett's "callous and brutal" treatment of the convicts was sent to England but the only repercussion was that Demmett never served on a convict ship again.

=== Exploration ===
Britannia left Sydney on 2 August 1797, for China, where she would pick up a cargo of tea. She initially followed the route that Scarborough followed. Britannia sailed north and into the region of the Marshall Islands. On 19 September, she sighted an island that Dennott named "Hunter Island" (Kili Island). Canoes brought out some islanders who wanted to trade breadfruit. The next day she sighted an island in the Ailinglaplap Atoll that Dennott named "Lamber Island". Natives again came out to trade but Britannia sailed on. Later that day Britannia did stop at an island in Namu Atoll that Dennott named "Ross Island". This time Britannia stopped and traded with the natives who came out. One native tore off a galley rail and took it away as a prize. On 21 September, Britannia sighted "Princess Island" at 8°21′N 167°25′E; this would appear to be Lib Island.

Dennett arrived at Macao on 16 October 1797, and was at Whampoa on 2 December. For her return to Britain, Britannia was at Macao on 28 March 1798, False Bay on 25 July, the Cape on 8 September, and St Helena on 17 November. Britannia reached the Downs on 4 February 1799. She reached London on 7 February.

Dennott left Britannia and apparently died around 1800. Lloyd's Register for 1800 records her owner as Lambert, and her master as "Palmer".

== London-India trade ==
Captain Edward Hanoner Palmer received a letter of marque of Britannia on 1 May 1799. On 28 May, Britannia sailed from London for Madras. On 24 September, she left the Cape in company with the American armed ship Atlantic. The two planned on sailing together as far as "Achun Head" (Aceh). On 8 October, a ship came into sight and appeared to be chasing them, but they separated and both escaped. Palmer and Britannia left Madras on 16 April 1800, reached St Helena on 8 July, and arrived at The Downs on 23 September. Britannia arrived back in London on 30 September.

Lloyd's Register for 1801, repeats the names of owner and master from the prior volume, but indicates a change with the name of Britannia's new owner as "Cleland Co." and the name of her master as "J. Johnson". It also indicates that she carried two 9-pounder guns and ten short 9-pounders "on the New Construction".

Britannia sailed from London on 21 January 1801, for Madeira and India. In Portsmouth her captain was relieved by Captain Stout. Benjamin Stout had received a letter of marque for Britannia two days earlier. Stout left Calcutta 28 October 1801. Homeward bound, Britannia was at Kedgeree on 4 January 1802, the Cape of Good Hope on 7 February, and St Helena on 26 March, arriving at The Downs on 29 May. She returned to London on 31 May2.

In 1802, Captain J. Reddy replaced Stout, though her master had still been listed as J. Johnson. Captain James Reddy, of Britannia was reported to have died in Bengal on 29 August 1803.

== Fate ==
Contradictorily, another report has Britannia still under Reddy's command between 1808 and 1810, with Cleland & Co. employing her on the South Sea whale fishery. Supporting evidence is thin.

A database of whaling voyages does not include Britannia. Lloyd's Register and the Register of Shipping for 1809 both still shows her trading on the India-London route, with Reddy as master. The 1810, Lloyd's Register shows Britannia, J. Reddy, master, and Cleland & Co., owners. Her trade is now London-South Seas. Britannia is no longer listed in the Register of Shipping after 1809, or in Lloyd's Register after 1810.

== Cultural depictions ==
Britannia's voyage as convict ship to New South Wales is depicted in the second episode of the Australian miniseries Against the Wind.
