= Britannia (1791 ship) =

History

Great Britain
- Name: Britannia
- Builder: Plymouth
- Launched: 1791
- Captured: October 1793
- Fate: Burnt October 1793

General characteristics
- Tons burthen: 91 (bm)

Britannia was launched at Plymouth in 1791. She first appeared in Lloyd's Register in 1792 with J.Bignal, master, Moore & co., owners, and trade London–Plymouth. A French privateer captured Britannia, Bignel, master, and burnt her in October 1793 as Britannia was sailing from London to Mogadore via Gibraltar.
