= HMS Britannia =

Six ships and a shore establishment of the Royal Navy have borne the name HMS Britannia, after Britannia, the goddess and personification of Great Britain:

- HMS Britannia (1682) was a 100-gun first rate ship of the line launched in 1682, rebuilt in 1719 and broken up in 1749.
- HMS Britannia (1762) was a 100-gun first rate launched in 1762. She was renamed HMS Princess Royal in 1812, HMS St George later in 1812, and HMS Barfleur in 1819. She was broken up in 1825.
- HMS Britannia (1820) was a 120-gun first rate ship of the line launched in 1820. She was a training ship after 1859, and broken up in 1869.
- HMS Prince of Wales (1860), a 120-gun first rate ship of the line renamed Britannia in 1869, as she replaced the previous vessel in the cadet training role. She was broken up in 1916.
- HMS Britannia (1904) was a King Edward VII-class pre-dreadnought battleship launched in 1904 and sunk by SM UB-50 in 1918.
- HMS Britannia Royal Naval College was the name given to the Naval Shore Establishment formed from the earlier Britannias. It retained the name until 1953, when it became known as HMS Dartmouth.

== See also ==
- HMY Britannia was a Royal Yacht launched in 1953. She was paid off in 1997 and has been on exhibition since 1998.
