= Britannia (1783 Saltcoats ship) =

Slave ship (1783–1799)

History

Great Britain
- Name: Britannia
- Owner: Salisbury; Robert Bent
- Builder: Saltcoats (Note: Lloyd's Register gives the place of building as "Sltc'ts".)
- Launched: 1783
- Fate: Captured 1799

General characteristics
- Tons burthen: 205, or 209, or 212 (bm)
- Propulsion: Sails
- Sail plan: Brig
- Complement: 1793:45; 1795:25
- Armament: 1793:6 × 6&9-pounder guns; 1795:10 guns, or 12 × 4-pounder guns

Britannia, was a vessel launched in 1783 at Saltcoats, possibly under another name. She made four voyages from Liverpool as a slave ship in the triangular trade in enslaved people. She grounded at Liverpool in 1793 after the first. A French privateer captured her in 1795 during the second, and took her to Guadeloupe where the Republican Government almost certainly freed the captives. She returned to British ownership and made two more voyages as a slave ship. A French privateer captured her during her fourth voyage.

== First voyage transporting enslaved people (1793–1794) ==
Britannia first appeared in Lloyd's Register (LR) in 1793, with J. James, master, Gregson, owner, and her trade as Liverpool-Africa. She had undergone a thorough repair in 1792.

A database of slave voyages from Liverpool shows that Britannia, Joseph James, master, and John Gregson, owner, had sailed for West Central Africa and St. Helena on 17 January 1793. James received a letter of marque dated 25 April 1793, i.e., in absentia, war with France having broken out after Britannia had sailed. In 1793, 68 vessels sailed from British ports, bound for voyages transporting enslaved people.

Britannia then delivered her captives to Grenada, arriving on 5 September with 331. Joseph James died on 7 November 1793.

Britannia arrived at Liverpool on 19 December. As she returned from Grenada to Liverpool, the pilot ran her ashore. Her cargo was saved, but at the time there was doubt as to whether it would be possible to save her too. Sh had left Liverpool with a crew of 28 men. Thirteen crew members had died on the voyage.

== Second voyage transporting enslaved people (1795-capture) ==
Lloyd's Register for 1795 showed Britannia as having undergone a repair in 1794. It gave her master as Wilson, changing to Curry, owner Salisbury changing to R. Bent, and her trade as Lancaster-Martinique, changing to Liverpool-Africa. On 13 October 1795, Gilbert Curry received a letter of marque.

Curry sailed Britannia from Liverpool 17 October 1795. In 1795, 79 vessels sailed from British ports to transport enslaved people from Africa to the West Indies; 59 of these vessels came from Liverpool. Extant records do not make clear when and where Curry acquired captives. Later, in 1796, Britannia was sailing from Africa to the West Indies when the French captured her and took her into Guadeloupe. (Note: Lloyd's List also reported that the french had captured Friends Goodwill, Pigot, master, which had been on her way from Barbados to Liverpool. The French sent her into Guadeloupe as well.) At the time, Guadeloupe was in the hands of anti-slavery republicans under the leadership of Victor Hugues. (Note: Hugues was governor from 1794 to 1798. He abolished chattel slavery, but maintained a system of unpaid obligatory work.) Britannia arrived in Guadeloupe with 328 captives. (Note: Gilbert Curry next commanded Achilles, of 117 tons (bm), launched in France in 1787, and taken in prize. The French privateer Driade, of Bordeaux, captured Achilles on 9 June 1797 as Achilles was on her way to Africa from Liverpool. Driade had already captured eight British vessels.)

In 1796, 22 British slave ships were lost whilst engaging in the slave trade. Twelve of the vessels, including Britannia, were lost on the Middle Passage, while sailing from Africa to the West Indies. War, not maritime hazards or slave resistance, was the greatest cause of vessel losses among British slave vessels between 1793 and 1807.

Britannia, of 212 tons (bm), launched at Saltcoats in 1783, returned to Lloyd's Register in 1798 with Hymers, master, Hodgson, owner, and trade Liverpool–Africa. She had undergone repairs in 1798.

== Third voyage transporting enslaved people (1798-1799) ==
Britannia, Joseph Carshore, master, sailed from Liverpool on 31 May 1798. In 1798, 160 vessels sailed from British ports, bound for slave trading voyages; 149 of these vessels sailed from Liverpool.

Carshore acquired captives at Bonny, and arrived at St John, Antigua on 29 November 1798 with 337 captives. Britannia left Antigua on 1 February 1799 and arrived back at Liverpool on 28 March. She had left Liverpool with 35 crew members and had suffered four crew deaths on her voyage.

== Fourth voyage transporting enslaved people (1799) ==
In 1799, 156 vessels sailed from British ports, bound for slave trading voyages; 134 of these vessels sailed from Liverpool. Captain James Owens and 41 crew members sailed from Liverpool on 16 June 1799.

In late 1799, three French frigates captured several slave ships, Britannia among them, off the Windward Coast. The French put the crews of the vessels they had captured on Diana, one of the captured ships. Diana, Sillars, master, arrived back at Liverpool on 18 January 1800.

Other sources report that Britannia had cleared Liverpool on 28 May 1799. Her loss was reported on 18 October 1799. In 1799, 18 slave ships were lost; of these losses, five occurred on the coast of Africa. Again, war, not maritime hazards or slave resistance, was the greatest cause of vessel losses among British slave vessels between 1793 and 1807.
