= Britannia (1787 ship) =

History

France
- Launched: 1774
- Captured: c.1781

Great Britain
- Name: Sally
- Acquired: 1782 by purchase of a prize
- Renamed: Britannia (1787)
- Fate: Wrecked 1793

General characteristics
- Tons burthen: 177, or 200 (bm)
- Armament: 4 × 3-pounder guns + 2 × 9-pounder carronades

Britannia was built in France in 1774. The British captured her in 1781 and she began sailing under the name Sally, first as a transport and then as a West Indiaman. Liverpool merchants purchased her and she became Britannia in 1787. She then sailed to the Baltic and Russia. She was wrecked in 1793.

== Career ==
Sally first appeared Lloyd's Register (LR) in 1782 with J.Croskill, master, A.Brough, owner, and trade London transport. She had undergone thorough repairs in 1782.

Year	Master	Owner	Trade	Source & notes
1783	J.Croskill	Brough	London transport	LR; thorough repairs 1782

On 24 October 1785 Sally ran on shore at New Providence.

Year	Master	Owner	Trade	Source & notes
1786	Croskill; A.Ogilvie	Captain; William Begbie	London–New Providence	LR; thorough repairs 1782 & 1784
1787	A.Ogilvie	W.Begbie	New Providence–London	LR; thorough repairs 1782 & 1784; "Now the Britannia"

Sally appeared under the name Britannia in 1787, after Liverpool merchants purchased her.

Year	Master	Owner	Trade	Source & notes
1787	Morrison	Captain	London–Memel	LR; thorough repairs 1782 & 1784, & repairs 1787
1790	Morrison; A.Combe	Captain	Memel–Leith	LR; thorough repairs 1782 & 1784, & repairs 1787
1793	A.Comb	A.Comb	Memel–Leith	LR; thorough repairs 1782 & 1784, & repairs 1787

== Fate ==
Britannia was lost in October 1793 whilst on a voyage from Arkhangelsk, Russia to a British port.
