= Bretton =

Bretton may refer to:

== Places in the UK ==
- Bretton, Derbyshire, England, a hamlet
- Bretton, Peterborough, Cambridgeshire, England, a settlement and civil parish
- Bretton, Flintshire, Wales, a village

== Other uses ==
- Bretton (name), a list of people with the name
- Bretton (EP), a 2008 record by Lower Than Atlantis
- Bretton's, a former Canadian high-end department store

== See also ==
- Bretton Hall (disambiguation)
- Bretton Woods (disambiguation)
- West Bretton, West Yorkshire
- Bretten (disambiguation)
- Brenton (disambiguation)
- Breton (disambiguation)
