= Breton (surname) =

Breton or Bretón is a surname. Notable people with the surname include:

- Adela Breton (1849–1923), English archaeologist
- Alex Breton (born 1997), Canadian ice hockey player
- André Breton (1896–1966), French author and surrealist theorist
- André Breton (1934–1992), Canadian singer
- Aurora Bretón (1950–2014), Mexican archer
- Didier Breton, business executive
- Pierre-Napoléon Breton (1858–1917), early Canadian numismatist
- Joel Breton (born 1971), game producer, entrepreneur and disc jockey
- Jules Adolphe Aime Louis Breton (1827–1906), French realist painter
- Julio Carrasco Bretón (born 1950), Mexican artist
- Malan Breton (born 1973), American fashion designer
- Manuel Bretón de los Herreros (1796–1873), Spanish dramatist
- Marisol Bretón (born 1975), Mexican archer
- Micky Bretón (1960–2009), Dominican television writer, director, and producer
- Nicholas Breton, 16th-century poet
- Nora Bretón, Mexican physicist
- Ruth Breton, American violinist
- Thierry Breton (born 1955), European Commissioner for the Internal Market
- Tomás Bretón (1850–1923), Spanish musician and composer
