= Briton (disambiguation) =

A Briton is a national or native of Great Britain.

Briton or Britons may also refer to:

== Individuals ==
- William Briton or Breton (died 1356), Breton Franciscan theologian
- Briton Hadden (1898–1929), co-founder and first editor of Time magazine
- Briton Hammon, 18th century slave in British North America who wrote an autobiography published in 1760
- Briton Rivière (1840–1920), British painter

== Other uses ==
- Celtic Britons or Ancient Britons, Celtic people who inhabited Great Britain from the British Iron Age into the Middle Ages
- HMS Briton, various Royal Navy ships
- PS Briton, a paddle steamer launched in 1862
- Briton Motor Company, a car manufacturer (1909–1919 and 1922–1929) based in Wolverhampton, England
- The Britons, an English antisemitic organization
- Britons, nickname of the Albion College sports teams
- Kaptain Briton, a Marvel Comics alternate version of Captain Britain

== See also ==
- Breton (disambiguation)
- Brit (disambiguation)
- British (disambiguation)
- Britain (disambiguation)
