= Kingdom of Britain =

The Kingdom of Britain may refer to:

- Kingdom of Great Britain (1707–1800)
- United Kingdom of Great Britain and Ireland (1801–1922)
- United Kingdom of Great Britain and Northern Ireland (1922–present)

== See also ==
- Kingdom of Brittany
- King of the Britons
- List of legendary kings of Britain
- Terminology of the British Isles
- Monarchy of the United Kingdom
- Great Britain (disambiguation)
- Britain (disambiguation)
