= Britain =

Britain most often refers to:

- Great Britain, an island in the North Atlantic Ocean
- The United Kingdom of Great Britain and Northern Ireland, a country in Northwestern Europe

Britain may also refer to:

== Places ==
- British Isles, an archipelago comprising Great Britain, Ireland and many other smaller islands
- British Islands, the United Kingdom, the Channel Islands and the Isle of Man collectively
- Roman Britain, a Roman province corresponding roughly to modern-day England and Wales
- Historical predecessors to the present-day United Kingdom:
  - Kingdom of Great Britain (1707 to 1800)
  - United Kingdom of Great Britain and Ireland (1801 to 1922)
- Britain (place name)
- Britain, Virginia, an unincorporated community in the US

== People ==
=== Given name ===
- Britain Covey (born 1997), American professional football player
- Britain Dalton (born 2001), American actor
- Britain Hart (born 1990), American professional boxer

=== Surname ===
- Calvin Britain (1800–1862), an American politician
- Clarissa Britain (1816–1895), an American inventor
- Kristen Britain (born 1965), an American novelist

== Other uses ==
- Captain Britain, a Marvel Comics superhero

== See also ==
- Terminology of the British Isles
- Britains
- Britannia
- Brittain (disambiguation)
- Brittany (disambiguation)
- Brit (disambiguation)
- Britten (disambiguation)
- Briton (disambiguation)
- Brittonic languages
- British (disambiguation)
- Great Britain (disambiguation)
- Little Britain (disambiguation)
- New Britain (disambiguation)
- National sports teams of the United Kingdom
