= William Breton =

William Breton may refer to:

- William Briton (died 1356), a.k.a. William Breton
- William the Breton (c. 1165–c. 1225), French chronicler and poet
- Sir William Breton (MP), Keeper of the Privy Purse (1763–1773) for George II

== See also ==
- William Bretton (1909–1971), Dean of Nelson
- William Britain (disambiguation)
- William Britton (disambiguation)
