= Breton =

Breton most often refers to:

- anything associated with Brittany, and generally
  - Breton people
  - Breton language, a Southwestern Brittonic Celtic language of the Indo-European language family, spoken in Brittany
  - Breton (horse), a breed
  - Galette or Breton galette or crêpe, a thin buckwheat flour pancake popular in Brittany
  - Breton (hat) headgear with upturned brim, said to be based on designs once worn by Breton agricultural workers
  - Breton shirt, commonly known as a marinière

Breton may also refer to:

- Breton (surname)
- Breton (band), a South London-based music group
- Breton (Elder Scrolls), a race in The Elder Scrolls game series who are descendants of men and Elves
- Breton, an alternative name for these wine grapes:
  - Cabernet Franc
  - Béquignol noir
- Breton (company)
- Breton, Alberta, village in Alberta, Canada
- Cape Breton An island occupying roughly the northern fifth of Nova Scotia, Canada

== See also ==
- Bretonne, 2010 album by Nolwenn Leroy
- Briton (disambiguation)
- Brereton (disambiguation)
- Bretton (disambiguation)
