= Isannah =

Isannah is a feminine given name that has been in occasional use in the Anglosphere since the 1700s. It has many spelling variants, including Isana, Isanah, Isanna, Izanna,and Izannah. The name has been described as an American combination of the names Isabel and Susannah. Others have speculated that it might have been used in Colonial America as a feminine version of the Biblical name Isaac, combined with the feminine ending -anna used in names such as Hannah and Susannah.

== Females ==
- Isannah Greeley (1775–1800), daughter of American sea captain Jonathan Greeley
- Isanna Revere (1772–1773), daughter of American silversmith Paul Revere
- Izannah Walker (1817–1888), American dollmaker and inventor

== Fiction ==
- Isannah Lapham, a character in the 1943 historical novel Johnny Tremain by American author Esther Forbes
