= British =

British often refers to:

- People or things associated with the island of Great Britain
  - British Isles, an island group
  - Celtic Britons, an ancient ethno-linguistic group
  - Brittonic languages, a branch of the Insular Celtic language family (formerly called British)
    - Common Brittonic, an ancient language
- People or things associated to the United Kingdom of Great Britain and Northern Ireland, a sovereign state
  - British people, nationals or natives of the United Kingdom, British Overseas Territories and Crown Dependencies
  - British Islands, legal juridisctions that constitute the principal nucleus of British sovereignty
  - British national identity, the characteristics of British people and culture
  - British English, the English language as spoken and written in United Kingdom of Great Britain and Northern Ireland and, more broadly, throughout the British Isles
  - British Monarchy, the royal family of the United Kingdom
  - British Army, one of the armed forces of the United Kingdom

British may also refer to:

== Historical regions ==
- British Empire, a historical global colonial empire
- Kingdom of Great Britain (1707–1800)
- United Kingdom of Great Britain and Ireland (1801–1922)
- British Raj, an informal empire ruled directly by the Crown on the Indian subcontinent
- British Hong Kong, colonial Hong Kong under the British Empire

== Organizations ==
- British Airways, the flag carrier airline of the United Kingdom
- British Museum, a public museum in London

== Other uses ==
- British Columbia, a province of Canada
- Brit(ish), a 2018 memoir by Afua Hirsch

== See also ==
- Terminology of the British Isles
- Alternative names for the British
- Britannic (disambiguation)
- Brit (disambiguation)
- Briton (disambiguation)
- Britain (disambiguation)
- Great Britain (disambiguation)
- United Kingdom (disambiguation)
- English (disambiguation)
- Scottish (disambiguation)
- Welsh (disambiguation)
- North Irish (disambiguation)
