= André Breton (disambiguation) =

André Breton, may refer to:

- André Breton (1896–1966), French writer and poet
- André Breton (singer) (1934–1992), Quebec-born singer

== See also ==
- André le Breton (1708–1779), French publisher
