= Berit =

Berit is a feminine given name. Notable people with the name include:

- Berit Andnor (born 1954), Swedish Social Democratic politician
- Berit Brandth (born 1947), Norwegian sociologist and gender researcher
- Berit Brogaard (born 1970), Danish and American philosopher
- Berit Carow (born 1981), German rower
- Berit Christoffersen (born 1973), Danish rower
- Berit Digre (born 1967), Norwegian team handball player and Olympic medalist
- Berit Marie Eira (born 1968), Norwegian Sami reindeer owner and politician
- Berit Granquist (1909–2001), Swedish fencer
- Berit Högman (born 1958), Swedish social democratic politician
- Berit Jóhannesson (born 1946), Swedish Left Party politician
- Berit Lindholm (1934–2023), Swedish soprano
- Berit Svendsen (born 1963), Norwegian engineer and business executive
- Berit Wallenberg (1902–1995), Swedish archaeologist, art historian, photographer and philanthropist

== See also ==
- Berith
- Berita
- Brit (disambiguation)
