= William Brittain =

William Brittain may refer to:

- William Brittain (cricketer), cricketer for Nottingham Cricket Club
- William Brittain (British Free Corps), English member of the British Free Corps
- Bill Brittain (1930–2011), American writer
- Will Brittain (born 1990), American actor

== See also ==
- William Britain (disambiguation)
