= Walter Brut =

Welsh writer tried for heresy in 1391

Walter Brut (Welsh: Gwallter Brut) was a fourteenth-century writer from the Welsh borders, whose trial in 1391 is a notable event in the history of Lollardy.

Brut described himself as "a sinner, a layman, a farmer and a Christian" in his trial for heresy which took place on 3 October 1393 before the Bishop of Hereford, Thomas Trefnant. He is mentioned in the medieval English poem Piers Plowman. About the year 1402 he joined the forces of Owain Glyndŵr.

It seems then that this Walter Brute, by nation a Briton or Welsh-man, who was "a layman and learned, and brought up in the University of Oxford, being there a graduate", was accused of saying, among sundry other things, that "the Pope is Antichrist, and a seducer of the people, and utterly against the law and life of Christ". Being called to answer, he put in first certain more brief "exhibits": then "another declaration of the same matter after a more ample tractation"; ex-plaining and setting forth from Scripture the grounds of his opinion. In either case his defense was grounded very mainly on the Revelation. For he at once bases his justification on the fact, as demonstrable, of the Pope answering alike to the chief of the false Christs prophesied of by Christ, as to come in his name; to the Man of Sin prophesied of by St. Paul: the city of Papal Rome answering also similarly to the Apocalyptic Babylon.

It is unclear, in the light of modern scholarship, whether Anthony Wood's identification of Brut with Walter Brit is sound.

== Works ==
- Theology of the Sacrament of the Altar

== Sources ==
- "Text and Controversy from Wyclif to Bale: Essays in Honour of Anne Hudson". English Historical Review, 2007, vol CXXII
- Registrum Johannis Trefnant Episcopi Herefordensis, ed. by W. W. Capes. Canterbury and York Society vol. 20 (1916).
