= Great Britain (disambiguation) =

Great Britain is a large island near the coast of Western Europe.

Great Britain may also refer to:

== Places ==
- Kingdom of Great Britain, a sovereign state from 1707 to 1800
- United Kingdom of Great Britain and Ireland, the United Kingdom from 1801 to 1927
- United Kingdom of Great Britain and Northern Ireland, a modern state from 1927

== Vehicles ==
- SS Great Britain, a passenger steamship launched in 1843 and now preserved in Bristol, United Kingdom
- Great Britain, a GWR 3031 Class locomotive, built in 1892 and retired in 1914

== Other uses ==
- Great Britain (play), by Richard Bean
- Great Britain? How We Get Our Future Back, 2024 non-fiction book by Torsten Bell
- National sports teams of the United Kingdom
- Great British Nuclear, a nuclear energy and fuels company
- Great British Railways, a planned state-owned railway company of the national railway network of Great Britain
- Great British Energy, a publicly owned energy investment company.

== See also ==
- Terminology of the British Isles
- Albion, an alternative name for Great Britain
- England
- Britannia
- British Isles
- Britain (disambiguation)
- Briton (disambiguation)
- British (disambiguation)
