= Berita (disambiguation) =

Berita is the stage name of Gugulethu Khumalo, Zimbabwean-born singer.

Berita may also refer to:

- Berita Kabwe, Zimbabwean footballer
- Berita RTM, Malaysian television news channel

== See also ==
- Berit
