= Bretton Woods =

Bretton Woods can refer to:

- Bretton Woods, New Hampshire, a village in the United States
  - Bretton Woods Mountain Resort, a ski resort located in Bretton Woods, New Hampshire
- The 1944 Bretton Woods Conference, also known as the "United Nations Monetary and Financial Conference"
- The Bretton Woods system, the international monetary system created at the 1944 Bretton Woods Conference
- The Bretton Woods twins

== See also ==
- Brenton Wood, American soul singer
- Breton Woods, New Jersey, an unincorporated community in the United States
