= Little Britain =

Little Britain may refer to:

== Arts and entertainment ==
- Little Britain (TV series), a British radio and then television series
  - Little Britain USA, an American spin-off
- "Little Britain", a song by Dreadzone from the 1995 album Second Light
- Little Britain: The Video Game

== Places ==
- 'Little Britain', a translation of several historic terms referring to Ireland
- 'Little Britain', a translation of the Irish toponym An Bhreatain Bheag, referring to Wales
- 'Little Britain', a historic designation for Brittany
- Little Britain, London, England, a street and historically a small district
- Little Britain, Buckinghamshire, England, in Greater London on the boundary with Buckinghamshire
- Little Britain, a hamlet in the parish of Exhall, Stratford-on-Avon, Warwickshire, England
- Little Britain, Ontario, Canada
- Little Britain, one of the Urban neighbourhoods of Sudbury, Ontario, Canada
- Little Britain, Mariposa Township, Ontario, Canada
- Little Britain, New York, United States
- Little Britain, Pennsylvania, United States
- Little Britain Township, Lancaster County, Pennsylvania, United States

== See also ==
- Britain (disambiguation)
- Little England (disambiguation)
- New Britain (disambiguation)
- Great Britain
