= Simon Bredon =

English priest, astronomer, mathematician, and physician

Simon Bredon (c. 1300 – 1372) was an English astronomer, mathematician, and physician and priest. He was a member of the Merton School, Oxford, elected a Fellow of Merton c. 1330, perhaps until the year 1342, having formerly been a member of Balliol. He was a Doctor of Medicine of the University of Oxford. He left manuscripts and scientific instruments to a number of Oxford colleges, perhaps including the bequest of the Oriel astrolabe (c. 1340), which is now in the Museum of the History of Science.

He was one of the earliest European mathematicians to work on trigonometry.

Authorship of the treatise The equatorie of the planetis has been attributed to Bredon, though also to Geoffrey Chaucer or another contemporary. The Theorica planetarum in the past attributed to him is now thought to be by Walter Brit.

== Bibliography ==
- Larry D. Benson, The Riverside Chaucer (3rd edn., Boston: Houghton Mifflin, 1987)
- Robert T. Gunther, Historic Instruments for the Advancement of Science: A Handbook to the Oxford Collections Prepared for the Opening of the Lewis Evans Collection on May 5, 1925 (Oxford: Oxford University Press, 1925), pp. 19–20
- Derek J. Price, ed., The equatorie of the planetis (Cambridge: Cambridge University Press, 1955)
- F. N. Robinson, The works of Geoffrey Chaucer (2nd edn., Boston: Houghton Mifflin, 1957)
- Keith Snedegar, 'Simon Bredon, a Fourteenth-Century Astronomer and Physician', in Lodi Nauta and Arjo Vanderjagt, eds., Between Demonstration and Imagination (Leiden: Brill, 1999), pp. 285–309
- C. H. Talbot, 'Simon Bredon (c. 1300–1372), Physician, Mathematician and Astronomer', British Journal for the History of Science 1 (1962), 19–30
