= Clarissa Britain =

American inventor (1816–1895)

- Born: 1816; Brownville, New York, U.S.
- Died: October 27, 1895 (aged 78–79); Baton Rouge, Louisiana, U.S.
- Resting place: Magnolia Cemetery (Baton Rouge, Louisiana)
- Education: Troy Female Seminary, 1839
- Occupations: Educator and inventor
- Employer(s): Washington Female Seminary; Niles Female Seminary; Troy Female Seminary; Wheeling Female Seminary; Kemper Hall
- Family: Calvin Britain, brother

Clarissa Britain (1816 – October 27, 1895) was a 19th-century American inventor and educator. She received seven patents in a span of eighteen months from early 1863 to 1864. Patent historian Autumn Stanley notes that Britain was "one of the most prolific American women inventors at the time, certainly the most prolific pantentee." Britain was also the founder and principal of Niles Female Seminary in Niles, Michigan.

== Early life ==
Britain was born in Brownville, New York in 1816 into a prominent, middle-class family. Her parents were Mary (née Cole) and Calvin Britain, who was a major-general in the War of 1812. Because of her socioeconomic position, Britain received a good education. She attended the Black River Literary and Religious Institute of Rev. James R. Boyd in Waterford, New York.

In 1830, Britain became qualified to teach in district schools. She taught for several years in district schools near her home in Brownville. In 1838, she enrolled in Emma Willard's Troy Female Seminary in Troy, New York, and graduated in 1839.

== Career ==
After graduating from seminary, Britain took a position as an assistant at the Washington Female Seminary in Washington, Pennsylvania, working under principal Sarah Hanna, also a former student of Emma Willard. She then took a position in Batavia, New York, where she was in charge of a school.

In 1841, Britain moved to Niles, Michigan and lived with her unmarried brother, serving as his housekeeper and hostess. Her brother, Calvin Britain, was the founder of St. Joseph, Michigan, and later was the lieutenant governor of Michigan. While in Michigan, she established and was the principal of the Niles Female Seminary, from December 1841 until 1848 when she sold the school.

Britain moved back to Troy and taught criticism and rhetoric at Troy Female Seminary from 1850 to 1853. She then moved to Beaufort, South Carolina, to be closer to her sister, Martha Johnston, and taught school there for three years. She left Beaufort and spent three years as vice principal at Hanna's Wheeling Female Seminary in Wheeling, West Virginia, before returning to Beaufort.

While she was in Beaufort the second time, the South seceded from the North in 1860. Britain lived six miles away from the Battle of Port Royal in 1861. In 1862, her brother, Calvin, died, and she traveled the 900 miles back to St. Joseph, Michigan, to settle his estate. Her route for this trip is unknown, but likely included areas in conflict during the war.

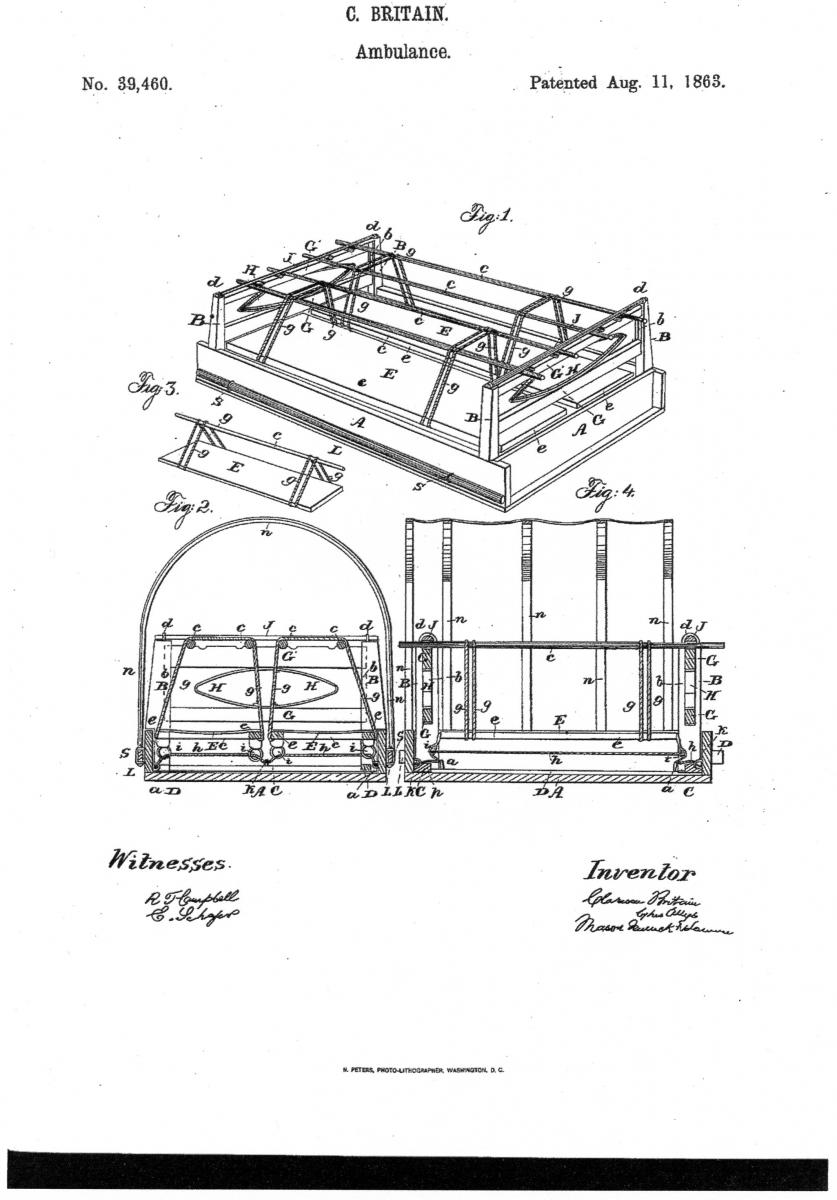
Drawing from Britain's "improvement in ambulances" patent

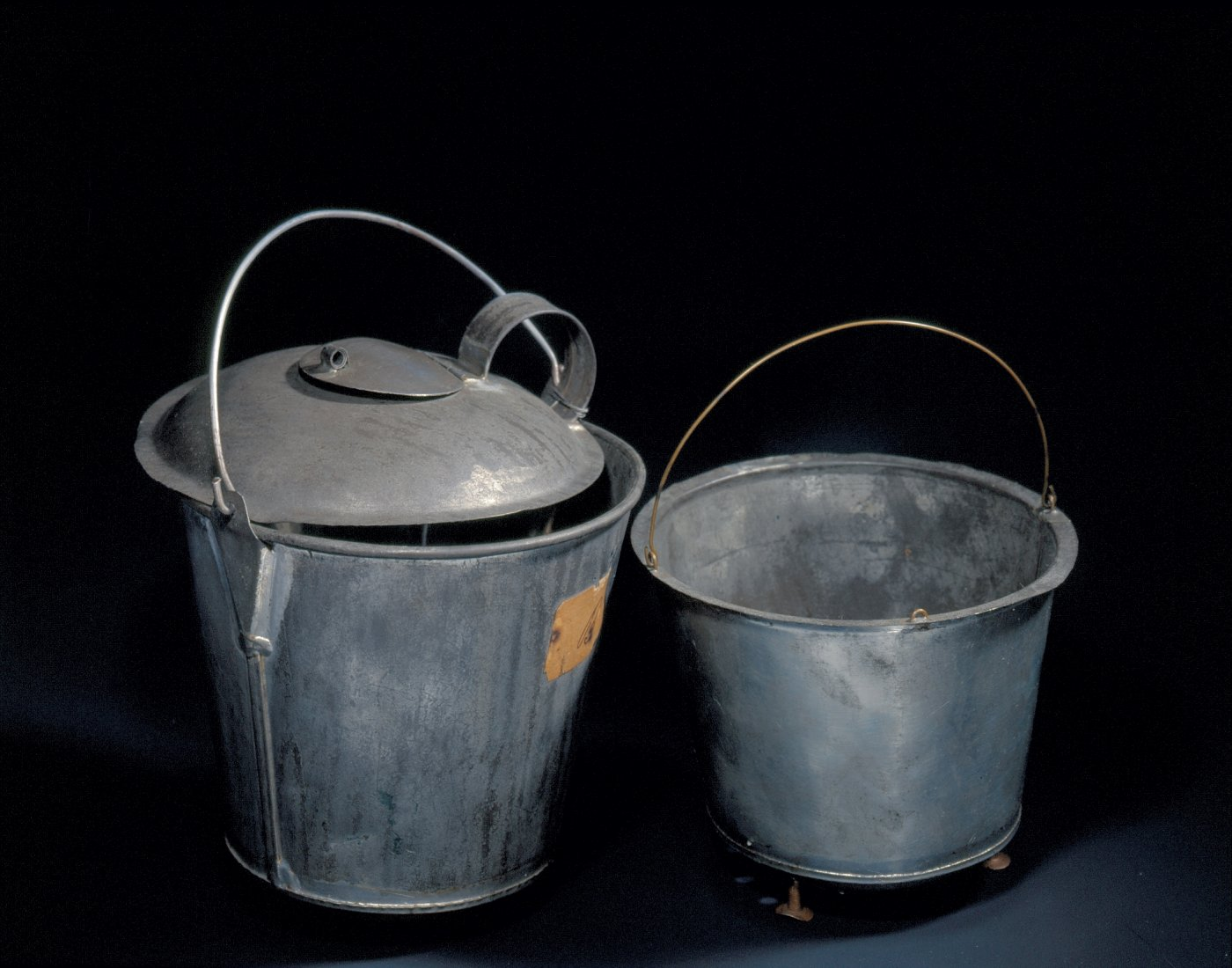
Patent model for Improvement in vegetable boilers

After settling her brother's estate in 1863, Britain's professional life turned from teaching to inventions. In the span of eighteen months from early 1863 to 1864, Britain applied for and received seven patents. Jessie Kranz notes that Britain's patents "provide an insight into how her Civil War travels possibly gave her inspiration and firsthand experience". Her first patent was for a floor warmer. Another patent was for an ambulance improvement to help with the removal of the wounded and bodies from the battlefield. Several others were for cooking improvements, and one was for a dinner pail for miners, which included a light, a food-warming mechanism, and eating utensils. Patent historian Autumn Stanley notes that Britain was "one of the most prolific American women inventors at the time, certainly the most prolific pantentee."

However, it appears that she never made any money from her inventions. Britain moved to Kenosha, Wisconsin in 1866, where she worked as the principal at Kemper Hall for a year. Later, she taught school in Chicago. The 1880 United States census lists her occupation as a retired teacher.

== Personal life ==
Britain lived in at least seven different states during her lifetime. Her family was the main reason for her transitory lifestyle. In 1867, Britain returned to South Carolina to take care of her sister's seven children after their mother died. She then moved to Chicago in 1870, with the children and their father. After the children became grown, she returned to St. Joseph, Michigan, to live with her sister, Isabella.

When her health declined, Britain moved to Baton Rouge, Louisiana, to live with her sister, Mrs. J. W. Burgess. She died in at the home of Judge J. W. Burgess in Baton Rouge on October 27, 1895 at the age of 80. Britain was buried in Magnolia Cemetery in Baton Rouge.

== Inventions ==
Patent No.	Patent date	Description	References
37,851	March 10, 1863	Floor warmer	
39,460	August 11, 1863	Improvement on ambulances	
40,157	October 6, 1863	Improvements in boilers	
41,274	January 19, 1864	improved lantern dinner pail	
43,087	June 14, 1864	Improvement in vegetable boilers	
43,088	June 14, 1864	Improved dish-drainer	
44,393	September 27, 1864	Improvement in lamp-burners	
