= Little England =

Little England may refer to:

== Places ==
- Australia, a colloquial term formerly used to describe the country
- Little England (Gloucester, Virginia), an historic plantation house in the U.S.
- Little England beyond Wales, southwest Wales
- Historic Little England, formerly Victoria Boulevard Historic District, Hampton, Virginia, U.S.
- Barbados, see Geography of Barbados
- Thally, Tamilnadu, India
- Mirpur, Azad Kashmir, Pakistan
- Nuwara Eliya, Central Province, Sri Lanka

== Other ==
- A term for a non-imperial England or United Kingdom as advocated by the Little Englander movement
- Little England (film), a 2013 Greek film
- Little England (TV series), a British documentary show
- A realm in "The Great Game", a volume of the comic book Die

== See also ==
- Little Britain (disambiguation)
