= Star Motor Company =

UK automobile manufacturer

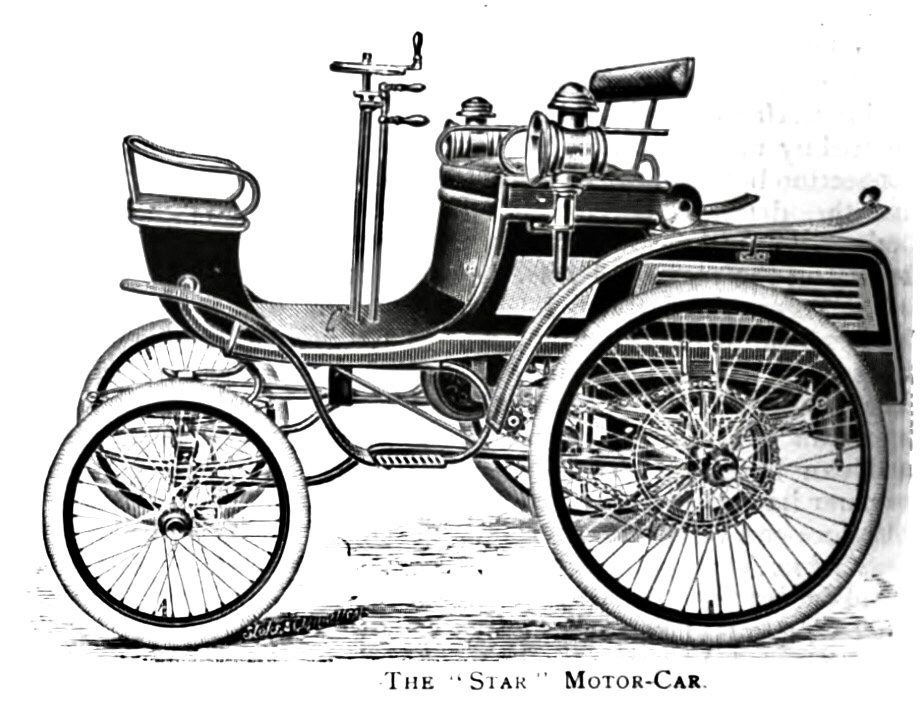
Star motor car (1899)

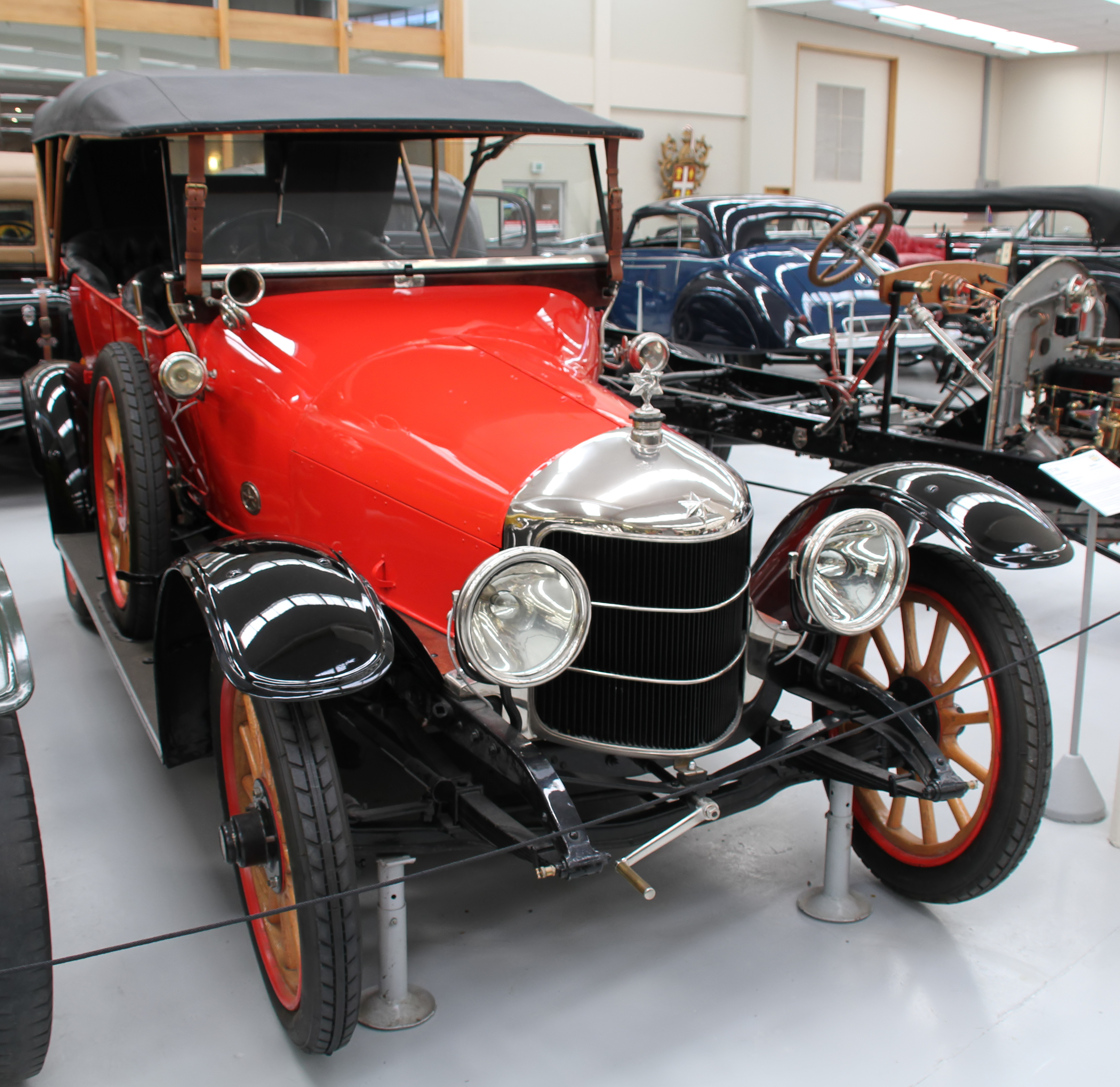
20.1 hp tourer 1914

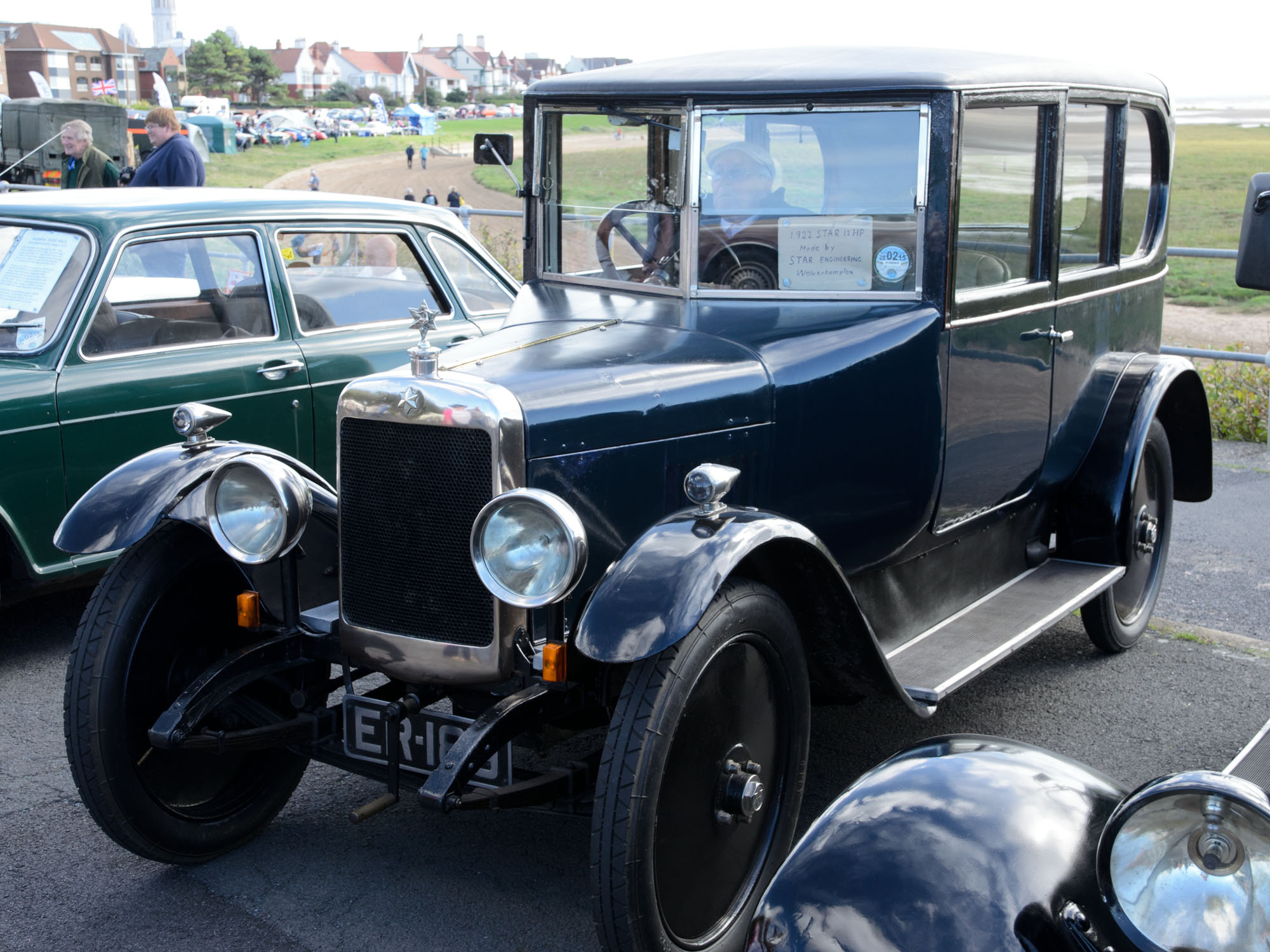
11.9 saloon 1922

The Star Motor Company was a British car and commercial vehicle maker based in Wolverhampton and active from 1898 to 1932. At its peak Star was the UK's sixth largest car manufacturer and produced around 1000 cars a year.

Star was founded by the Lisle family who like many other vehicle makers started by making bicycles, in their case in 1893 as Sharratt and Lisle. In 1896 this was changed to the Star Cycle Company.

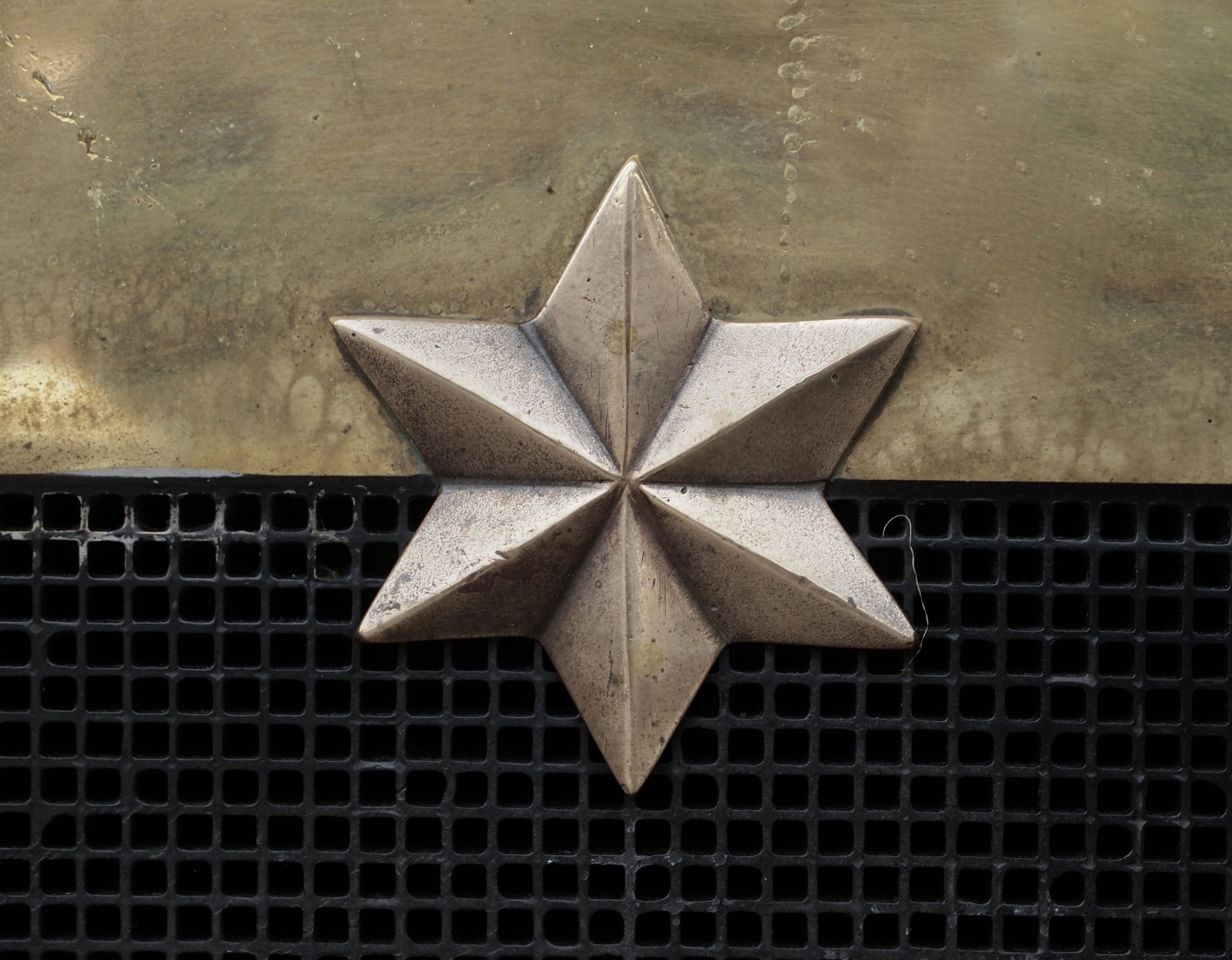
The badge of the Star Motor Company, as depicted on its 1904 Gordon Bennett Cup racer.

== History ==
=== Foundation and bicycles ===
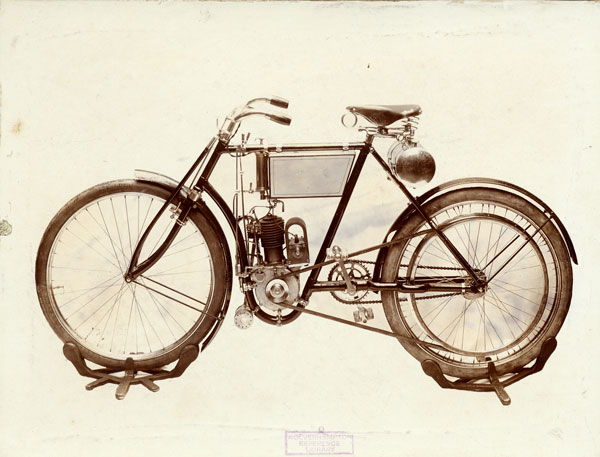
Star Motorcycle

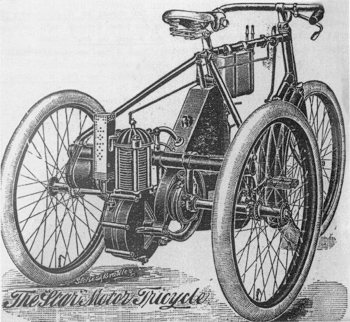
Star tricycle advert in 1899

Edward Lisle built his own first bicycle in the early 1870s and had enough success racing it that he began to build additional bicycles to order. In 1876, he partnered with William Sharratt to increase production, but that partnership only lasted three years. In 1883, Edward Lisle founded the Star Cycle Company. Besides safety bicycles, models included tandems and a Pedersen. In 1889 the company purchased a factory on Stewart Street and by 1899, production reached 10,000 cycles per year, and by 1904 Star was the largest Wolverhampton based bicycle manufacturer.

=== Expansion and automobiles ===
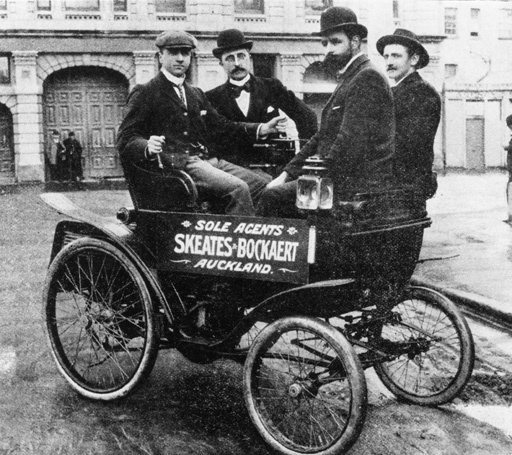
1898 Star in Auckland, New Zealand

Planning for the Star car began in 1897 when the company acquired a 3.5 hp Benz car and used it as the basis for the design of their own car. The early vehicles were heavily influenced by existing car makers and the 1898 3.5 was essentially a single-cylinder 3.5 hp Benz and often called the Star-Benz; it had two speeds, chain drive, wire spoke wheels, acetylene lighting, electric ignition, and Clipper pneumatic tires standard, for £189. Star then purchased the rights to produce Star-Benz cars in Wolverhampton and began production at the Stewart Street Works. The cars were now being sold under the Star Motor Company name, a registered subsidiary of Star Engineering Limited, who adopted a policy of building as much as possible in-house. The Star-Benz model sold well and around 250 were made. The cars initially sold for £189 but in 1900 they were selling for £168 and the company was producing 20 a week.

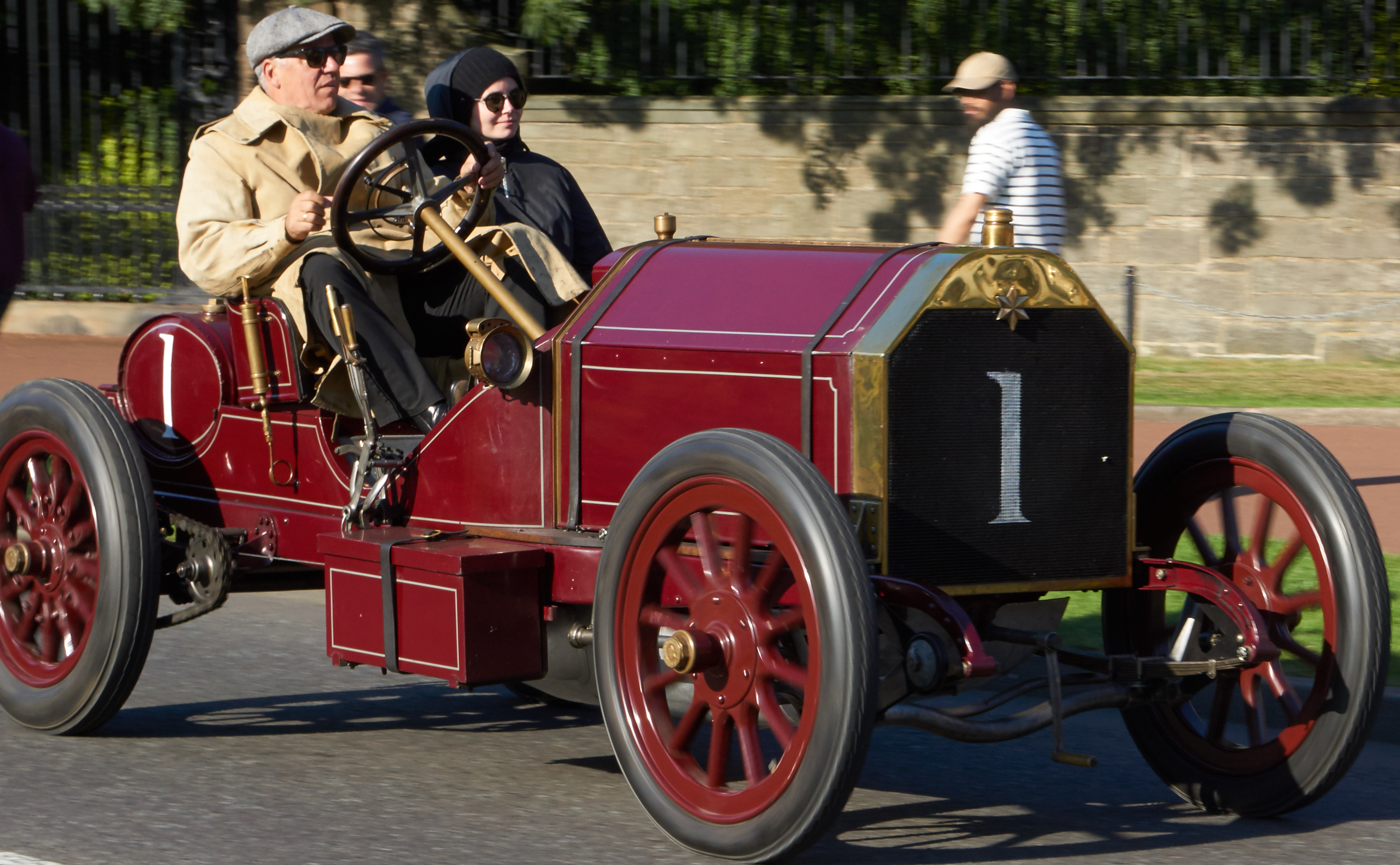
1904 Gordon Bennett entrant

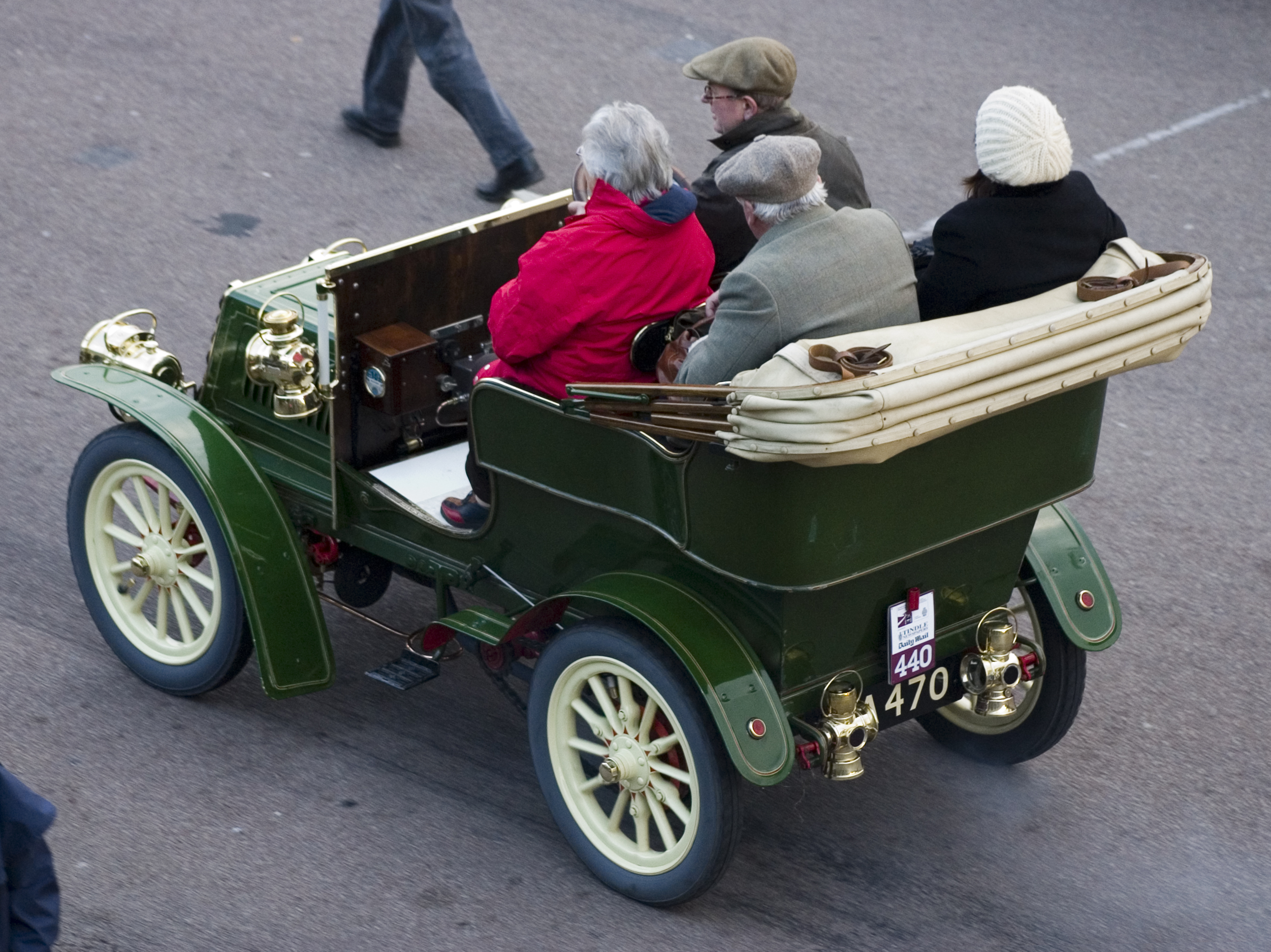
1904 tonneau 748 cc

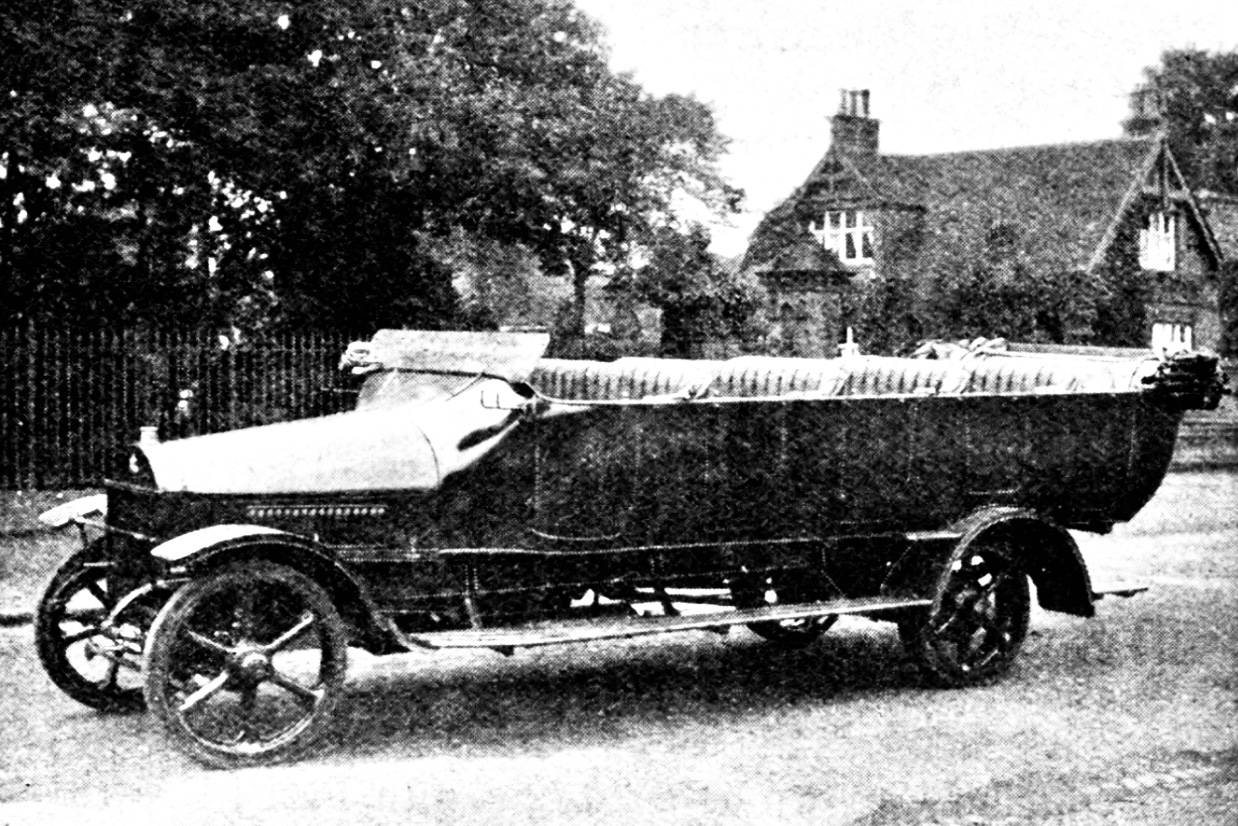
Star Motor Coach (1917)

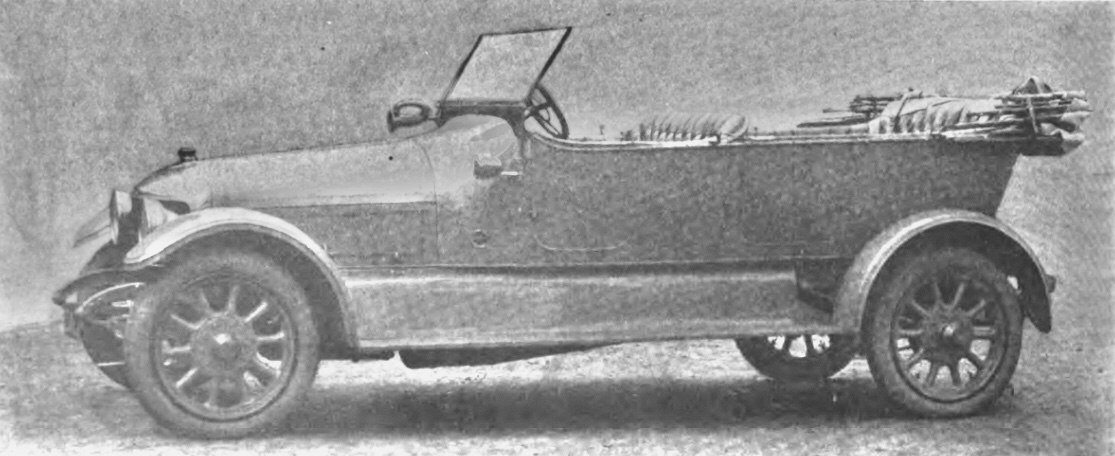
Star 15.9 (1913-1924)

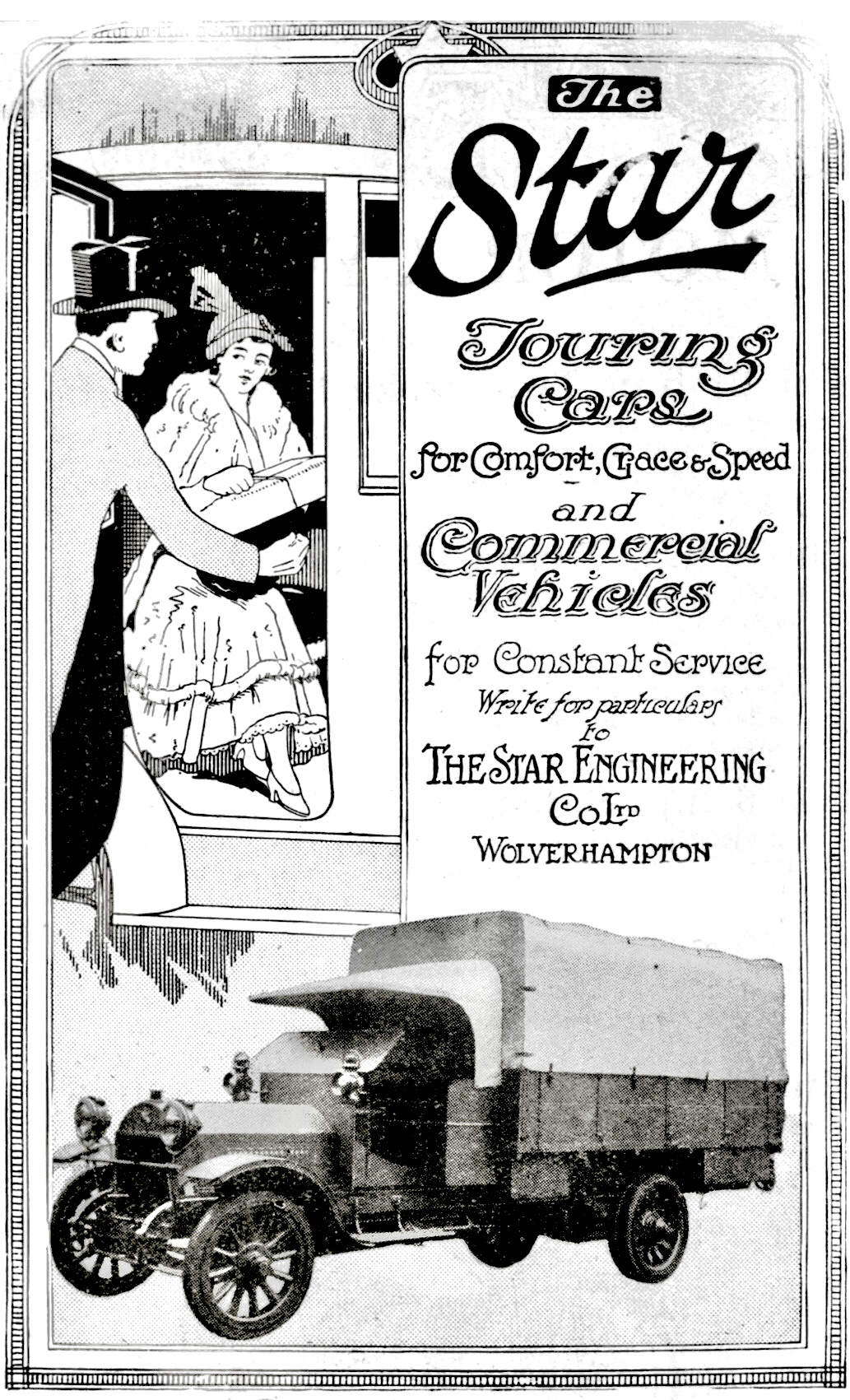
Star Commercial Vehicles (~1917)

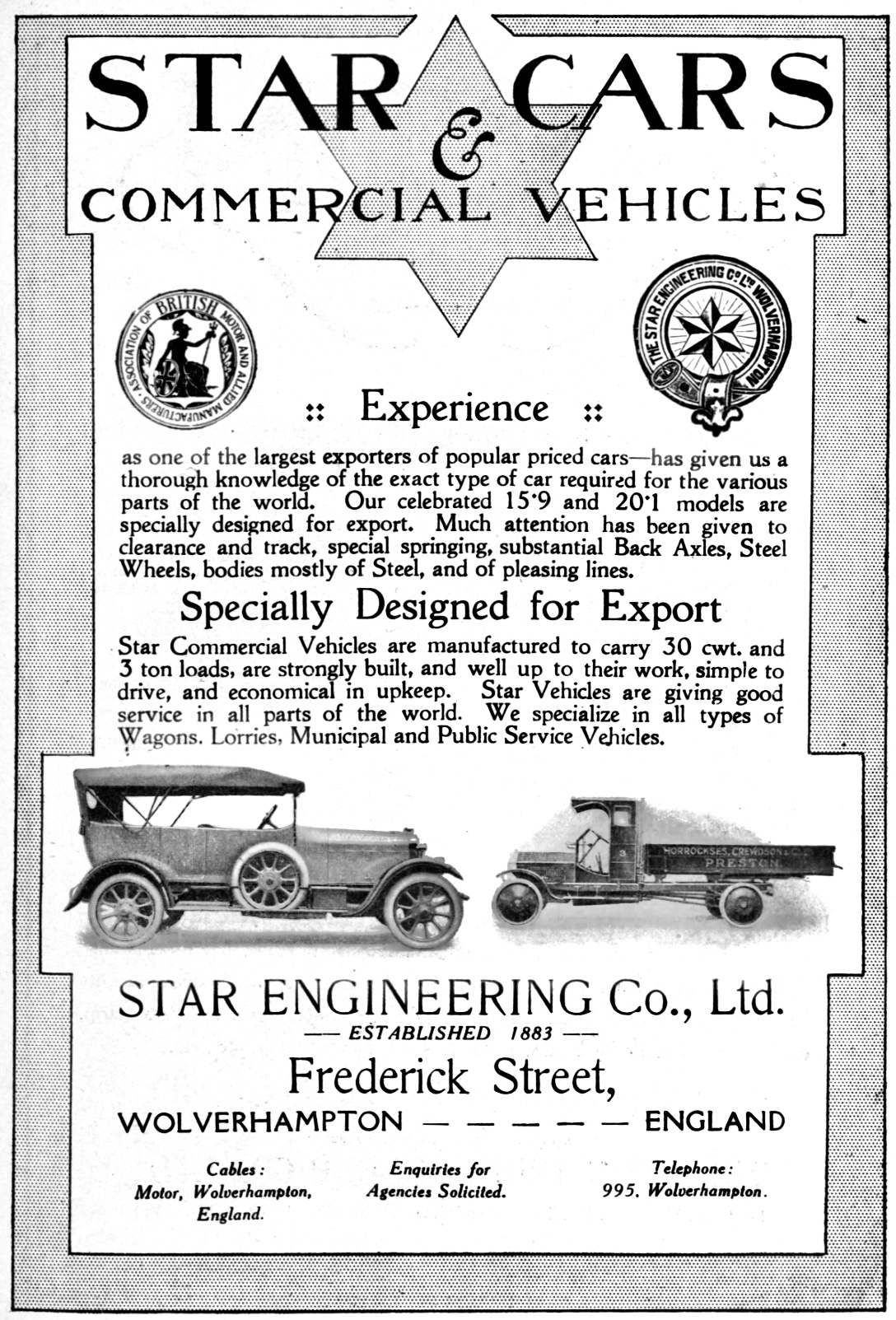
Star advertisement (1920)

One a week was being made in 1899, and in the first year, they made their first export sale, to Auckland, New Zealand. Exports became a major part of Star's business, particularly to Australia and New Zealand. In 1891 Lisle had adopted a 6 pointed star as their logo which led to a successful suit against Mercedes in 1902 where it was found they had infringed Star's copyright with their 3 or 4 pointed star emblem. In 1900, production had expanded to facilities in Dudley Road and Nelson, Stewart, Ablow, and Dobb Streets. A two-cylinder three-speed model appeared that year, also, at the Richmond Automobile Club Show. Encouraged by founder Edward Lisle, they were also being entered in the 1000 Miles' Trial (where it proved fragile), along with "every test or competition for which they were eligible". In 1901, the 7 and 10 with vertical twin De Dion engines and in 1902 a four-cylinder 20 hp appeared. In 1903, copying the leading maker, Mercedes, Star introduced a 12 hp four, and set a record of 39 mph (63 km/h) on a 2-mile (3.2 km) run in County Cork, Ireland, under the auspices of the Irish Automobile Club. In addition, two Stars ran in the Isle of Man qualifying races for the Gordon Bennett Cup; neither 10-litre car made it. From 1904 only four-cylinder models were made.

In 1902 the Star Motor Company changed its name to the Star Engineering company. The company rapidly expanded and diversified, expanding the Stewart Street works and obtaining additional premises in neighbouring streets. The company built a new factory in 1903 on a 40,000sq.ft. sit on Frederick Street. Star began to create their own more advanced designs and in 1903 several new models were released. Particularly popular was the 'Little Star' model released in early 1904 which had a 7 hp. twin cylinder engine and sold for £175.

For 1906, there was a new 3261 cc (200 ci) 14 hp four, as well as a new six, the 6227 cc (380 ci) 30 hp; the six, increased in displacement to 6981 cc (426 ci) in 1909, lasted until 1911. The main Star company continued to make well engineered models up to the outbreak of war in 1914 adding a range of vans and trucks to the output and became one of the six largest British car makers.

The Star Cycle Company run by Lisle's son, also called Edward, had continued in business building bicycles and motorcycles and in 1905 entered the car industry in its own right. The company was affected by the deep depression that hit the bicycle industry in 1905. In order to combat the decline in sales Star decided to produce a cheaper car called the 'Starling' that sold for £110. Although the name of these cars was changed to 'Stuart' the 'Starling name was readopted in 1907 and production continued until 1909. In 1907, there was a 1296 cc (79 ci) single and a 1531 cc (94 ci) twin and the Stuart (Starling after 1907), with chassis from Hopper, a Barton-upon-Humber cycle maker (which sold them as Torpedoes). The decision was taken in 1909 to make the Star Engineering Company a limited liability company with the Star Cycle Company becoming a subsidiary company. Joseph Lisle, one of Edward's sons, was appointed managing director of the company. To avoid confusion a new company, the Briton Motor Company was formed in 1909 and the products were badged as Britons. Briton took control of production of the 'Starling' and 'Stuart' and the first two cars were a 2282 cc (139 ci) 12 hp twin and a 2413 cc (147 ci) 14 hp four; the 14 hp (10 kW) became available as a Star in 1910.

Star proper took advantage of export sales, and saw racing success in South Africa, a 14 hp (10 kW) winning the Transvaal Automobile Club hillclimb, and the New Zealand national hillclimb championship. For 1913, there was a 1743 cc (106 ci) Briton, which became the 10/12 in 1914. Stars accorded themselves well in the 1909 Irish Reliability Trial, while a 12 hp (8.9 kW) won its class in all the hillclimbs of the Scottish Automobile Club trial, where a new 2862 cc (175 ci) '15 hp' (actually 19.6 hp) debuted; it would persist three years.

In 1912, Star introduced the torpedo-bodied 15.9 hp, with a 3016 cc (184 ci; 80x150mm) four and new bullnosed radiator; originally for export, it proved aesthetically pleasing, and was adopted for all models. It was quick, as well, running an RAC trial of 801 mile (1289 km) at Brooklands at an average 66.75 mph (107.42 km/h) that year. The 15.9 would remain in production until 1922.

=== First World War and after ===
Like many companies during the First World War Star came under control of the government, devoting their output to the war effort. Commercial vehicles were made for the British, French and Russian armies but Star's main contribution was the production of aircraft wings and parts for mines. In 1918 the company accepted an order to produce 400 V8 Renault engines but had only built 12 by the time the war ended and military contracts were cancelled.

Following the war, prices in the car market fluctuated greatly. Post-war inflation pushed prices up with the cost of some Star cars reaching above £1000, making them effectively unsaleable. However, as the economy entered recession prices dropped dramatically and Star was able to introduce a new range of models at cheaper prices. The 11.9 hp model performed well, selling at a rate of 20 a week for the next few years.

Post-war car production resumed in 1919 with the pre-war 15.9 hp (11.9 kW) and 3815 cc 20.1 hp Star, and the 10/12 Briton, models and in the early 1920s Star were making 1000 cars a year from their cramped workshops. Briton, however, went under in 1922, a victim of the postwar economic slump, being bought by C.A. Weight; the last four Britons were exported to Australia in 1929. A more up-to-date model, with a 1795 cc (110ci) sidevalve was introduced in 1921, with the same high quality.

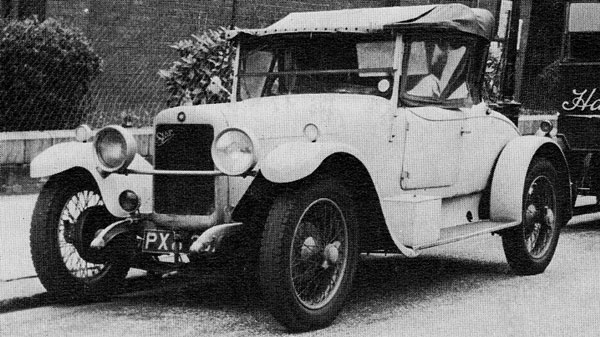
14-40 two-seater, 2-litre ohv 4-cyl, 1926

The death of founder Edward Lisle in 1921 was a major blow for Star. At the time Star had been attempting to bail out the ailing Briton Motor Company which put the company under a lot of pressure. Edward was succeeded by Joseph (formerly head of Star Engineering). Despite these setbacks, Stars entered two 11.9hps in the Scottish Six Days' Light Car Trials, placing first and second in the hands of R. Lisle and G.G.Cathie; the winner was sold to New Zealand, where it proved dominant in local racing, while a different 11.9 swept the Australian 1000 Mile Alpine Test. This car developed into the 1945 cc (119ci) 12/25 in 1924, followed by a pushrod overhead valve 12/40 with four-wheel brakes (then a rarity) and four-speed gearbox, capable of 80 mph (129 km/h). It was joined by an 18/40 six, as well as lorries of 25cwt, 34-40cwt, and 50-60cwt, all powered by the 12/25 engine. Star avoided any major damage as the Briton Motor Company name and facilities were sold off, allowing production levels at Star to continue rising.

=== Later years and takeover ===
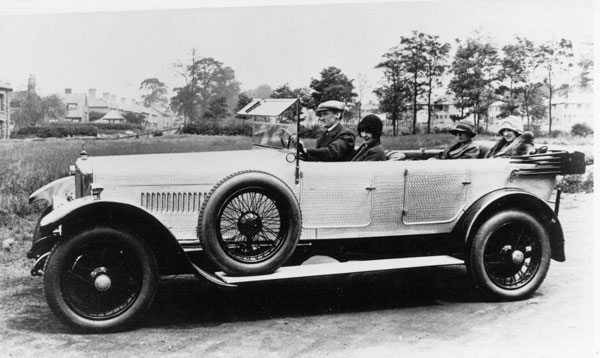
Mercury

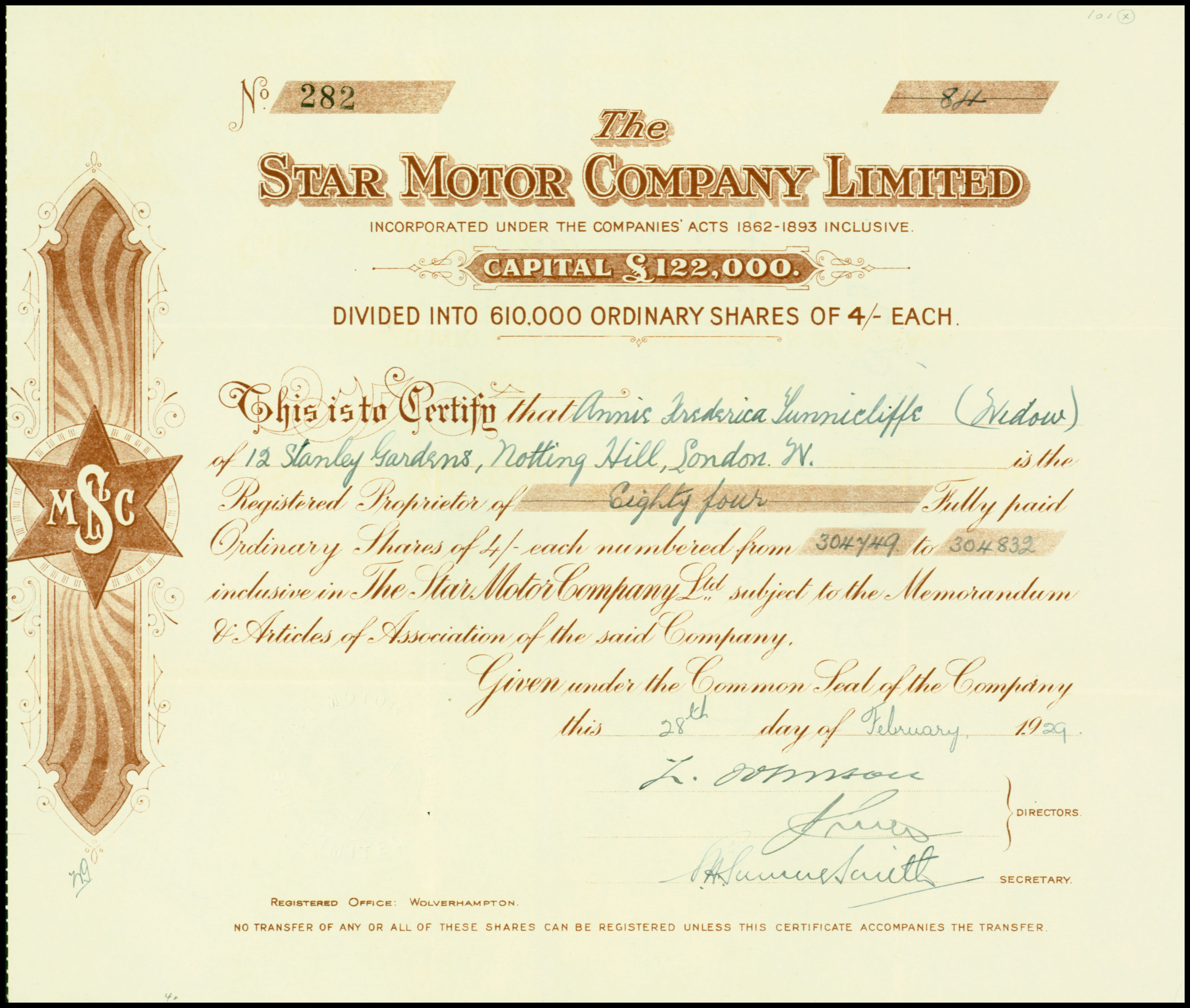
Share of the Star Motor Company Ltd., issued 28. February 1929

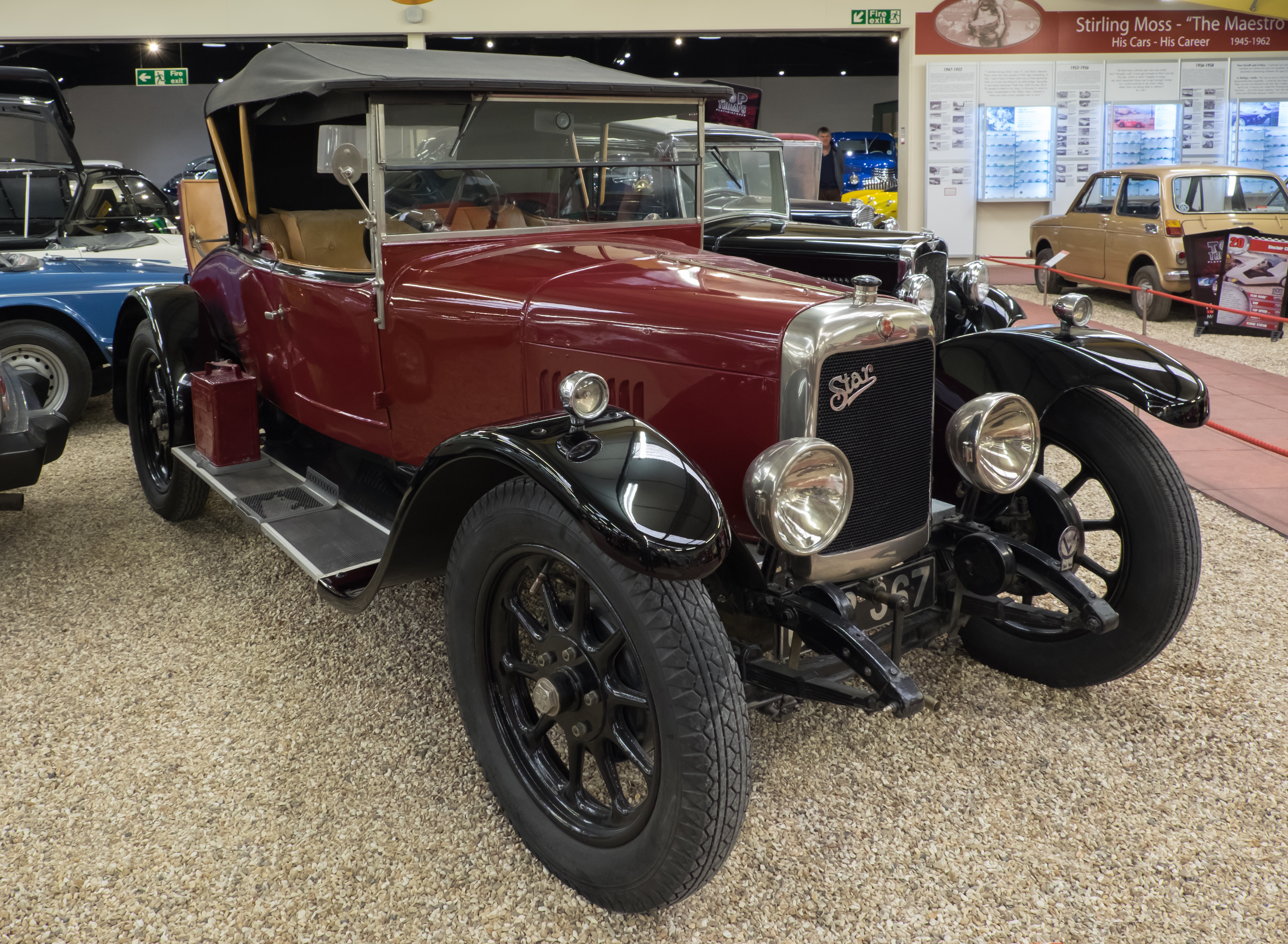
1926 Star Scorpio

Despite producing at record levels between 1921 and 1925, making around 1000 cars a year, Star was still not making much of a profit on their sales. The company continued to release upgraded new models but the time spent making the components and assembling the cars meant Star cars were very expensive in comparison to companies such as Austin and Morris. The mass production techniques embraced by these companies allowed them to produce their cars a much cheaper prices, so while Star continued to produce cars of the same quality and reliability they eventually found themselves squeezed out of the market. Combined with the recession of the late 1920s this meant that Star could only produce 105 cars in 1927.

As a result of this Star entered a financially precarious state and in 1928 fellow Wolverhampton manufacturer Guy Motors took control through an exchange of shares. Star did continue to exist as a separate company, operating under the name of the Star Motor Company Limited. As part of this new arrangement Star's old factory on Frederick Street was closed down and sold off and production was moved to another of Star's sites on Showell Lane in Bushbury near the Clyno factory. From here came the new 18/50, a 2470 cc (ci) six, with wet cylinder liners, duralumin connecting rods, aluminium pistons, seven bearing crankshaft, which in 1930 were redone as the Comet and Planet. Star cars were now built entirely under one roof while the workforce was reduced to 250 and the range of models reduced in order to reduce competition with Guy products.

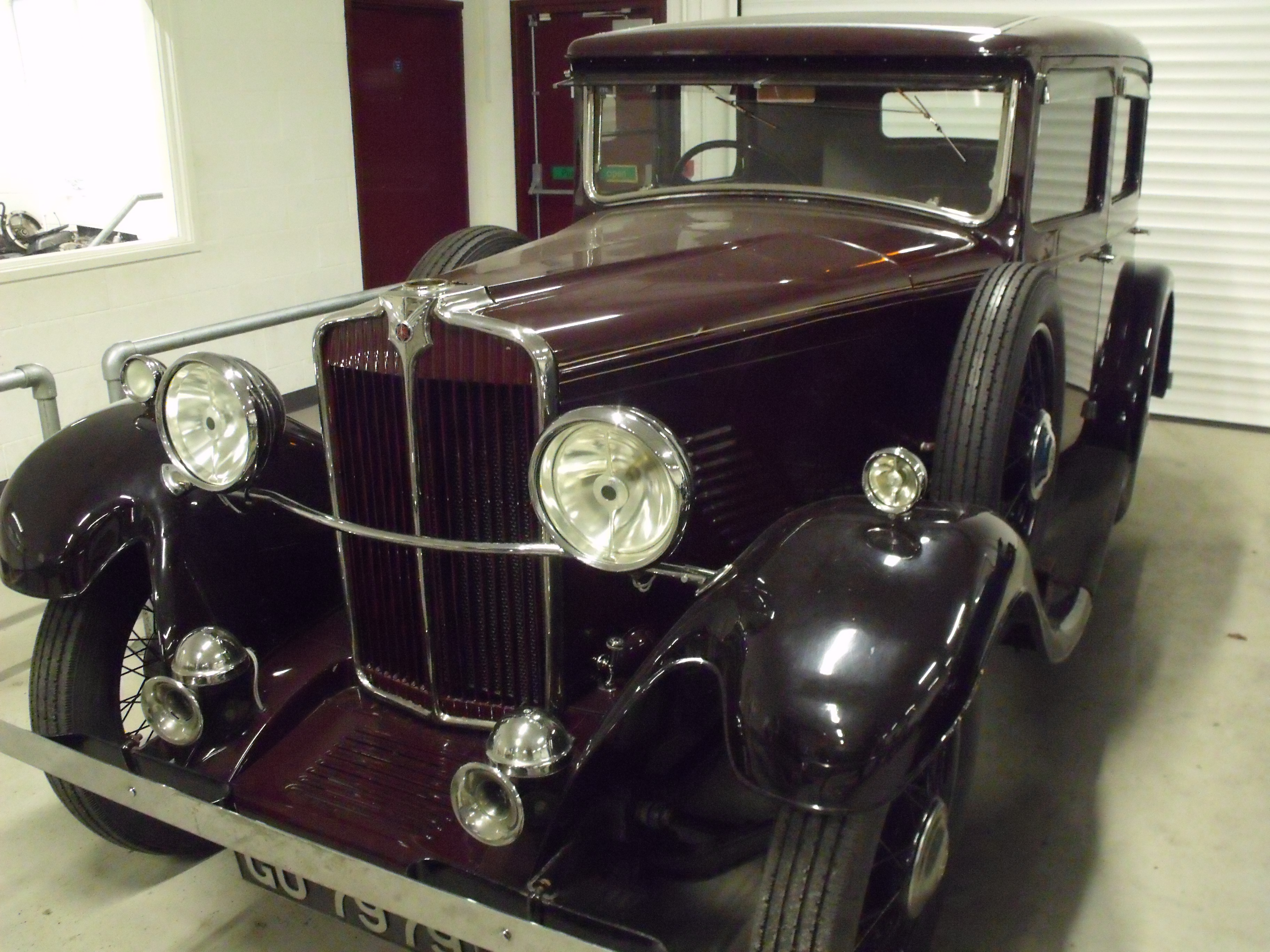
Comet 18, 1931

Under the management of Guy, Star continued to produce quality cars although they proved to be far too expensive for ordinary people. The 'Comet', 'Planet' and 'Jason' models were introduced in 1930, the 18/50 hp. 'Jason' proving the most popular, selling at £595. Various versions of these models were released, including coupés, limousines and tourers. However a loss was still being made on every model sold and with Guy having their own financial troubles they could not afford to modernise Star's Bushbury plant. With nowhere left to turn a receiver was appointed for Star in March 1932. The spares and manufacturing rights of the company were sold off to McKenzie and Denley (Birmingham), which continued to have Star cars and NOS parts catalogued in 1962., while the Bushbury factory was acquired by Manley & Regulus, who produced plumbing fittings.

== Star cars (main models) ==
Type	Year	Approx Production	Engine	Notes
3.5	1898–1902		1296 cc single-cylinder	
7 hp	1900–1904		1104 cc twin-cylinder	De Dion engine.
10 hp	1902–1903		2588 cc twin-cylinder	12 bhp (8.9 kW) at 800 rpm.
20 hp	1902–1903		5176 cc four-cylinder	24 bhp (18 kW) at 800 rpm.
12 hp	1904		2830 cc four-cylinder	16 bhp (12 kW) at 1000 rpm.
18 hp	1904–1908		4170 cc four-cylinder	
24 hp	1904		4815 cc four-cylinder	
15 hp	1909–1913		2830/3160/3459 cc four-cylinder	2830 cc in 1909. 121 inch (3.07 m) wheelbase.
30 hp	1906		4740/6980 cc six-cylinder	120 inch (3.04 m)wheelbase.
40 hp	1907–11		6980 cc six-cylinder	140 inch (3.55 m) wheelbase.
15.9	1913–1924	800	3012 cc four-cylinder	Four speed gearbox. In chassis only form cost between £750-825.
20.1	1912–1923	100	3815 cc four-cylinder	Same engine as 15.9 but with larger bore.
11.9	1921–1923	2000	1795 cc four-cylinder	Three speed gearbox. Saloon version cost £750.
Six	1923–1927	250	2916 or 3265 cc six-cylinder	18 and 20 hp (15 kW) versions. Four wheel brakes optional from 1924, standard from 1925. 70 mph (110 km/h) top speed.
14/30 and 14/40	1924–1927	1000	2176 or 2120 cc four-cylinder	Four wheel brakes optional. Four speed gearbox.
12/25 and 12/40	1923–1928	2000	1945 cc four-cylinder	Four speed gearbox. 12/40 engine was the first Star to have overhead valves.
18/50	1926–1932	1000	2470/2920 cc six-cylinder	Named Jason for 1928 and Comet 18/50 from 1930 and Comet 18 in 1931.
20/60	1928–1932	175	3180/3620 cc six-cylinder	Named the Comet 20/60 and then the Planet 21.
Planet 21	1928–1932		3180/3620 cc six-cylinder	The Planet 24 had the larger engine. Hector saloon and Perseus coupé and tourers.
Comet 14	1932	Few made.	2100 cc six-cylinder	Saloon or coupé. Bendix brakes.

== See also ==
- List of car manufacturers of the United Kingdom
