= Berith =

Berith, Berit, or Brit (Hebrew: ברית) may refer to:

- Covenants in Hebrew, particularly
  - The biblical covenant between God and Israel
  - Brit milah, ceremony of circumcision
  - Berit Rihitzah, "Covenant of Washing" for girls
  - Brit Bat, "Covenant of the Daughter", Jewish naming ceremony for newborn girls
- Baal Berith, Canaanite deity
- Berit Menuchah, practical Kabbalah work

== See also ==
- Berit, given name
- Brit (disambiguation)
