= Afua Hirsch =

British writer and broadcaster (born 1981)

Afua Hirsch FRSL
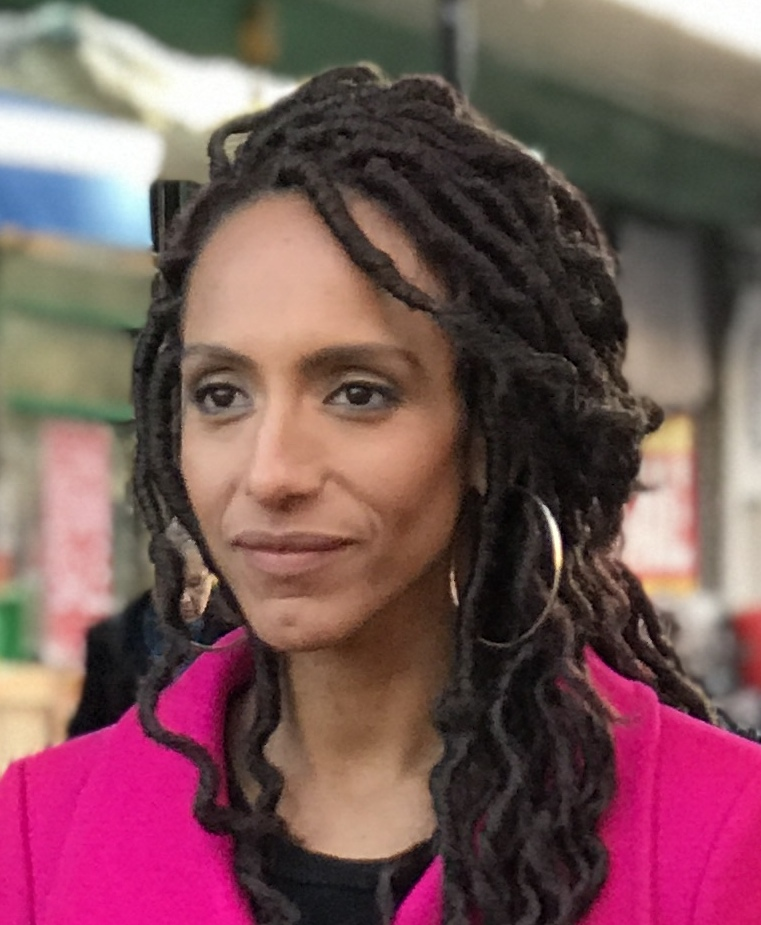
- Hirsch in 2017
- Born: 1981 (age 44–45); Stavanger, Norway
- Education: Wimbledon High School; St Peter's College, Oxford (BA); BPP Law School
- Occupations: Journalist, broadcaster
- Notable work: Brit(ish): On Race, Identity and Belonging (2018)
- Children: 1
- Relatives: Peter Hirsch (great-uncle)
- Website: afuahirsch.com

Afua Hirsch (born 1981) is a British writer and broadcaster. She has worked as a journalist for The Guardian newspaper, and was the Social Affairs and Education Editor for Sky News from 2014 until 2017. She is the author of the 2018 book Brit(ish): On Race, Identity and Belonging, receiving a Jerwood Award while writing it. Hirsch was elected a Fellow of the Royal Society of Literature in 2024.

== Early life ==
Afua Hirsch was born in Stavanger, Norway, to a British father, Peter Hirsch, and a Ghanaian mother, Mary Owusu-Hirsch, and was raised in Wimbledon, southwest London. Her paternal grandfather, Hans (later John), who was Jewish, fled Berlin in 1938. Her great-uncle was the metallurgist Sir Peter Hirsch. Her maternal grandfather, who graduated from the University of Cambridge, was involved in establishing the post-independence education system in Ghana but later became a political exile.

Hirsch was educated at the private Wimbledon High School, and then studied philosophy, politics, and economics at St Peter's College, Oxford (1999–2002). After graduating with a Bachelor of Arts degree, she took the Graduate Diploma in Law at the BPP Law School. She qualified as a barrister in 2006 and trained at Doughty Street Chambers.

== Career ==
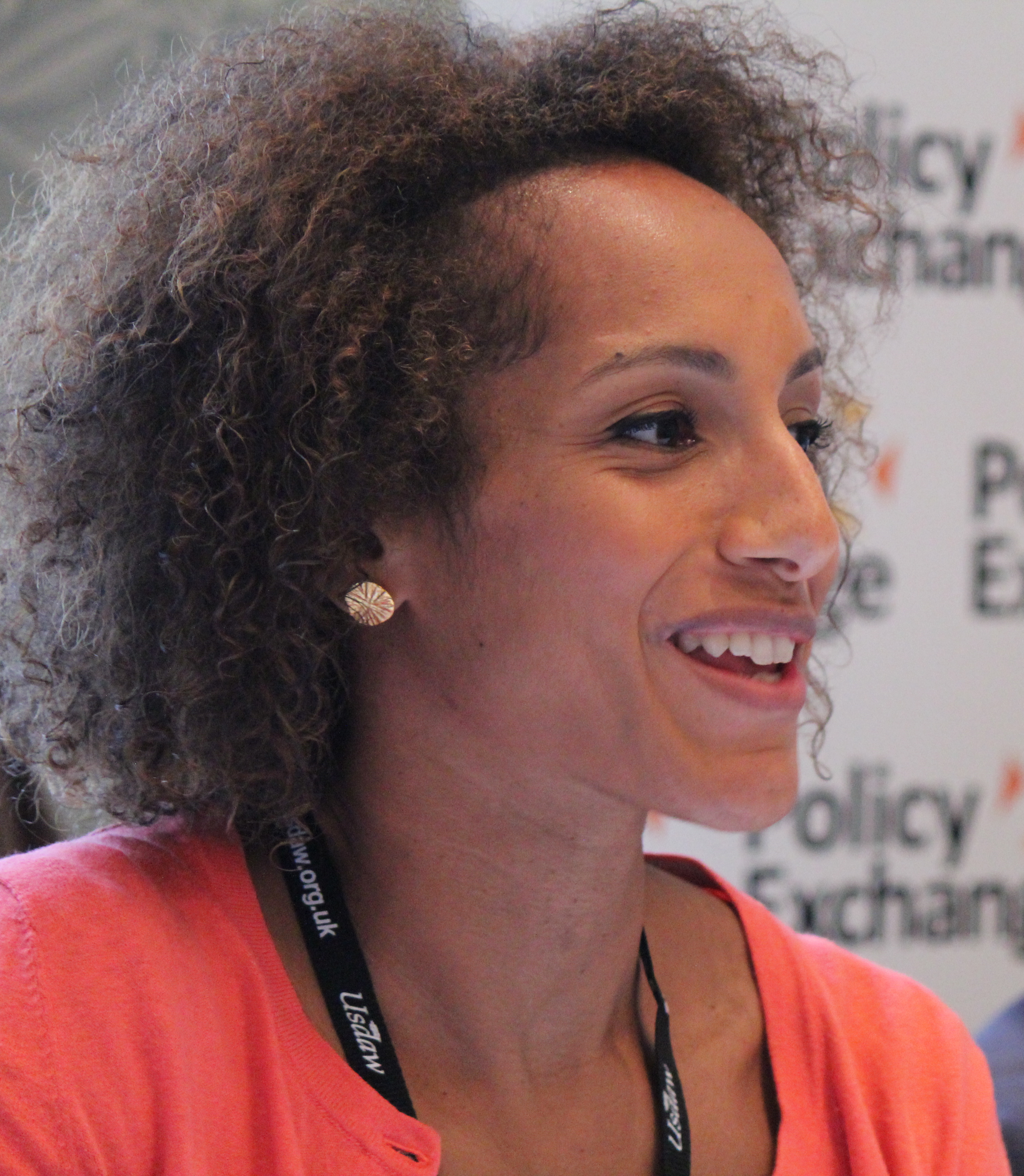
Hirsch in 2014

=== Journalism ===
Hirsch was a legal correspondent for The Guardian. She has lived in Britain and Senegal, and served as The Guardian's West Africa correspondent, based in Accra, Ghana. From 2014 to 2017, she was the Social Affairs and Education Editor at Sky News.

Among other publications and outlets for which she has written are The Observer, The Evening Standard, Vogue, and Prospect.

Hirsch contributed the piece "What Does It Mean to Be African?" to Margaret Busby's 2019 anthology New Daughters of Africa.

==== Guardian article about Nelson's Column ====
In August 2017, in The Guardian, Hirsch questioned whether Nelson's Column should remain in place, with the implication it might be removed. Not long afterward, the art historian and former museum director Sir Roy Strong said the suggestion the column should be taken down was a "ridiculous" viewpoint, commenting: "Once you start rewriting history on that scale, there won't be a statue or a historic house standing....The past is the past. You can't rewrite history." The following May, Hirsch said the idea of removing Nelson's Column distracted from her main point that Britain should look more carefully at its past to understand itself better today. In an article introducing her television documentary, The Battle for Britain's Heroes, Hirsch stated that she "wasn't actually waiting in a bulldozer, ready to storm Trafalgar Square, as some people seemed to believe".

=== Publications ===
==== Brit(ish) ====
Hirsch's book Brit(ish): On Race, Identity and Belonging (ISBN 9781911214281) was published by Jonathan Cape in January 2018. The book is part-memoir and discusses black history, culture and politics in the context of Britain, Senegal and Ghana. It became a Sunday Times bestseller. Hirsch was awarded a Royal Society of Literature Jerwood Prize for Non-Fiction while writing it in 2016.

==== Decolonising My Body ====
Reviewing Hirsch's 2023 book, Decolonising My Body: A Radical Exploration of Rituals and Beauty, Niellah Arboine wrote in The Guardian: "If her first book Brit(ish) was about grappling with her identity as a black British woman of mixed heritage, Decolonising My Body aims to unpack how her identity and wider society have shaped her physically."

=== Television ===
Hirsch has been a panellist on the Sky News discussion programme The Pledge.

==== The Battle for Britain's Heroes ====
In the television programme The Battle for Britain's Heroes, first broadcast by Britain's Channel 4 in late May 2018, Hirsch raised lesser-known aspects of the career of former British prime minister Winston Churchill, such as his attitude to Indians and advocacy of tear gassing "uncivilised tribes" in Mesopotamia (now partly modern-day Iraq) after the First World War. In his review of the programme, Hugo Rifkind in The Times wrote that the "subtext is often that Hirsch is attacking Britain in even mentioning this stuff", which itself implies, because of her own background that it "is frankly uppity of her", but Hirsch does not let "her views be defined in opposition to those of her detractors".

==== Enslaved ====
Hirsch was co-presenter alongside Samuel L. Jackson of the six-part television documentary series Enslaved, premiered in 2020, which explores aspects of the history of the transatlantic slave trade, including links to her personal history.

==== African Renaissance: When Art Meets Power ====
In 2020, Hirsch presented the documentary series African Renaissance: When Art Meets Power on BBC Four. Hirsch visited Ethiopia, Senegal and Kenya, meeting musicians and artists, and recounting the history of each country.

In August 2021, it was announced Hirsch's production company Born in Me (its name references a quotation from Kwame Nkrumah: "I am not African because I was born in Africa, but because Africa was born in me") had signed a deal with Fremantle.

==== Africa Rising with Afua Hirsch ====
In June 2023, Hirsch presented the three-part BBC documentary series Africa Rising with Afua Hirsch exploring how young creatives are reinventing culture across Africa.

=== Teaching ===
Hirsch holds the Wallis Annenberg Chair in Journalism and Communication at the University of Southern California in Los Angeles.

== Recognition ==
Hirsch was on the panel of judges for the 2019 Booker Prize for Fiction that, causing much controversy, made Margaret Atwood and Bernardine Evaristo joint winners.

Later that year, Hirsch was included in the 2020 edition of the Powerlist of the most influential Britons from African/African-Caribbean heritage.

Hirsch was cited as one of the top 100 most influential Africans by New African magazine in 2020. Furthermore, in the Powerlist 2021, she made the top 10, ranking ninth most influential person of African or African Caribbean heritage in the United Kingdom.

In 2024, Hirsch was elected a Fellow of the Royal Society of Literature.

== Personal life ==
Hirsch met Sam, her partner, while each was pursuing a legal career. He is from Tottenham, North London, and of Ghanaian descent. The couple's daughter was born in 2011.

== Bibliography ==
=== Books ===
- Brit(ish): On Race, Identity and Belonging, London: Jonathan Cape, 2018, ISBN 9781911214281
- Equal to Everything: Judge Brenda and the Supreme Court (for children), Legal Action Group, 2019, ISBN 978 1 912273 48 5
- Decolonising My Body: A Radical Exploration of Rituals and Beauty, London: Penguin Books, October 2023, ISBN 9781529908664

=== Selected articles ===
- "What's It Like Being Black in Norway?". The Guardian, 26 May 2013
- "Britain: Rainbow Nation, Racist Background", Prospect, 16 March 2017
- "Toppling Statues? Here's Why Nelson's Column Should Be Next", The Guardian, 22 August 2017
- "The Fantasy of 'Free Speech'", Prospect, 16 February 2018
- "The Racism That Killed George Floyd Was Built in Britain". The Guardian, 3 June 2020
- "Afua Hirsch on the Crucial Black History Lessons All Schools Should Be Teaching". Vogue, 15 June 2020
- "'We Are Coming Towards A Great Reckoning': Lily Gladstone & Leonardo DiCaprio On Their Searing Period Drama, Killers of the Flower Moon", Vogue, October 2023
- "Kerry Washington on uncovering a family secret: 'It's exhausting to put on a mask to maintain appearances'", The Guardian, 14 October 2023.
- "'My year of adornment': how Afua Hirsch embraced turning 40", The Observer, 15 October 2023.
- "Afua Hirsch: How I faced the fear of getting older", i, 15 December 2023
- "'We are all mixed': Henry Louis Gates Jr on race, being arrested and working towards America's redemption", The Observer, 10 March 2024.
- "Slave Play's Jeremy O. Harris: 'Rishi calling me wrong and divisive is the funniest thing'", The Standard, 20 June 2024.
