= Bretton (name) =

Bretton is both a given name and surname. Notable people with the name include:

== Given name ==
- Bretton Byrd (1904–1959), British composer and musician
- Bretton Richardson, American college baseball coach and former player

== Surname ==
- Raphaël Bretton (1920–2011), French set decorator
- Sally Bretton (born 1980), British actress
- William Bretton (1909–1971), New Zealand clergy
