= Bretton Hall =

Bretton Hall may refer to:

- Bretton Hall, Flintshire, former fortified manor house on the England/Wales border
- Bretton Hall, West Yorkshire, country house in West Yorkshire, England
- Bretton Hall College, former teacher-training college in West Yorkshire, England
- Bretton Hall (Manhattan), hotel in New York City, United States
