= William Britton =

William Britton may refer to:

- William B. Britton (1829–1910), American politician
- W. H. Britton (William Hamilton Britton, 1892–1982), American football and basketball coach
- Bill Britton (born 1955), American golfer
- Bill Britton (Canadian football) (1934–2017), Canadian football player
- Bill Britton (athlete) (1890–1965), Irish athlete

== See also ==
- William Britton Baird
- William Britain (disambiguation)
- William Breton (disambiguation)
