= Izannah Walker =

American doll manufacturer and inventor (1817–1888)

Izannah Frankford Walker
- Born: September 25, 1817; Bristol, Rhode Island
- Died: February 15, 1888 (aged 70); Central Falls, Rhode Island
- Occupations: Doll manufacturer, inventor
- Parent(s): Gilbert Walker and Sarah (Sally) Swasey

Izannah Walker (1817–1888) was an American dollmaker and inventor from Central Falls, Rhode Island. She designed and manufactured dolls that have become collector's items. She received one of the earliest patents for doll construction, and was also a skilled carpenter, the designer of a parlor heater, and, according to historian Autumn Stanley, a "jill of all trades."

== Early life and family ==
Izannah Walker was born in Bristol, Rhode Island, on September 25, 1817, to Gilbert Walker and Sarah "Sally" Swasey. Her mother died in 1824 and her father in 1825. Walker may have lived with relatives in Somerset, Massachusetts, for some years; the 1850 census shows her there, living with her aunt, uncle, and sister. She moved to Central Falls, Rhode Island, by 1860, and is listed in the 1865 Rhode Island state census as a doll maker.

Her niece wrote this description of Walker: "Aunt Izannah always deplored the fact that she was not a man. However, she made dolls and doll furniture, tinkered with household gadgets, designed a parlor heater, that beat Ben Franklins,' raised canaries, dabbled in real estate, and was looked upon with admiration by male contemporaries because of her skill with carpenters' tools, so perhaps she was resigned."

Walker lived with her partner Emeline Whipple (born 1826) since at least 1870, when the US Census notes Whipple as a "doll maker" and Walker as "keeping house." Walker died on February 15, 1888. She and Whipple are buried together at Swan Point Cemetery in Providence, Rhode Island.

== Doll manufacturing ==
Walker began manufacturing dolls as early as the 1840s, as a family business. She was inventive from the start. Her niece remembered: "Family tradition tells of her struggle to perfect her work and of the long wrestling with one problem, how to obtain a resistant surface to the stockinette heads, arms, and legs, without racking or peeling. With this problem on her mind, Aunt Izannah suddenly sat up in bed one night to hear a voice say 'use paste.' It worked."

Walker was involved with every aspect of manufacture. According to her niece, "She used her own hand press and dies for the shaping of her dolls' heads and bodies; all of the little hands and feet were hand-sewn." Historian Autumn Stanley referred to Walker as a "jill of all trades."

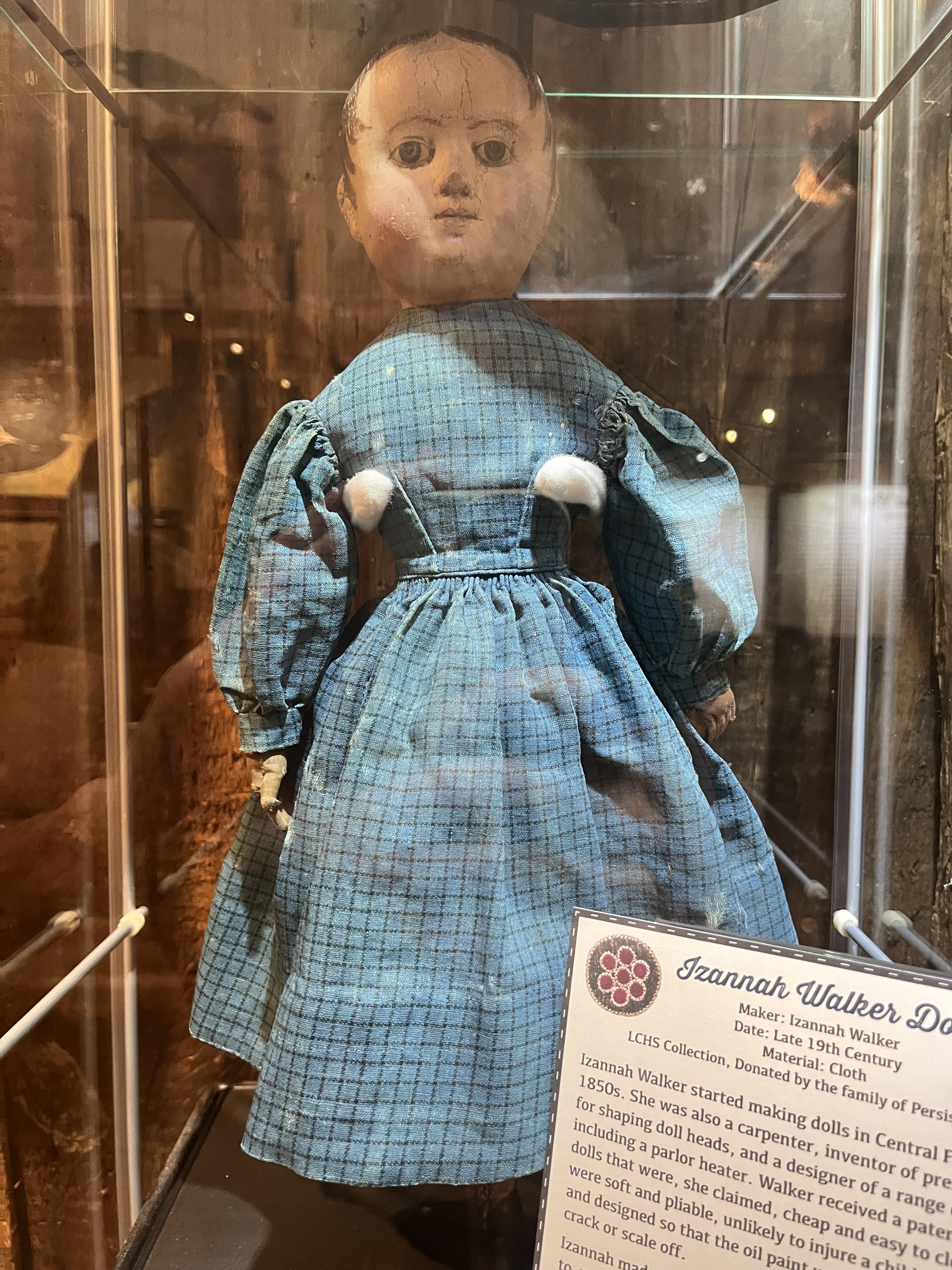
Izannah Walker doll on exhibit at the Little Compton Historical Society

Her mother was a dollmaker, and it is believed that Walker and her three sisters painted the doll faces. Walker's dolls represent children. They have, according to The Strong National Museum of Play, "distinctive and sweet doll faces that some folk-art specialists suggest resemble the primitive portraiture of 19th century New England artists."

It is not known how many dolls Walker created, or the size of her workshop. Kathy Duncan argues that she probably employed several people to make dolls, including her partner Emeline Whipple, and possibly her aunt and sister. She was, Duncan suggests, "running a small business of some consequence rather than a quaint little cottage industry." Walker's dolls were sold wholesale by E.W. Billings, who advertised them in the 1870s and 1880s in the Providence Evening Bulletin. In 1881, Billings noted that he had "a stock of Miss Walker's cloth dolls this season, their chief merit consisting in their ability to stand rough usage and abandonment serenely."

== Inventing ==
Walker applied for a patent for "a new and valuable Improvement in the manufacture of dolls" on June 12, 1873. She claimed novelty in "the secondary or double stuffing next the external or painted layer, whereby, with a sufficiently soft surface, the tendency of the paint to crack or scale off is obviated." She claimed that a doll manufactured using her patent "is inexpensive, easily kept clean, and not apt to injure a young child which may fall upon it. It will preserve its appearance for a long time, as the soft secondary stuffing under the stockinet or external webbing enables it to give under pressure, so that the oil paint will not scale off. At the same time the inner and more compact stutting prevents ordinary pressure from forcing the surface in to such an extent as to crack the paint." She received her patent, No. 144,373, on November 4, 1873.

Drawings from Isannah Walker patent US144373

The patent included a description of Walker's manufacturing process:

"In the construction of my doll I usually employ a press...of ordinary construction, provided with upper and lower dies, of suitable shape, to form the front and back of the face, neck, and chest, and sometimes the body of the doll. In the dies I place several thicknesses of cotton or other cheap cloth, treated with glue or paste, so that they will adhere together and hold the shape impressed upon them by the dies. When these cloth forms are dry a layer of cotton batting or other soft filling is carefully laid over them...and then, in tuern, covered with an external layer of stockinet or similar webbing. The latter is then fastened to the features of the cloth forms by stiches or paste, and they are then placed again in the press. After they are taken from the press the forms are filled with hair, cotton, or other stuffing, and a piece of wood having been centrally and longitudinally laid between the two for stiffening the outer webbing, they are tightly pressed together and secured by sewing, pasting or gluing the edges to each other. The finishing is then done by painting the face and other parts neatly with oil-paint."

== Recognition ==
Izannah Walker dolls are considered collector's items. One of the dolls sold at auction in 2022 for $62,000. Prices for other Walker dolls at the same auction ranged between $20,000 and $25,000.

The United States Postal Service included an Izannah Walker doll as one of the fifteen Classic American Dolls on a set of 32-cent stamps issued July 28, 1997, in Anaheim, California.
