= Brit =

Brit most commonly refers to:

- Briton, a British person
- Brit milah, Jewish circumcision

Brit, Brits or BRIT may also refer to:

== People ==
=== Nicknames ===
- Brit Hume (born 1943), American TV journalist
- Brit Selby (born 1945), Canadian ice-hockey player
- Brit Smith (born 1985), American actress, model, singer, and songwriter

=== Given names ===
- Brit Andresen, Norwegian-born Australian architect
- Brit Bildøen (born 1962), Norwegian poet, novelist, essayist, children's writer and literary critic
- Brit Hoel (born 1942), Norwegian politician
- Brit Marling (born 1982), American writer, producer, director and actress
- Brit McRoberts (born 1957), Canadian retired middle-distance runner
- Brit Morgan (born 1987), American film and television actress
- Brit Pettersen (born 1961), Norwegian former cross-country skier
- Brit Sandaune (born 1972), Norwegian soccer player and pre-school teacher
- Brit Solli (born 1959), Norwegian archaeologist
- Brit Stakston (born 1961), Swedish-Norwegian writer, public speaker and media strategist
- Brit Volden (born 1960), Norwegian orienteering competitor

=== Family names ===
- Cri-Zelda Brits (born 1983), South African cricketer
- Danie Brits, South African former professional wrestler
- Gorka Brit (born 1978), Spanish footballer
- Grant Brits (born 1987), Australian freestyle swimmer
- Okkert Brits (born 1973), South African former pole vaulter
- Schalk Brits (born 1981), South African rugby union footballer
- Stefan Brits (born 1992), South African track and field athlete
- Tazmin Brits (born 1991), South African cricketer and former javelin thrower
- Walter Brit (fl. 1390), a fellow of Merton College, Oxford, and the reputed author of works on astronomy and mathematics, as well as a treatise on surgery

== Places ==
- Brits, North West, a town in the North West province of South Africa, near Pretoria
- River Brit, a river in Dorset, England
- Britstown, a small farming town in the Northern Cape of South Africa

== Organizations ==
- Botanical Research Institute of Texas, a global botanical research institute and learning center in the U.S.
- Board of Radiation and Isotope Technology, a unit of the Department of Atomic Energy in Navi Mumbai, India
- Brit + Co., an online DIY community/e-commerce company based in San Francisco
- Brit plc, an international general insurance and reinsurance group acquired by Fairfax Financial in May 2015
- BRIT School for Performing Arts and Technology, a British performing arts and technology school in the London Borough of Croydon

== Other uses ==
- The Brit Awards, the British Phonographic Industry's annual pop music awards
- Bedford Road Invitational Tournament, a basketball tournament held in Saskatoon, Saskatchewan, Canada
- Berith (disambiguation), Hebrew for "covenant"
- Brit (character), an Image Comics superhero and series
- Brit Stevenson, a character in the film Saw V portrayed by Julie Benz

== See also ==
- Britney (disambiguation)
- Britt (disambiguation)
- Briton (disambiguation)
- British (disambiguation)
