= Bretten (disambiguation) =

Bretten may refer to:

- Bretten, a town in the state of Baden-Württemberg, Germany
- Bretten station, a rail transport in the town of Bretten in the German state of Baden-Württemberg
- Bretten, Haut-Rhin, a commune in the Haut-Rhin department in Alsace in north-eastern France
