= Walter Brit =

14th-century author

Walter Brit (alternatively Brit, Brytte, or Brithus) (fl. 1390), was a fellow of Merton College, Oxford, and the reputed author of several works on astronomy and mathematics, as well as a treatise on surgery. He has also been described as a follower of John Wycliffe, and as author of a book, De auferendis clero possessionibus.

== Lollard identification issue ==
In the 17th century, Anthony Wood identified Brit with Walter Brut, a layman of the diocese of Hereford, whose trial before Bishop Thomas Trevenant of Hereford in 1391 is related by John Foxe. Current scholarship regards the matter as still open, however.

Foxe prints the articles of heresy with which Brut was charged, the speech in which he defended himself, and his ultimate submission of his opinions to the determination of the church. Thirty-seven articles were then drawn up and sent to the University of Cambridge to be confuted. Brut, however, appears to have escaped further molestation.

== Attribution of scientific writings ==
The work most frequently cited as Brit's is the Theorica Planetarum, which bears his name in two manuscripts in the Bodleian Library (Digby, xv. ff. 58 b-92, and Wood, 8 d, f. 93); it has also been claimed for Simon Bredon. Pederson considers it as Brit's.

The work in question, which begins with the words: Circulus ecentricus, circulus egresse cuspidis, et circulus egredientis centri idem sunt, is further to be distinguished from another treatise with the same title, of which the opening words are Circulus ecentricus, vel egresse cuspidis, vel egredientis centri, dicitur, and of which the authorship is shown by the notices collected by Baldassarre Boncompagni ( in Della Vita e delle Opere di Gherardo Cremonese e di Gherardo di Sabbionetta) to be really due to the younger Gerard of Cremona (Gerardus de Sabloneto) in the thirteenth century. The latter has been repeatedly confounded with the Theorica indifferently assigned by the bibliographers to Brit and Bredon.

Another treatise mentioned by John Bale as the composition of Brit is the Theoremata Planetarum, which Thomas Tanner cites as that existing in the Digby MS. exc. f. 190 b (now f. 169 b). This manuscript dates from about the year 1300, and the work is by Johannes de Sacrobosco.

Finally, the Cirurgia Walteri Brit named in the ancient table of contents in another Digby MS. (xcviii. f. 1 b) has nothing corresponding to it in the volume itself but a set of English medical receipts whose author is not stated (f. 257).

== Notes ==
This article incorporates text from a publication now in the public domain: "Brit, Walter". Dictionary of National Biography. London: Smith, Elder & Co. 1885–1900.
