= Britain, Virginia =

Unincorporated community in Virginia, United States

- Unincorporated community
- Location within Virginia Location within the United States
- Coordinates: 39°15′10″N 77°41′49″W
- Country: United States
- State: Virginia
- County: Loudoun
- Time zone: UTC−5 (Eastern (EST))
  - Summer (DST): UTC−4 (EDT)

Britain is an unincorporated community village in Loudoun County, Virginia, United States lying along Milltown Creek. It is located on the eastern flanks of Short Hill Mountain along Mountain Road (VA Route 690) at its junction with Britain Road. The area was the site of a growing African American community in the mid to late 19th century, before most of the residents left for Maryland in the 1920s.

== History ==
Originally known as Guinea, the village of Britain—named after Michigan senator Calvin Britain—became the place of settlement for a free African American community in the mid 19th century. Mount Sinai Free Baptist Church was established here in 1883 and served as a public school and gathering place for the community, until services ended in the 1920s. Unlike most of the black settlements in Loudoun County, Britain had a post office in operation. Its African American residents began to move elsewhere in the early 19th century with the last black families leaving Britain in the 1920s.
