= Brenton (disambiguation) =

Brenton is a name.

Brenton may also refer to:

- Brenton, Nova Scotia
- Brenton, West Virginia
- Brenton, a serif modern typeface.
