= Nora Bretón =

Mexican physicist

Nora Eva Bretón Báez is a Mexican physicist whose research involves charged black holes. She is a researcher at CINVESTAV, the Center for Research and Advanced Studies of the National Polytechnic Institute.

== Education and career ==
Bretón is originally from Puebla, where she did her high school and undergraduate studies. She earned a master's degree in physics from CINVESTAV in 1982, and completed her Ph.D. there in 1986.

Meanwhile, she took a part-time assistant professorship at UAM Azcapotzalco from 1983 to 1985. After completing her doctorate, she became a researcher at the Meritorious Autonomous University of Puebla from 1986 to 1989, before returning to CINVESTAV as a researcher in 1989. She also did postdoctoral research at the University of the Basque Country from 1990 to 1992.

== Recognition ==
Bretón is a member of the Mexican Academy of Sciences, elected in 1990. She led the Division of Gravitation and Mathematical Physics of the Mexican Physical Society from 2001 to 2003.
