= Briton Motor Company =

Former car manufacturer

The Briton Motor Company was a Wolverhampton-based car manufacturer that produced cars from 1909 to 1919 then from 1922 to 1929. The company produced a number of models ranging from 7 to 16 horsepower and played an important role in the Wolverhampton motor industry.

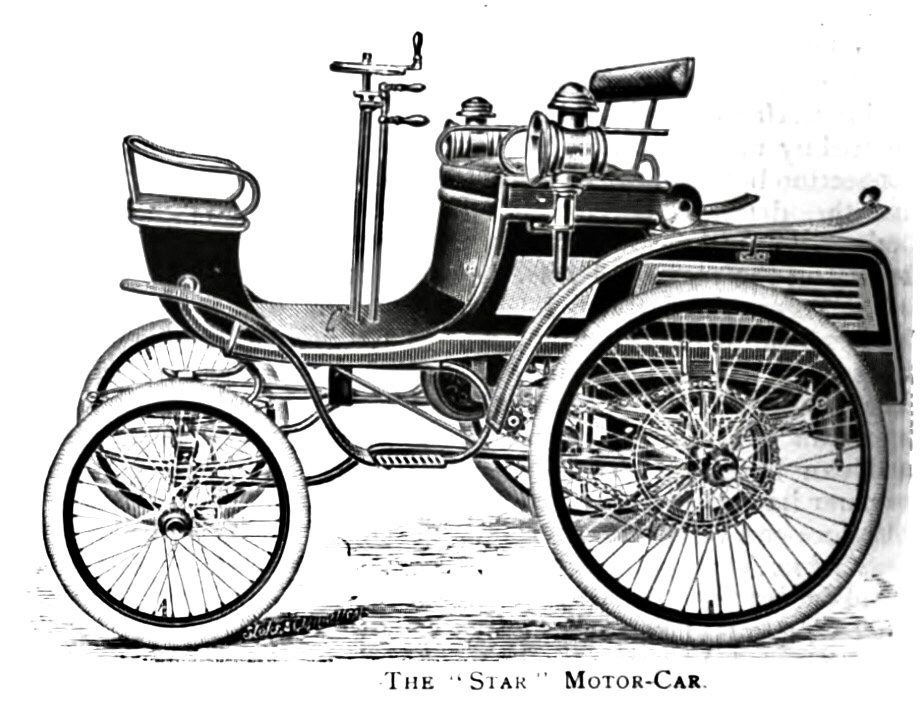
Star motor car (1899)

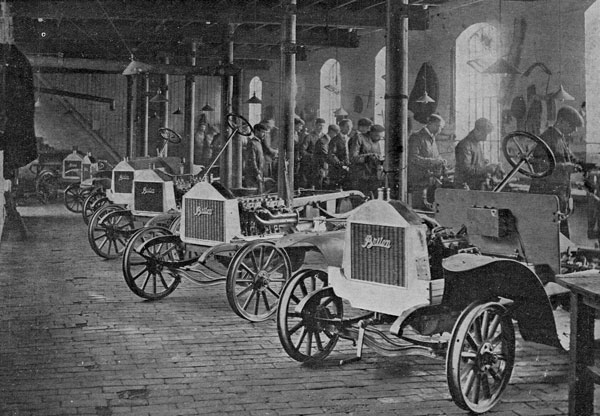
An inside view of the Briton Motor Factory in 1911

== History ==
=== Foundation ===
The Briton Motor Company was formed in 1909 after the Star Engineering Company took over the Star Cycle Company and manufacture of the 'Starling' and 'Stuart' cars was ended. They were replaced by Briton cars produced by the Briton Car Company, managed by Edward Lisle Junior, son of Star's founder. Briton continued to work out of Star's Stewart Street Works using the same workforce as had been there previously. The first model produced was the two-cylinder, 7 hp, 'Little Briton' which sold for 175 guineas, increasing to 10 and 12 hp. These were followed by four-cylinder models ranging from 12 to 16 hp.

In 1912 the Briton Motor Company (1912) Limited was formed and moved to a new site on lower Walsall street, previously occupied by Shrubbery Iron Works, in 1913. The company took part in many trials across 1912–1913, winning gold and silver medals in the trials at Brooklands, Saltburn and Manchester.

=== The First World War ===
Car production continued during the war although Briton did contribute to the war effort by making shell cases. The company also became UK agent for the American Scripps-Booth car, but the venture failed. 1914 and 1915 saw the introduction of new two- and four-seater models with a new deluxe chassis.

In 1917 and 18 only small commercial vehicles and ambulances were produced. However, the company found itself in trouble with the government for failing to meet its contractual obligations. The government demanded compensation which resulted in a call for shares of £50,000.

=== The end of the company ===
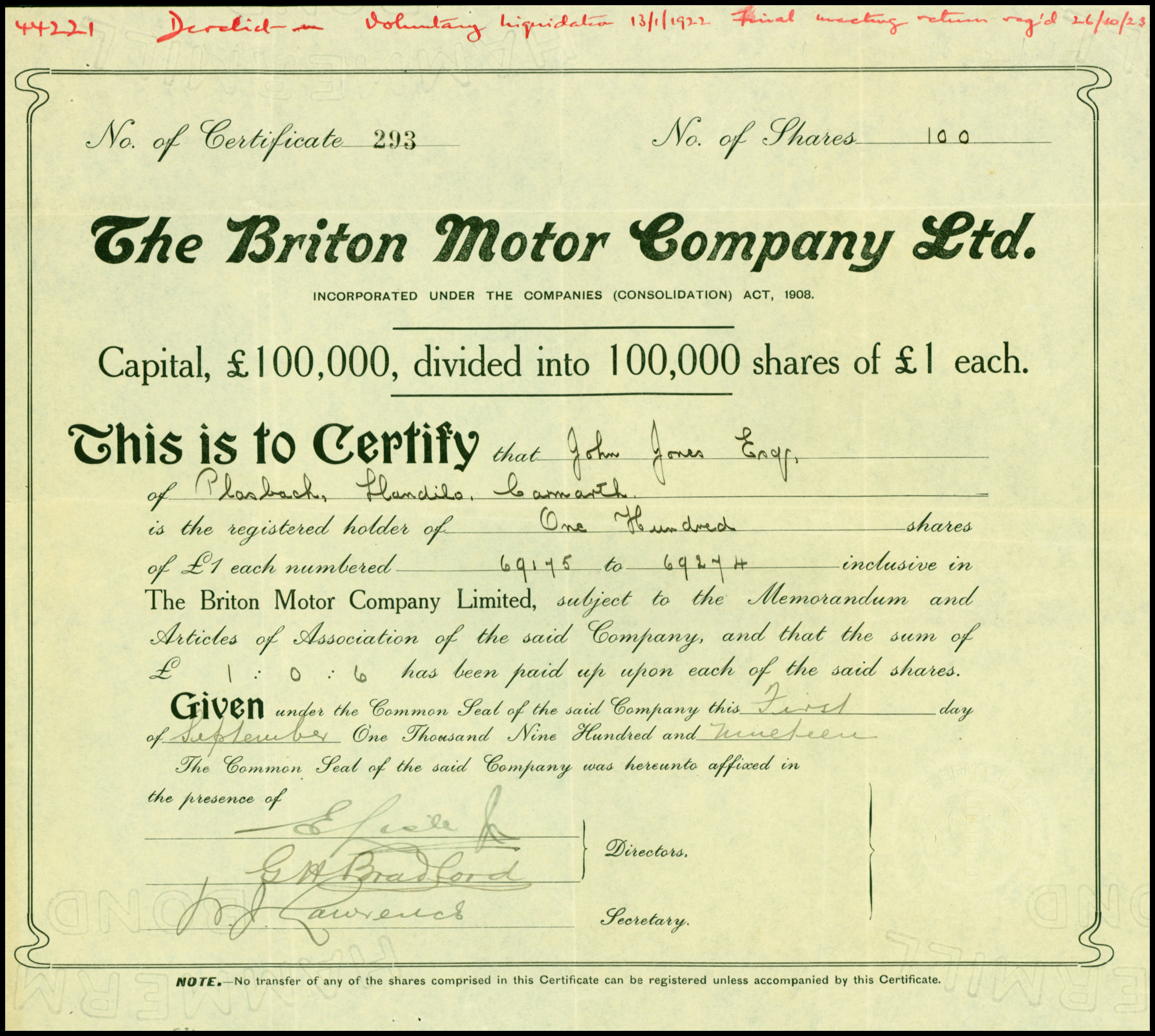
Share of the Briton Motor Company Ltd., issued 1. September 1919

Production resumed in 1919 with the release of 10/12 hp. car, powered by a four-cylinder engine which sold for 420 guineas. They produced 106 of this model, along with 549 of the 14/16 hp cars. The company was able to raise £50,000 through the sale of shares, and in 1920 three new models were designed, including a Chapuis Dornier-engined sports car although none ever went into production.

Briton produced 170 cars during 1920, 163 of the 10/12 hp. model and 7 of the 10 hp. model. However, the car industry was changing as companies such as Austin and Morris adopted mass-production techniques, meaning they were able to produce and sell cars at a cost that Briton could not match, putting the company in deep financial trouble.

In December 1920 the Midland Bank took £50,000 worth of Briton's stock as repayment of debts owed to them, and the company produced only 65 cars in 1921. In December 1921 the bank appointed receivers for the company, and a month later the company entered liquidation, assessed at a value of £30,500. Britons's works were sold to fellow Wolverhampton company AJS in October 1923 for £7,000.

The Briton Motor Company name was carried on by Charles A. Weight, who took over what remained of the company. Weight moved the machine shop and components that had been left behind to a new site at Chillington Fields, also taking on a number of Briton's old workforce. Car production continued on this site until 1929, when production costs became too great, with around 600 cars having been made in total. The Briton Motor Company continued, becoming Tractor Spares Limited in 1940, a company which still exists today.

On Monday 5 December 2022, a fire broke out on the site of the factory in Horseley Fields Wolverhampton. 100 firefighters attended, two helicopters and numerous police as the site is adjacent to the Wolverhampton Station trainline and in close proximity to the train station. There was also a threat of further damage and potential explosions due to the sites proximity to the British Oxygen Company (BOC) which stores pressurised gases in cylinders. The incident was therefore declared a major incident. The Willenhall Road in Horseley Fields at the rear of the site, which is a major route out of Wolverhampton leading to J10 of the M6 motor, was closed due to damage to the bridge wall under the train track. The cause of the fire is under investigation.

== Car models ==
Year of release	Specifications	Features	Price
1909	7/10 hp. 2-cylinder	2-seater	175 Guineas
1910	12/14/16 hp. 4-cylinder	2-seater	200 Guineas
1912	10/12 hp. 4-cylinder car	2-seater streamlined body	235 Guineas
1912	10/12 hp. 4-cylinder car	4-seater streamlined body	255 Guineas
1912	10/12 hp. 4-cylinder special car	2-seater streamlined body	175 Guineas
1912	14/16 hp. 4-cylinder special car	2-seater streamlined body	200 Guineas
1912	14/16 hp. 4-cylinder special car	4-seater streamlined body	220 Guineas
1912	14/16 hp. 4-cylinder car	2-seater streamlined body	310 Guineas
1912	14/16 hp. 4-cylinder car	4-seater streamlined body	350 Guineas
1913	10/12 hp., 4-cylinder, 68 mm bore x 120 mm stroke, 1,743 cc at 1,000 rpm	Standard chassis, pointed radiator	190 guineas
1913	10/12 hp., 4-cylinder, 68 mm bore x 120 mm stroke, 1,743 cc at 1,000 rpm	2-seater	235 guineas
1913	10/12 hp., 4-cylinder, 68 mm bore x 120 mm stroke, 1,743 cc at 1,000 rpm	4-seater	255 guineas
1913	10/12 hp., 4-cylinder, 68 mm bore x 120 mm stroke, 1,743 cc at 1,000 rpm	Special chassis, flat radiator	160 guineas
1913	10/12 hp., 4-cylinder, 68 mm bore x 120 mm stroke, 1,743 cc at 1,000 rpm	2-seater	175 guineas
1913	10/12 hp., 4-cylinder, 68 mm bore x 120 mm stroke, 1,743 cc at 1,000 rpm	4-seater	200 guineas
1913	14/16 hp., 4-cylinder, 80 mm bore x 120 mm stroke, 2,412 cc at 1,000 rpm	Standard chassis, flat radiator	225 guineas
1913	14/16 hp., 4-cylinder, 80 mm bore x 120 mm stroke, 2,412 cc at 1,000 rpm	2-seater	310 guineas
1913	14/16 hp., 4-cylinder, 80 mm bore x 120 mm stroke, 2,412 cc at 1,000 rpm	4-seater	350 guineas
1913	14/16 hp., 4-cylinder, 80 mm bore x 120 mm stroke, 2,412 cc at 1,000 rpm	Special chassis, pointed radiator	180 guineas
1913	14/16 hp., 4-cylinder, 80 mm bore x 120 mm stroke, 2,412 cc at 1,000 rpm	2-seater	200 guineas
1913	14/16 hp., 4-cylinder, 80 mm bore x 120 mm stroke, 2,412 cc at 1,000 rpm	4-seater	220 guineas
1914	14/16 hp., 4-cylinder	2-seater Special Car	200 guineas
1914	14/16 hp., 4-cylinder	4-seater Special Car	220 guineas
1915	10/12 hp., 4-cylinder	Wide 2-seater	190 guineas
1915	10/12 hp., 4-cylinder	Roomy 4-seater	215 guineas
1915	14/16 hp., 4-cylinder	2-seater plus dickey De Luxe car	330 guineas
1915	14/16 hp., 4-cylinder	4-seater De Luxe car	370 guineas
1919	10/12 hp., 4-cylinder, 1,375 cc engine, 63 mm bore, 110 mm stroke	4-seater	420 guineas
