= Bretton Woods twins =

Pair of international financial institutions, the IMF and World Bank

The Bretton Woods twins refers to the two multilateral organizations created at the Bretton Woods Conference in 1944, namely the World Bank and the International Monetary Fund. Both twin organizations functioned to enact and maintain the Bretton Woods system of prescribed international currency exchange rates.
