= Didier Breton =

British businessman

Didier Breton (born 1953) was the chief operating officer of Trader Classified Media, one of the world's largest classified advertising companies., division president for infrastructure and systems at Groupe Bull, and an executive at Hewlett-Packard and Valeo. Since 2006 he has been associated with Pamoja Capital, an investment firm.
