= Bretton Hall, Flintshire =

Manor house in Flintshire, Wales

Coordinates: 53.1678°N 2.9505°W

Bretton Hall is located on the border of England and Wales close to the village of Bretton, Flintshire, Wales. The original fortified manor house was surrounded by a moat, it was replaced by a brick built house adjacent to the original site in the 18th century. The moat and foundations of the original house remain.

The earliest references to Bretton Hall refer to a marriage between Isobel, daughter of Ralph Holland of Bretton and Hugh de Ravenscroft of Cheshire in the 15th century.
