= Micky Bretón =

Dominican Republic film director (1960–2009)

- Born: October 24, 1960
- Died: November 1, 2009 (aged 49)
- Other names: Juan Miguel Bretón Mieses
- Occupations: director, writer, and producer
- Known for: TV series “Relatos de Micky Bretón”

Juan Miguel Bretón Mieses (24 October 1960 - 1 November 2009) also known as Micky Bretón was a Dominican director, writer, and producer best known for his TV series “Relatos de Micky Bretón” that aired in the Dominican Republic.

== Biography ==
Bretón began his career in the children's area "La casa de Pequita", driving Anita Ontiveros in the mid-1970s. He played a character named Trigolitos.

At the end of 1979, Bretón worked as editor of the newly opened Teleantillas, channel 2, traveling the following year to study a bachelor's degree on Television at the Complutense University of Madrid, Spain. While he was in Spain, he worked in Televisión Española as producer of videos.

Upon his return in 1995, Bretón took over as director of the program "Nuria en el 9", who coincidentally had worked in "La casa de Pequita". Then, also by Nuria Piera (la voz del pueblo), he wrote and directed "Al filo de la vida", in which starts the dramatized stories that catapulted him.

Since 2004 until his death in 2009, Bretón created, produced, wrote and directed "Relatos de Micky Bretón", after being a producer of several programs, including "Nadie es perfecto" and "Noche de luz".

== Death ==
Breton was murdered in a motel (cabaña) on November 1, 2009, in the Dominican Republic.
