= Brit(ish) =

2018 book by Afua Hirsch

Brit(ish): On Race, Identity and Belonging
- Front cover
- Author: Afua Hirsch
- Subject: Autobiography, politics, history
- Publisher: Vintage Publishing
- Publication date: 1 February 2018
- Pages: 384
- ISBN: 9781784705039

Brit(ish): On Race, Identity and Belonging is a 2018 book by the journalist Afua Hirsch. The book is part-memoir and discusses black history, culture and politics in the context of Britain, Senegal and Ghana. It received mixed critical reception.

== Synopsis ==
Hirsch grew up in Wimbledon, London, the daughter of a white British father and a black Ghanaian mother who had emigrated to Britain. Hirsch describes them as working hard to provide her with a middle-class upbringing. She was privately educated. Her classmates and the characters she saw in fiction were predominantly white. Hirsch writes that though people around her claimed not to notice race, she was treated differently because of her race, such as security guards at shops scrutinising her more, and thus was taught that "being black is bad". Hirsch attended the University of Oxford, where she felt alien because of her race. As a young adult, she worked in Senegal. She became a barrister and then a journalist.

Hirsch writes about the Black Lives Matter movement and criticizes the frequency with which law enforcement kills black men. Hirsch objects to the United Kingdom policy of "stop and search", finding it overly harassing of black men. She recounts incidents from her journalism career relating to race, such as meeting with far-right English Defence League members and attending a club in which white men watched as their white partners had sex with black men.

The book also describes the history of slavery in Britain and its colonisation of Ghana.

== Reception ==
According to The Bookseller, the book had sold 36,000 copies by October 2020.

Martina Evans in The Irish Times wrote that the book "teems with fascinating and uplifting as well as tragic stories". Evans praised its "dense, eye-opening" chapter on British and Ghanaian history and "writing that really shines" in its description of both countries. Bernardine Evaristo in The Times Literary Supplement wrote that Brit(ish) is "a free-flowing book of ideas, experiences and analysis that reach far beyond the personal. The past and present are in conversation with each other as Hirsch interrogates the roots of racism and dismantles myths." Colin Grant's review in The Guardian concluded: "The power of her writing matches that of other important black writers". Nikesh Shukla in The Observer praised the book as "warm, informative and occasionally heart-wrenching". Shukla believed it was "a countrywide conversation-starter" and "a deeply personal look at who she always knew she was, but didn’t feel ready to say yet".

David Goodhart in the London Evening Standard wrote that there was an "interesting book struggling to get out" but argued that "Hirsch's fluid definition of racism encourages victim status among minorities". Goodhart criticized a near-lack of "acknowledgement of progress" and that Hirsch "offers no answers except that white people need to check their privilege more", but found that there is "plenty to agree with in her critique of the evasions and embarrassments over race in Britain". Kwasi Kwarteng in The Sunday Times summarized that "despite the persuasive arguments, Hirsch overplays the idea that Britain is a racist, dystopian nightmare."
