= HMS Briton =

The following ships of the Royal Navy have been named HMS Briton:

- HMS Briton (1812), a fifth rate 38 launched at Chatham 11 April 1812, 17 September 1814 sailed to Pitcairn Island, convict ship 1841, target February 1850, and broken up September 1860. 1060 tons burthen (bm).
- HMS Briton (1869), a wooden screw corvette launched at Sheerness 11 June 1869, sold at Bombay 1887. 1,331 tons (bm); 1,860 tons.
- HMS Brilliant (1860), a fifth rate 36 launched at Deptford 28 December 1814, training ship 1859, renamed HMS Briton 8 November 1889, sold 12 May 1908. 964 tons (bm).
- HMS Calypso (1883), a steam and sail corvette launched at Chatham 7 June 1883, took the name HMS Briton 15 February 1916, sold 7 April 1922. Hull still extant.
