= William Britain =

William Britain may refer to:

- William Britain Jr., founder of the British toy company, W. Britain
- Bill Brittain (1930–2011), American author
- William Britten (1848–1916), British artist

== See also ==
- William Britton (disambiguation)
- William Breton (disambiguation)
