= William Briton =

French theologian

- Died: 1356; Grimsby, England
- Notable work: Vocabularium Bibliæ
- Theological work
- Main interests: Dialectics

William Briton or Breton (died 1356) was a Breton Franciscan theologian. John Bale places his death in 1356 at Grimsby.

== Works ==
Briton's works, enumerated by Bale, are principally concerned with dialectics. He is remembered, however, for his Vocabularium Bibliæ, a treatise explanatory of obscure words in the Scriptures. The prologue and some other components are in Latin verse. These, with supplemental specimens, were printed by Angelo Maria Bandini. Extracts are given by Ducange.
