= Autumn Stanley =

American patent historian (1933–2018)

- Born: December 21, 1933; Jackson, Ohio
- Died: September 20, 2018 (aged 84); Portola Valley, California
- Occupations: Researcher, scholar
- Partner: David A. Brewer

Academic background
- Education: Transylvania College; Stanford University
- Alma mater: Stanford University

Academic work
- Institutions: Stanford University Press, Pacific Lutheran College, Cañada College
- Main interests: Women as inventors
- Notable works: Mothers and Daughters of Invention

Autumn Stanley (1933–2018) researched inventions by women and patents obtained by women in the United States. She is widely known for her book titled, Mothers and Daughters of Invention.

== Early life and education ==
Autumn Joy Stanley was born in Vinton County, Ohio, on December 21, 1933. She attended Transylvania College (now Transylvania University) and graduated in 1955 with a bachelor's degree. She then pursued a master's degree in English and American Literature from Stanford University, which she received in 1967.

== Career ==
Stanley began her immediate post college working at Stanford University Press as an editor of scholarly books from 1969 to 1974. She then worked at Wadsworth Publishing Company developing science textbooks from 1974 to 1980. She taught at Pacific Lutheran College in the 1957–1958 term, and at Cañada College in 1969–1970. From 1984 to 1988 she was an affiliated scholar of the Institute for Research on Women and Gender at Stanford University.

== Women inventors ==
Stanley is best known for her studies of women inventors and her book on that topic: Mothers and Daughters of Invention. The book covers the history of inventions by women from ancient times to the beginning of the 20th century. In the book she demonstrates that there were many inventions by women although these inventors are not included in most histories of science and technology. Among the inventions were safety mechanisms, such as the gravity-safety elevator which secured the elevator shaft so that one could not fall into it, a fire escape, and an anti-derailment device for railroad trains. For one aspect of her study she made use of a document compiled by the US Patent Office in 1888 that was a list of patents obtained by women, covering the years 1790–1888. She discovered that the list was inaccurate, yet the information needed to create an accurate count of women's patents was also not available. She undertook the study of all patents in 1876 in the USPTO files in an attempt to clarify the discrepancies and discovered patentees with presumably female names but that were not included in the USPTO report. She concluded, based on her sample, that the list of over 5,500 women was lacking possibly as many as 1,500 entries.

== Writings in women's studies (selected) ==
- Mothers and daughters of invention: Notes for a revised history of technology. Rutgers University Press, 1995. ISBN 9780813521978
- "Daughters of Isis, daughters of Demeter: When women sowed and reaped." Women's Studies International Quarterly, 1981, 4(3), 289–304.
- "Once and future power: Women as inventors." In: Women's Studies International Forum, Vol. 15, No. 2, pp. 193–203, January, 1992.
- Raising More Hell and Fewer Dahlias: The Public Life of Charlotte Smith, 1840-1917. Lehigh University Press, 2009. ISBN 9780934223997
- “The Champion of Women Inventors.” American Heritage of Invention & Technology 8, no. 1, Summer 1992, pp22–26.
- “The Patent Office Clerk as Conjurer: The Vanishing Lady Trick in a Nineteenth-Century Historical Source,” in Women, Work, and Technology: Transformations, edited by Barbara Drygulski Wright et al. Ann Arbor: University of Michigan Press, 1987: 118–136. ISBN 9780472063734
- Hopkins, Patrick D, Autumn Stanley, Ruth S. Cowan, Michèle Martin, and Virginia Scharff. Sex/machine: Readings in Culture, Gender, and Technology. Bloomington: Indiana University, 1998. ISBN 9780253334411
- Stanley, Autumn (1992). "Scribbling Women as Entrepreneurs: Kate Field (1838-96) and Charlotte Smith (1840-1917)". Business and Economic History: 74–83.
- Stanley, Autumn (1982). "Charlotte Smith". Tulsa Studies in Women's Literature. 1 (1): 86. doi:10.2307/464095. JSTOR 464095.

== Other books ==
Stanley also wrote books for children, working with various illustrators.

- Marcie's daffodil. illustrated by Ji Young Lee. Bloomington, Indiana: Xlibris Corporation. 2010. ISBN 9781453575772.
- Mainder the buttercup. illustrated by Ceevah Freedman. Palo Alto, California: Oldstyle. 1977.
- The enchanted quill. illustrated by B. A. Tomkins. No Dead Lines. 1978.

Her other interest was cooking, and she wrote cookbooks.

- Asparagus: The Sparrowgrass Cookbook. Seattle: Pacific Search Press, 1977.

== Personal life ==
Stanley had four children. Her long-term companion preceded her in death. Stanley died in 2018 on September 20.
