= William Bretton =

New Zealand dean (1909–1971)

William Frederick Bretton (2 May 1909 – 4 November 1971) was the Dean of Nelson from 1957 until 1970.

Bretton was educated at Downing College, Cambridge and ordained in 1935. His first posts were curacies in Watford and Sparkhill. He was Vicar of St Cuthbert Birmingham from 1939 to 1942, and then St John the Evangelist, Sandown. Moving to New Zealand he held incumbencies in Johnsonville and Lower Hutt before his appointment as Dean.

In 1953, Bretton was awarded the Queen Elizabeth II Coronation Medal.
