= André Breton (singer) =

Canadian singer (1934–1992)

- Born: July 1, 1934; Sherbrooke, Quebec
- Died: September 18, 1992 (aged 58)
- Occupations: singer, animator and actor

André Breton (July 1, 1934 – September 18, 1992) was a Quebec-born singer, animator and actor.

== Biography ==
Breton was born in Sherbrooke, Quebec on July 1, 1934. His father was a barber and director of the choir of the parish. André got interested to songs from a very young age. He said himself: "I learned to sing before learning to speak".

In 1956, Breton played in an amateur theatre group in Sherbrooke, under the direction of Lionel Racine. At the beginning of the 60s, he began his career on radio CHLT and TV 7 and quickly became a success as a singer, host, and comedian. Together with two of his cousins, he formed the trio "Le Trio Chansonnette". Their only record sold 2000 copies in just one week.

In November 1964, Breton arrived at CKVL in Verdun, Quebec where he became the house announcer for 30 years. At that time, he hosted various variety shows on Sherbrooke television.

In 1966, at the 10th Anniversary Gala of Sherbrooke Television, Breton was nominated as "the most popular animator", the "most popular character" for Ti-Toine and Little Lulu, the "best singer" and the "best music show".

In 1967, Breton and René Ouellette hosted the program La grange à Trefflé. In 1969, after he released two singles, Breton recorded his first country music album in 1969. He also made several tours throughout Quebec with Marcel Martel, Willie Lamothe, and Lévis Bouliane.

In 1986, Breton received the Félix Award for his album One Day at a Time.

== Death ==
On September 18, 1992, Breton died from a heart attack.
