= Brittain =

Brittain may refer to:

- Brittain, West Virginia, United States
- Brittain, Ohio, United States
- Brittain Creek, a stream in North Carolina
- Brittain Dining Hall
- Brittain Speaker, a historical name for the Leslie speaker

== People ==
- Brittain (surname)
- Brittain Alexander, Member group Insight 23
- Brittain Ashford, American actress
- Brittain Brown (born 1997), American professional football player
- Brittain Gottlieb (born 2003), American professional soccer player

== See also ==
- Brittian, a township in Hettinger County, North Dakota
- Britain (disambiguation)
- Britten (disambiguation)
- Brittin
