= Consolea testudinis-crus =

Scientific classification
- Kingdom: Plantae
- Clade: Tracheophytes
- Clade: Angiosperms
- Clade: Eudicots
- Order: Caryophyllales
- Family: Cactaceae
- Genus: Consolea
- Species: C. testudinis-crus

Binomial name
- Consolea testudinis-crus (F.A.C.Weber) Mottram & Hoxey

Synonyms
- Opuntia haitiensis Britton; Opuntia testudinis-crus F.A.C.Weber (basionym)

Species of plant

Consolea testudinis-crus, commonly known in the Dominican Republic as alpargata, is a species of succulent flowering plant in the genus Consolea, within the family Cactaceae. It is endemic to the island of Hispaniola.

== Description ==
Consolea testudinis-crus is a species of cactus with a treelike growth form and a highly-branched crown. It may grow to 3-4 m in height. It forms an erect, non-articulated trunk, which is very spiny and grows to more than 2 m in height. It is cylindrical in cross-section and woody inside, and is covered in thick white and blackish wool. From the trunk grow flattened, segmented branches called cladodes that grow up to 30 cm in length and 15 cm in width. Their surfaces are covered in small protuberances which form a reticulate pattern, giving them a rough appearance.

Cladodes

On the trunk are areoles with glochids and short bristly spines; these are often lost with age.

The flowers are bright yellow in color, and may turn reddish over time. They open during the day and have curved bracts. The flowers develop on the upper parts of the uppermost stems. They measure up to 5 cm in length and 2.5 cm in diameter. In the center of the flower, there are many yellow stamens with anthers of the same color.

The fruits are egg-shaped with small spines that are green at first and turn yellowish with age. They have a bitter flavor and contain rough seeds. Although this species is very similar to Consolea moniliformis, it does not fruit as prolifically, and the fruits do not grow roots when they fall to the ground.

== Distribution and habitat ==
This species is native to the lowland dry forests of Hispaniola.

It is often found together with Consolea moniliformis. The flowers and fruits of both species provide an important food source for the rhinoceros and Ricord's iguanas that are endemic to the island (the latter of which is only found in the southern part of the island).

== Taxonomy ==
Consolea testudinis-crus was first described as Opuntia testudinis-crus, a name published in 1904 by the French botanist Frédéric Albert Constantin Weber in the scientific journal Bulletin du Muséum d'Histoire Naturelle 10: 389.

Later, the British botanists Roy Mottram and Paul Hoxey transferred the species to the genus Consolea, renaming it Consolea testudinis-crus. They registered these changes in the scientific journal Cactician 13: 73, published in 2020.

Etymology

- Consolea: the genus name honors the Italian botanist Michelangelo Console (1812–1897), professor of botany at the Orto Botanico di Palermo.
- testudinis-crus: the specific epithet is derived from the Latin words testudinis (meaning "turtle") and crus (meaning "leg" or "paw"), referencing the similarity of the stems of this species to the front limbs of a sea turtle.

== Cultivation ==
This species is cultivated mainly as an ornamental. It may be propagated vegetatively via cuttings, or via seed. Cattle often consume the cladodes (round, flattened stem segments).
