= Britton (surname) =

Britton is a surname. Notable people with the surname include:

- Andrew Britton (1981–2008), British-born American author
- Arthur Britton (1888–1919), British soldier
- Barbara Britton (1919–1980), American film and television actress
- Ben Britton (born 1985), British scientist
- Buck Britton (born 1986), American baseball coach
- Cameron Britton (born 1986), American actor
- Celia Britton (born 1946), British scholar of French Caribbean literature and thought
- Chris Britton (baseball) (born 1982), American baseball player
- Christopher Britton (actor) (born 1961), Canadian-born actor
- Cliff Britton (1909–1975), British football player and manager
- Connie Britton (born 1968), American actress
- David Britton (1945–2020), British publisher, writer and artist
- David Britton (basketball) (born 1958), American basketball player
- Devin Britton, American professional tennis player
- Ellen Alice Britton (1874–1959), British entomologist
- Elizabeth Gertrude Britton (1858–1934), American botanist
- Evonne Britton (born 1991), American hurdler
- Fern Britton (born 1957), British television presenter
- Fionnuala Britton (born 1984), European champion in cross country
- Fred C. Britton (1889–1931) artist and educator in South Australia
- George Bryant Britton (1863–1929), English boot and shoe manufacturer and Liberal Party Member of Parliament
- Gerry Britton (born 1970), Scottish footballer and manager
- Gunner Britton (born 2000), American football player
- Halland Britton (1890–1975), English runner
- Helene Hathaway Robison Britton (1879–1950), American owner of St. Louis Cardinals
- Ian Britton (English footballer) (born 1956), English footballer
- Ian Britton (Scottish footballer) (1954–2016), Scottish footballer
- Jack Britton (1885–1962), three-time world welterweight boxing champion
- James Britton (disambiguation), several individuals
- Jane Britton (1945–1969), female murder victim
- Jill Britton (1944–2016), Canadian mathematics educator
- John Britton (antiquary) (1771–1857), English antiquarian
- John Britton (doctor) (1925–1994), assassinated abortion provider
- John Britton (martyr) (15??–1598), English Catholic martyr, executed during the reign of Elizabeth I
- John Britton (mathematician) (1927–1994), British mathematician
- Leon Britton (born 1982), English footballer
- Nan Britton (1896–1991), mistress of U.S. President Warren G. Harding
- Nathaniel Lord Britton (1859–1934), American botanist
- Pamela Britton (1923–1974), American actress
- Pamela Britton (author) (born 1971), American author
- Samantha Britton (born 1973), English retired footballer
- Sherry Britton (1918–2008), American burlesque performer
- Toby Britton (born 2006), Jersey cricketer
- Tony Britton (1924–2019), English actor
- W. H. Britton (1892–1982), American college basketball and football coach
- Wilton Everett Britton (1868–1939), American entomologist and botanist
- Zack Britton (born 1987), American baseball player

== See also ==
- Brittan
- Britten (surname)
