= Britton =

Britton may refer to:

- Britton (law), an ancient summary of the Laws of England
- Britton (given name)
- Britton (surname)

== Places ==
=== Canada ===
- Britton, Ontario

=== United States ===
- Britton, Michigan
- Britton, Oklahoma
- Britton, South Dakota
- Britton, Texas

== See also ==
- Britten (disambiguation)
- Briton (disambiguation)
