= Brittain (surname) =

Brittain is a surname. Notable people with the surname include:

- Bill Brittain (1930–2011), American author
- Charles Francis Brittain (born 1950), American philosopher
- Colin Brittain (born 1986), American drummer
- Donald Brittain (1928–1989), Canadian filmmaker
- Erica Brittain, American biostatistician
- Joe Brittain, English rugby league footballer of the 1910s, and 1920s
- Marion Luther Brittain (1865–1953), U.S. educator
- Martin Brittain (born 1984), English professional football player
- Neil Brittain, Northern Irish television presenter and journalist
- Paul Brittain, American actor and comedian, Saturday Night Live
- Ronald Brittain, MBE (1899–1981), British Regimental Sergeant Major (R.S.M.)
- Thomas Brittain (1806–1884), British naturalist
- Thomas Lewis Brittain (1744–1827), English Dominican
- Vera Brittain (1893–1970), English writer, feminist, and pacifist
- Victoria Brittain (born 1942), British journalist and author
- Wayne Brittain, Australian Football League (AFL) coach
