= Britton (given name) =

Britton is a given name. Notable people with the name include:

== Men ==
- Britton Chance (1913–2010), professor of biochemistry and biophysics
- Britton Chance, Jr. (1940–2012), American naval architect yacht designer
- Britton Colquitt (born 1985), National Football League punter
- Britton Johnsen (born 1979), American basketball player
- Britton Rice (born 1981), American musician

== Women ==
- Britton Wilson (born 2000), American athlete

== See also ==
- Britton (disambiguation)
- Britton (surname)
