= John Britton =

John Britton may refer to:

- John Britton (antiquary) (1771–1857), English antiquary, topographer, author and editor
- John Britton (baseball) (1919–1990), American baseball player
- John Britton (doctor) (1925–1994), American physician and abortion provider, killed by Paul Jennings Hill
- John Britton (martyr) (died 1598), English Roman Catholic martyr
- John Britton (mathematician) (1927–1994), English mathematician, combinatorial group theorist
- John Edwin Britton (1924–2020), Canadian politician
- Jack Britton (1885–1962), American boxer
- Jack Britton (footballer) (1900–1953), Scottish football goalkeeper
- John Britton (swimmer), (1923–2004), British and Kenyan Paralympian
