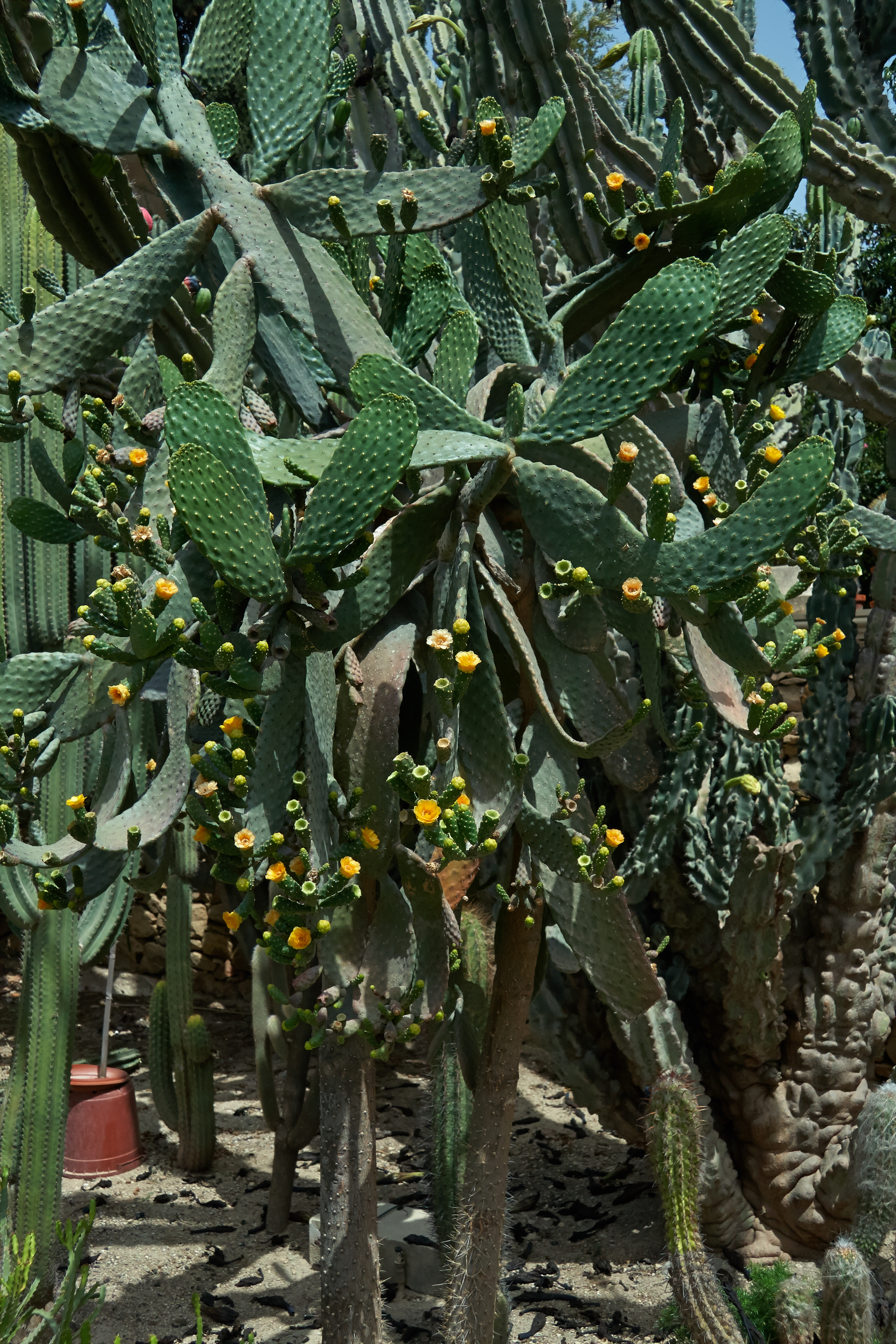

Conservation status
- Least Concern (IUCN 3.1)

Scientific classification
- Kingdom: Plantae
- Clade: Tracheophytes
- Clade: Angiosperms
- Clade: Eudicots
- Order: Caryophyllales
- Family: Cactaceae
- Genus: Consolea
- Species: C. rubescens

Binomial name
- Consolea rubescens (Salm-Dyck ex DC.) Lem., 1862

Synonyms
- List: Consolea catocantha (Pfeiff.) Lem., 1862 Consolea guanicana (K.Schum. ex Gürke) F.M.Knuth, 1936; Consolea moniliformis subsp. rubescens (Salm-Dyck ex DC.) Guiggi, 2007 Opuntia catocantha Pfeiff., 1837; Opuntia guanicana K.Schum. ex Gürke, 1908 Opuntia rubescens Salm-Dyck ex DC., 1828 (basionym); Opuntia spinosissima K.Schum., 1898

= Consolea rubescens =

Species of cactus

Consolea rubescens, known as the road kill cactus, sour prickly pear, and tree cactus, is a species of succulent of the genus Consolea, in the family Cactaceae. It is found in Puerto Rico and the Leeward Antilles.

== Description ==
Consolea rubescens is a species of cactus that grows in the form of a tree, with a branched crown, growing up to 6 m tall. It forms an erect trunk with a nearly cylindrical base that is slightly laterally compressed in the upper section. It reaches a diameter of up to 15 cm, and has clusters of spines up to 8 cm long, although these may sometimes be absent.

Segmented, flattened branches come out of the trunk, measuring up to 25 cm in length. They are elongated or oval, ranging in color from dark green to reddish-green, and exhibit a net-like pattern during the juvenile stage. The branches have areoles spaced 1 to 1.5 cm apart, slightly raised on small protuberances (tubercles). These protuberances feature glochids and whitish, needle-like spines—ranging from 1 to 6 cm in length—though the spines may sometimes be absent.

The flowers are yellow-orange in color, gradually turning red, and open during the daytime. They measure up to 6 cm in length and have a diameter of 2 cm. The fruit, ranging in shape from oval to spherical, are reddish in color, and reach a diameter of up to 8 cm.

== Distribution and habitat ==
The native distribution range of Consolea rubescens extends from Puerto Rico to the Leeward Islands, and it grows primarily in the seasonally dry tropical biome at elevations of 0 to 50 meters.

== Taxonomy ==
The first description of this species was Opuntia rubescens, published in 1828 by the botanists Joseph zu Salm-Reifferscheidt-Dyck and Augustin Pyramus de Candolle in the book Prodromus Florae Novae Hollandiae et Insulae Van Diemen 3: 474.

Later, French botanist Charles Lemaire transferred the species to the genus Consolea, and renamed the species Consolea rubescens. He recorded these changes in the journal Revue Horticole 11:174, published in 1862.

=== Etymology ===
- Consolea: a generic name given in honor of the Italian botanist Michelangelo Console, a professor at the Jardín Botánico de Palermo.
- rubescens: a Latin epithet meaning 'turning red', referring to the color of the species' stems.

== Conservation status ==
On the IUCN Red List, Consolea rubescens is classified as “Least-concern species (LC)”.

== Uses ==
It is primarily cultivated as an ornamental plant and it is propagated via cuttings and seeds.

== Gallery ==
Plant in habitat

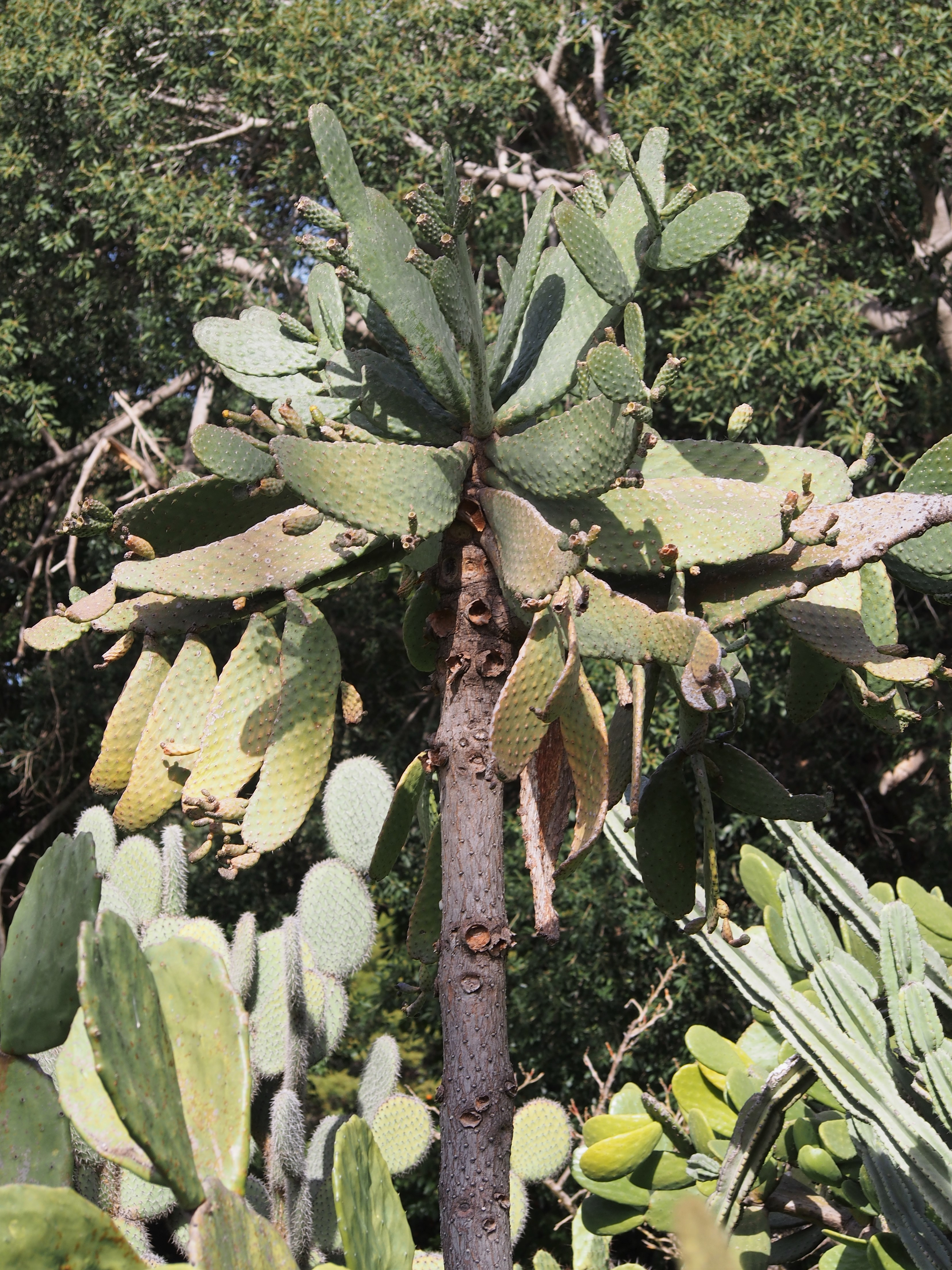
Plant in habitat

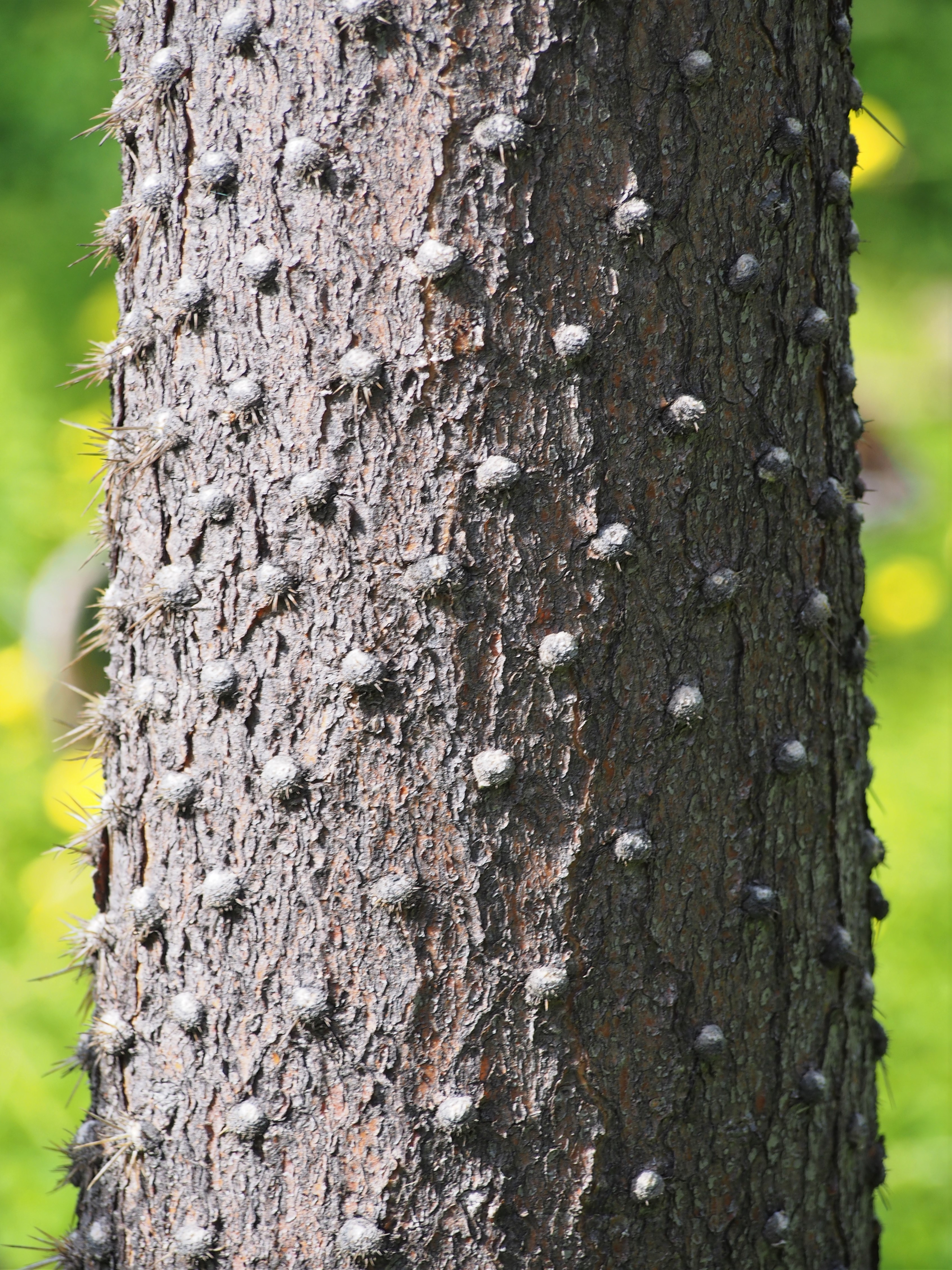
Trunk detail

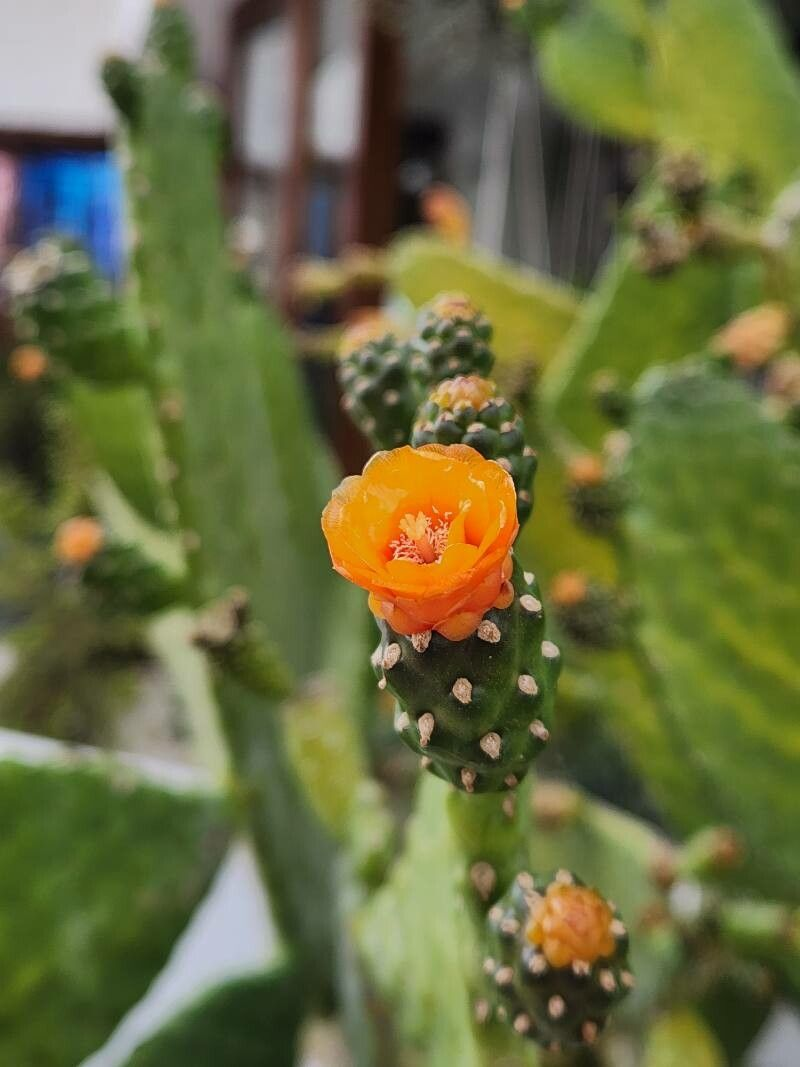
Flower detail

Fruit detail
