= Britten (disambiguation) =

Benjamin Britten (1913–1976) was an English composer, conductor and pianist.

Britten or Benjamin Britten may also refer to:

- Britten (surname)
- 4079 Britten, an outer main-belt asteroid
- Britten Inlet, an ice-filled inlet on Monteverdi Peninsula, Antarctica
- Britten (Losheim am See), a village in the Losheim am See municipality
- Britten Motorcycle Company, a New Zealand motorcycle company founded by John Britten
- Benjamin Britten (train)
- The Benjamin Britten High School, a high school in Lowestoft, Suffolk, UK

== See also ==
- Britain (disambiguation)
- Briton (disambiguation)
- Brittain (disambiguation)
- Brittan, a surname
- Britten-Norman, a British aircraft manufacturer
- Britton (surname)
- Brython, a pre-Roman inhabitant of Great Britain
