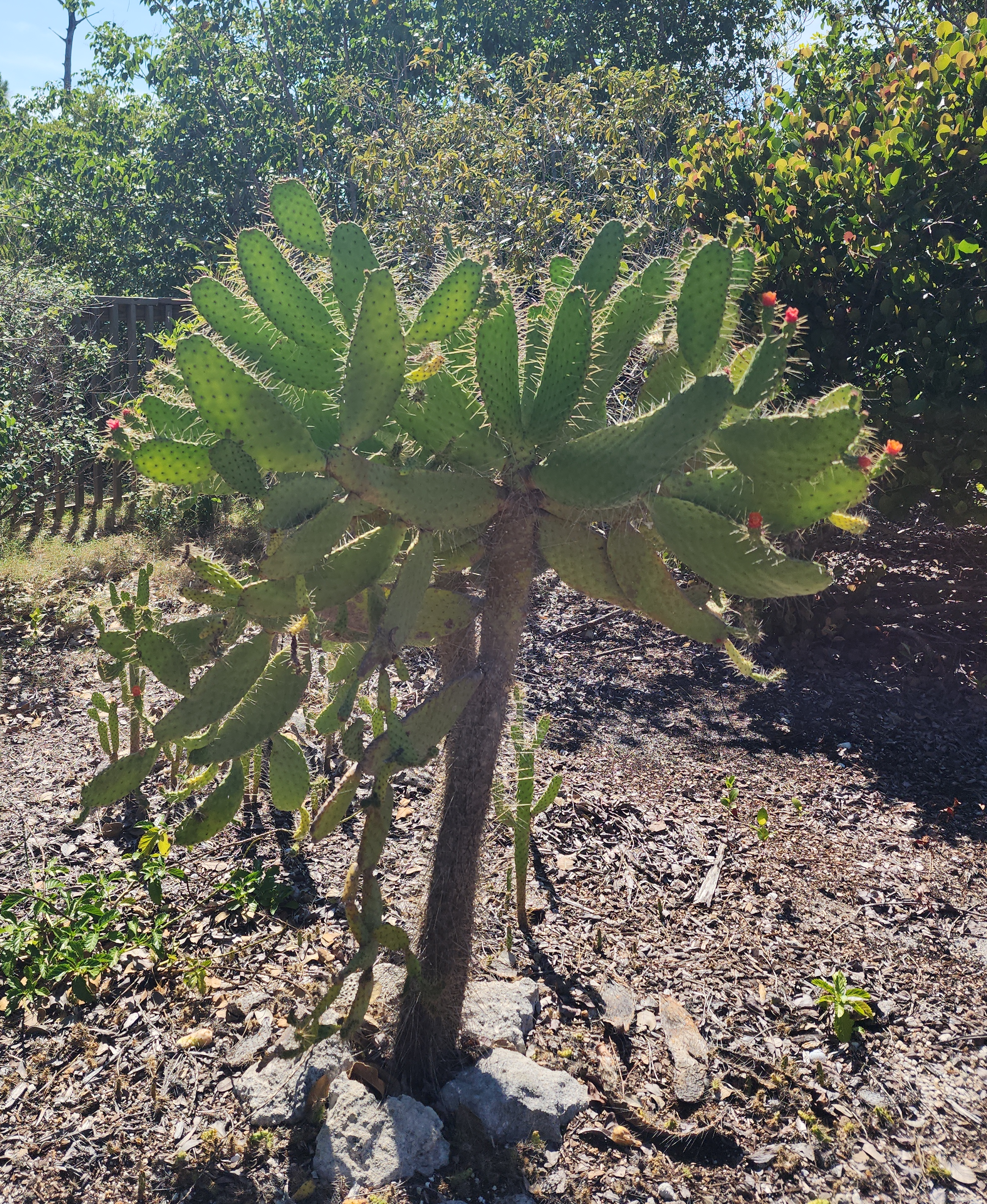
- Reintroduction to maritime pine rockland

Conservation status
- Critically Endangered (IUCN 3.1)

- Critically Imperiled (NatureServe)

Scientific classification
- Kingdom: Plantae
- Clade: Embryophytes
- Clade: Tracheophytes
- Clade: Angiosperms
- Clade: Eudicots
- Order: Caryophyllales
- Family: Cactaceae
- Genus: Consolea
- Species: C. corallicola

Binomial name
- Consolea corallicola Small

Synonyms
- Opuntia corallicola

= Consolea corallicola =

Species of cactus

Consolea corallicola is a species of cactus known by the common names Florida semaphore cactus and semaphore pricklypear. It is endemic to Florida in the United States, where it is limited to the Florida Keys.

== Description ==
This cactus is a species of tree which grows up to eight feet (2.4 m) tall. The stem segments are up to 40 centimeters long and are "copiously armed" with pink spines which can exceed 12 centimeters in length. The spines on the trunk all point downward and are the largest spines on the plant. The flowers, which have a scent reminiscent of rotting meat, have fleshy outer tepals and red-colored inner tepals that reach 2.5 centimeters in length. Flowering occurs year-round, with a peak season in December through April. This cactus is colonial, forming colonies of "trunked" plants and several "pups". This species' common name refers to its resemblance to railway semaphore signals.

== Distribution ==
It has been extirpated from several of the Keys, including Big Pine Key, the island where it was first discovered in 1919. Today there are two populations, one on Little Torch Key and one on Swan Key. There is also a patch of plants growing where several fragments were planted on North Key Largo. Because the plant is colonial, with what appear to be several plants actually being parts of one genetic individual, populations are very small, sometimes containing fewer than five true individuals. One population is composed of only male plants and cannot reproduce sexually. There are a total of under 20 distinct individuals living in the wild today. It is listed by the IUCN as "critically endangered."

== Habitat and ecology ==
The habitat for this species is bare rock with thin pockets of humus located in hardwood hammocks or the ecotone between hammock and mangrove habitat. The substrate is Key Largo limestone with a covering of sand. The habitat is near sea level. Associated species include Sporobolus virginicus, Conocarpus erectus, Maytenus phyllanthoides, Manilkara bahamensis, Hippomane mancinella, and Opuntia stricta var. dillenii.

== Conservation ==
This "is an extremely rare species" that is "near extinction", according to many conservation sources, considering that it "may very well be the most endangered plant in the United States". Among the worst immediate threats to the species today is Cactoblastis cactorum, an invasive, non-native species of moth that eats cacti. It is also threatened by hurricane activity and sea-level rise, which can affect it because it lives near sea level. It has trouble reproducing because one population is all male and can only reproduce vegetatively. It is also suffering from a rot disease. Other threats include scale insects, poaching and habitat destruction and degradation.

Consolea corallicola was listed as a federally endangered species in 2013 under the Endangered Species Act of 1973 along with Chromolaena frustrata and Harrisia aboriginum, two other plant species of South Florida. It was noted in the listing that only two wild populations of this species remain, and that the majority of plants reintroduced to natural habitats between 1996 and 2004 did not survive while the survivors were stunted. Plants reintroduced to one state-owned site had been accidentally destroyed during a trail expansion. Another site of reintroduction was eliminated by salt water exposure from extremes of tidal variation. Reintroductions have also faced challenges from Cactoblastis activity, crown rot associated with Fusarium oxysporum and possibly a Phomopsis sp. and leaf litter burying plantings. By contrast, captive plants flourish. According to the U.S. Fish and Wildlife Service, none of the remaining wild populations contain female individuals and are thus reliant on asexual reproduction. Sea level rise threatens the remaining habitat of C. corallicola, causing saltwater intrusion into groundwater. Poaching is a significant threat in the short term.

== Gallery ==
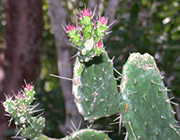

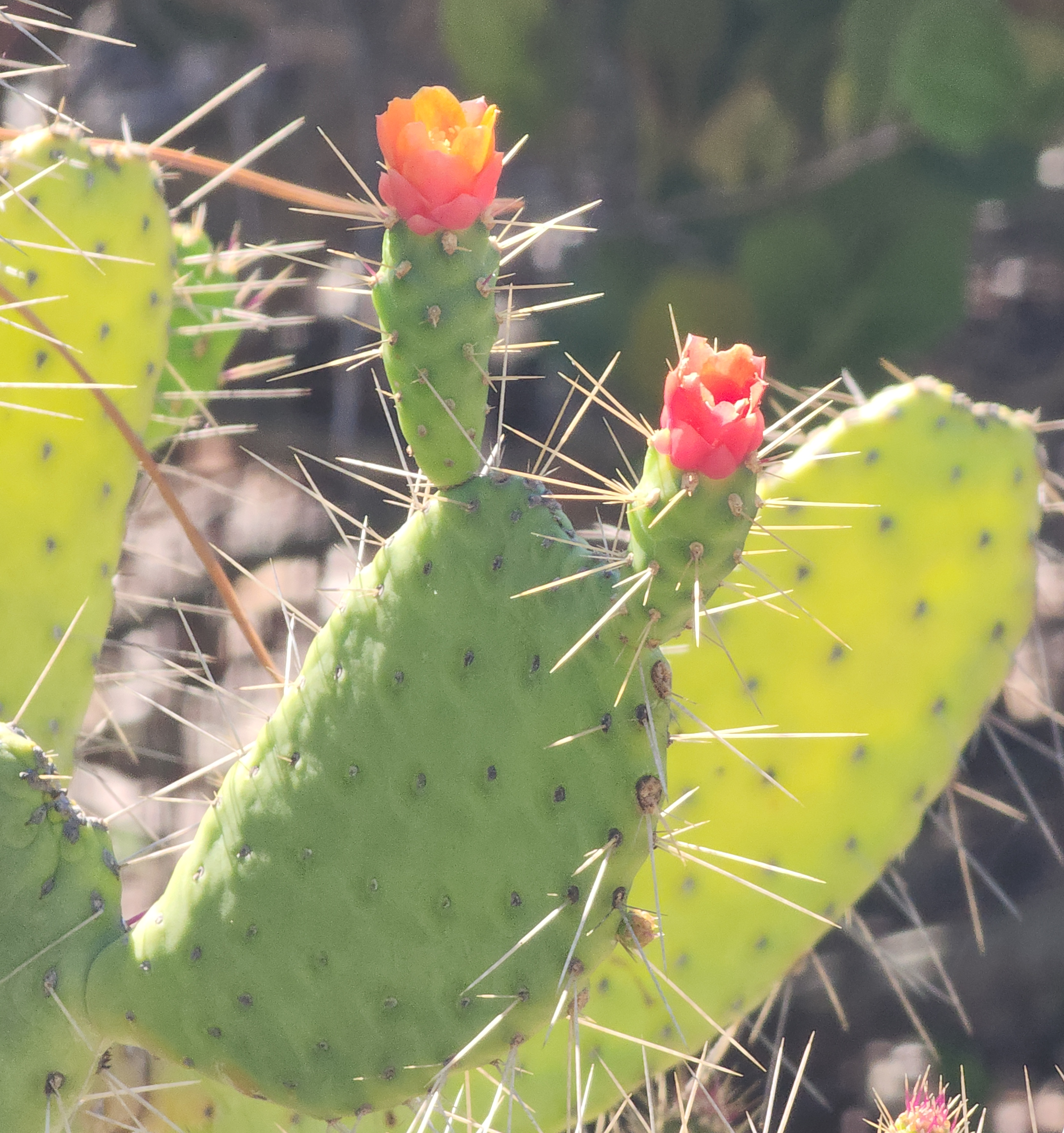
