= Britten (surname) =

Britten is a surname, originally referring to a person from Brittany. Notable people with the surname include:

- Benjamin Britten (1913–1976), British composer, conductor, and pianist
- Bill Britten (1828–1920), American actor best known for his portrayal of Bozo the Clown
- Emma Hardinge Britten (1823–1899), spiritualist
- Frederick A. Britten (1871–1946), U.S. Representative from Illinois
- Harry Britten (1870–1954), English entomologist
- James Britten (1846–1924), English botanist
- John Britten (1950–1995), New Zealand motorcycle designer
- Linda Britten, Australian fashion designer
- Mark Britten, American comedian with stage name "The Chinaman"
- Paul Britten Austin (1922–2005), English author, broadcaster and translator
- Rhonda Britten (born 1960), founder of the Fearless Living Institute
- Roy John Britten (1919–2012), American molecular biologist
- Sébastien Britten (born 1970), Canadian figure skater
- Terry Britten (born 1947), English singer-songwriter

== See also ==
- Brittan
- Britton (surname)
