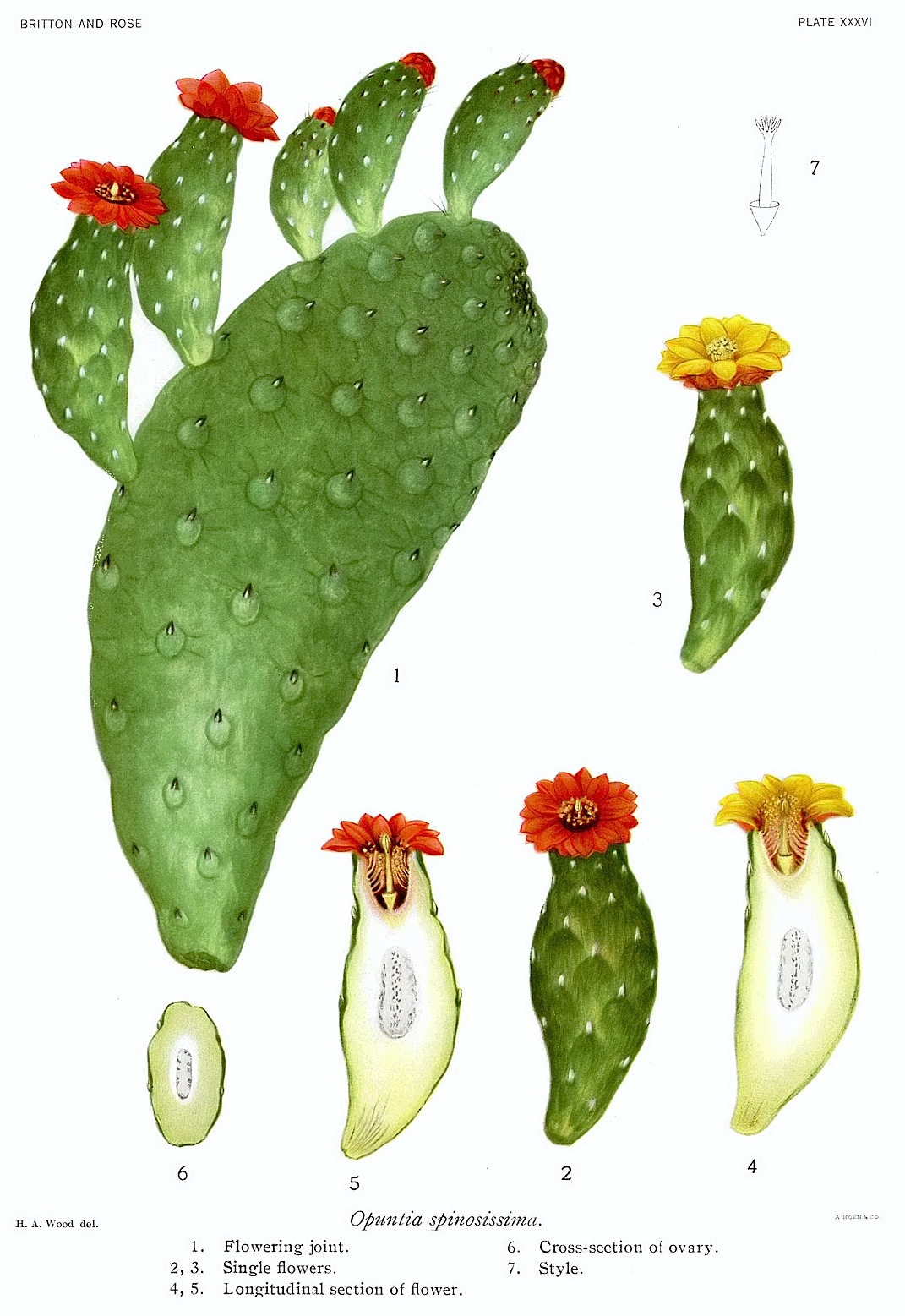
- Consolea spinosissima

Scientific classification
- Kingdom: Plantae
- Clade: Tracheophytes
- Clade: Angiosperms
- Clade: Eudicots
- Order: Caryophyllales
- Family: Cactaceae
- Subfamily: Opuntioideae
- Tribe: Opuntieae
- Genus: Consolea; Lem.

Species
- See text

= Consolea =

Genus of cactus

Consolea is a genus of cactus, named after Italian botanist Michelangelo Console. Members of the genus are native to the West Indies and Florida in the United States. Members of this genus consist of trees up to 10 m in height; they are dioecious or subdioecious.

== Accepted species ==
As of September 2026, Plants of the World Online accepted 10 species:

Image	Scientific name	Distribution	Conservation status
	Consolea corallicola Small	Little Torch Key and Swan Key in the Florida Keys	CR
	Consolea falcata (Ekman & Werderm) F.M.Knuth	Hispaniola (Haiti)	CR
	Consolea macracantha (Griseb.) A.Berger	Cuba	LC
	Consolea millspaughii (Britton) A.Berger	Cuba, The Bahamas, Cayman Islands	LC
	Consolea moniliformis (L.) A.Berger	Cuba, Hispaniola (Dominican Republic, Haiti), Puerto Rico (Mona Island, Culebra, Desecheo Island)	LC
	Consolea nashii (Britton) A.Berger	Cuba, The Bahamas, Turks and Caicos Islands	LC
	Consolea picardae (Urb.) Areces	Southern and eastern Hispaniola (Dominican Republic, Haiti)	DD
	Consolea rubescens (Salm-Dyck. ex DC.) Lem.	Puerto Rico and Lesser Antilles (from Virgin Islands to Trinidad and Tobago)	LC
	Consolea spinosissima (Mill.) Lem.	Jamaica	EN
	Consolea testudinis-crus (F.A.C.Weber) Mottram & Hoxey	Hispaniola	NE
