= Brittin =

Brittin is a surname. Notable people with the surname include:

- Dingley Askham Brittin (1823–1881), English solicitor
- Jack Brittin (1924–1994), American baseball player
- Jan Brittin (born 1959), English cricketer
- Matt Brittin (born 1968), British businessman, director-general of the BBC (2026–)
- Nelson V. Brittin (1920–1951), American soldier

== See also ==
- Brittain
