= James Britton =

James Britton may refer to:

- James H. Britton (1817–1900), mayor of St. Louis, Missouri, United States
- James Britton (painter) (1878–1936), American painter and art critic
- James Clelland Britton (1903–1984), Canadian diplomat in the 1950s and 1960s
- Jim Britton (born 1944), American baseball pitcher
- James N. Britton (1908–1994), British educator
