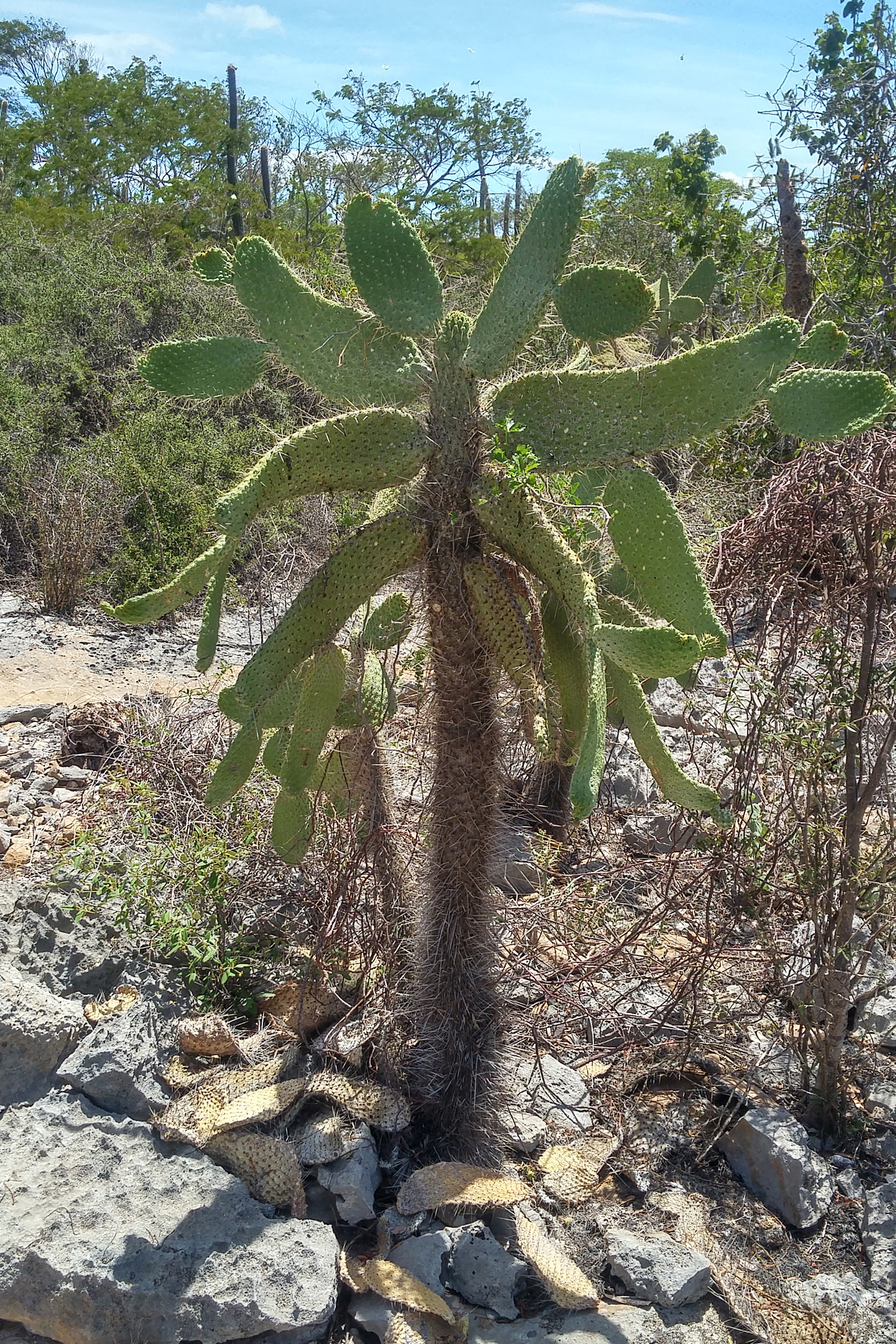

Conservation status
- Least Concern (IUCN 3.1)

Scientific classification
- Kingdom: Plantae
- Clade: Tracheophytes
- Clade: Angiosperms
- Clade: Eudicots
- Order: Caryophyllales
- Family: Cactaceae
- Genus: Consolea
- Species: C. moniliformis

Binomial name
- Consolea moniliformis (L.) A.Berger, 1926

Synonyms
- List: *Airampoa panellana (Backeb.) Doweld; *Cactus ferox Willd.; *Cactus moniliformis L.; *Cereus moniliformis (L.) DC.; *Consolea ferox (Willd.) Lem.; *Consolea moniliformis subsp. guantanamana Areces; *Consolea urbaniana (Werderm.) F.M.Knuth; *Nopalea moniliformis (L.) K.Schum.; *Opuntia armata var. panellana Backeb.; *Opuntia dolabriformis Pfeiff.; *Opuntia ferox Haw.; *Opuntia haitiensis Britton; *Opuntia moniliformis (L.) Haw. ex Steud.; *Opuntia moniliformis f. guantanamana (Areces) Govaerts; *Opuntia panellana (Backeb.) Backeb.; *Opuntia urbaniana Werderm.

= Consolea moniliformis =

Species of cactus

Consolea moniliformis is a species of cactus that is native to the Greater Antilles, on Cuba, Hispaniola (in the Dominican Republic and Haiti), and Puerto Rico (on the islands of Mona, Culebra and Desecheo). The species forms small shrubs, with vividly green falciform pads and is often growing near the coast. On Hispaniola it is often confused with Consolea testudinis-crus a species that forms large tree-like plants with bluish-grey pads, in Puerto Rico it is at times confused with Consolea rubescens.

== Names ==
Missapplied common names include:

- English: necklace-like pricklypear (in fact Consolea rubescens)
- French: Opuntia patte-de-tortue, patte de tortue, patte tortue (all in fact Consolea testudinis-crus), raquette espagnole (Haiti)
- Spanish: alpargata (Dominican Republic), tuna (Puerto Rico)
- Haitian Creole: pat tôti (in fact Consolea testudinis-crus), rakèt panyôl

== Conservation ==
Damage from the invasive moth Cactoblastis cactorum was not recorded in Dominican populations, but moderately present in Puerto Rican populations. Deforestation in Haiti has led to the suspicion of its extirpation there. Despite these threats, the species is considered Least Concern by the IUCN Red List.

== Bibliography ==
- Forest & Kim Starr. Plants of Hawaii.
- Grandtner, M. M. (2005). Elsevier's Dictionary of Trees. Amsterdam: Elsevier. ISBN 0-444-51784-7.
- Liogier, Alain H. (1994). Descriptive Flora of Puerto Rico and Adjacent Islands: Spermatophyta. Cyrillaceae to Myrtaceae. Puerto rico: Editorial de la Universidad de Puerto Rico. ISBN 0-8477-2333-X.
