= James Cleland Britton =

Canadian former diplomat

James Britton
- Born: James Cleland Britton; April 24, 1903; York, Ontario, Canada
- Died: March 30, 1984 (aged 80); Burlington, Ontario, Canada
- Other name: Jim Britton
- Occupations: trade commissioner, diplomat

James Cleland "Bubs" Britton (April 24, 1903 – March 30, 1984) was a Canadian diplomat and sportsman. He was appointed Chargé d'affaires to Japan, then Ambassador to Italy, and then Ambassador Extraordinary and Plenipotentiary to Thailand.

== Biography ==
Britton was born in York, Ontario, in 1903 and was educated at Queen's University in Kingston, Ontario where he played both football and ice hockey on the school teams. In the early 1930s Britton also played ice hockey in the Ottawa City Hockey League for the Ottawa Shamrocks and the Ottawa Rideaus.

During the 1936–1937 season Britton worked as an assistant trade commissioner in Johannesburg, South Africa where he helped organize the South African Ice Hockey Association (SAIHA).

He would later work as a diplomat for Canada in Japan, Italy and Thailand.

Britton died on March 30, 1984, at the Joseph Brant Hospital in Burlington, Ontario at an age of 80.

Diplomatic posts
Preceded by Bertram Charles Butler	Ambassador Extraordinary and Plenipotentiary to Thailand; 1967–1969	Succeeded by Gordon Edwin Cox
Preceded by	Ambassador to Italy; 1967–	Succeeded by
Preceded by Hon. Thomas Clayton Davis	Chargé d'Affaires a.i. to Japan; 1954–	Succeeded by Theodore Francis Moorhouse Newton
