= Polydream =

- Origin: Madison, Wisconsin, United States
- Genres: Alternative rock, Rock, shoegazing
- Years active: 2003–2009
- Label: independent

Polydream was an alternative rock band hailing from Madison, Wisconsin. Formed in 2003, the band released an EP, titled A Rigid Shard of Balance: 1, and released its first full-length album, titled Send Me to the Sun, on December 15, 2007. Polydream gained much of its fame in being named "New Artist of the Year" at the Madison Area Music Awards in 2007.

== History ==
Lucas Etten and Jonathan Knudson formed a cover band called The Cadavers in Medford, Wisconsin in 1998. After a local youth center performance as sophomores in high school, Luke and Jon spoke with drummer Austin Britton and Jason Bloyer about forming a rock group.

The four joined Bloyer's brother Josh, who played bass, and performed until 2000. After Jason left the group, Knudson became the lead vocalist (he had already been playing guitar). The four-piece stopped playing later that year. After Knudson and Etten graduated from high school, Knudson moved to Glacier National Park in Montana, while Etten and Austin Britton kept in touch with Knudson throughout the summer.

Then, in September 2002, Etten and Austin drove to Montana and helped him move back to Madison, Wisconsin. Etten gave up the guitar so the band could have a bass player. In March 2003, the three decided on the name Polydream and began performing within a month. In December of that year, during a short hiatus, Knudson met guitarist Eric LeMieux. Knudson introduced LeMieux to the band and the four began performing in the summer of 2004.

At a December performance that year, the four got to know drummer/producer Britton Rice. Rice, formerly of Lex Rex, agreed to produce a couple of songs for the band. He spent most of 2005 working with the band on their debut EP, A Rigid Shard of Balance: 1. As the music became more piano based, Austin moved to piano and guitar and Rice filled in on drums to move the writing along. Rice joined Polydream as a full-time member.

Polydream released A Rigid Shard of Balance: 1 on July 14, 2006. The band went on to tour for the remainder of 2006. In late 2006 & early 2007 the band went back to the recording studio to lay down tracks for new material. They were named Best New Artist at the Madison Area Music Awards in 2007. In the summer, Polydream performed at Summerfest on the last day of the festival. Polydream released their debut album, titled Send Me to the Sun, which is a full-length follow-up to the previous EP. The record was released digitally on December 15, 2007 and has since been released on compact disc. The band broke up in 2009.

== Former members ==
- Eric LeMieux – guitar
- Britton Rice – drums
- Jonathan Knudson – vocals, guitar
- Lucas Etten – bass

== Discography ==
- A Rigid Shard of Balance: 1 (2006) - EP
- Send Me to the Sun (December 15, 2007)
