= Brittan =

Brittan is a surname. Notable people with the surname include:

- Colin Brittan (1927–2013), English footballer
- Harold Brittan (1894–1964), English-American football (soccer) player
- Harriet G. Brittan (1822–1897), British-born American missionary
- Leon Brittan (1939–2015), British baron Brittan of Spennithorne, barrister, and politician
- Samuel Brittan (1933–2020), British newspaper columnist and author
- Suzan Brittan (contemporary), American actress and singer

== See also ==
- Britten (disambiguation)
- Brittain (disambiguation)
