= Britton, Texas =

Unincorporated community in Ellis County, Texas, United States

Coordinates: 32°32′51.2″N 97°04′05.7″W

Britton is an unincorporated community in north-western Ellis County, Texas, United States.

== History ==
Britton was settled in 1895 under the name Helland and later Hellandville , named after Texas and New Orleans Railroad passenger agent Joseph Helland, later being renamed Britton after conductor H.C. Britton.

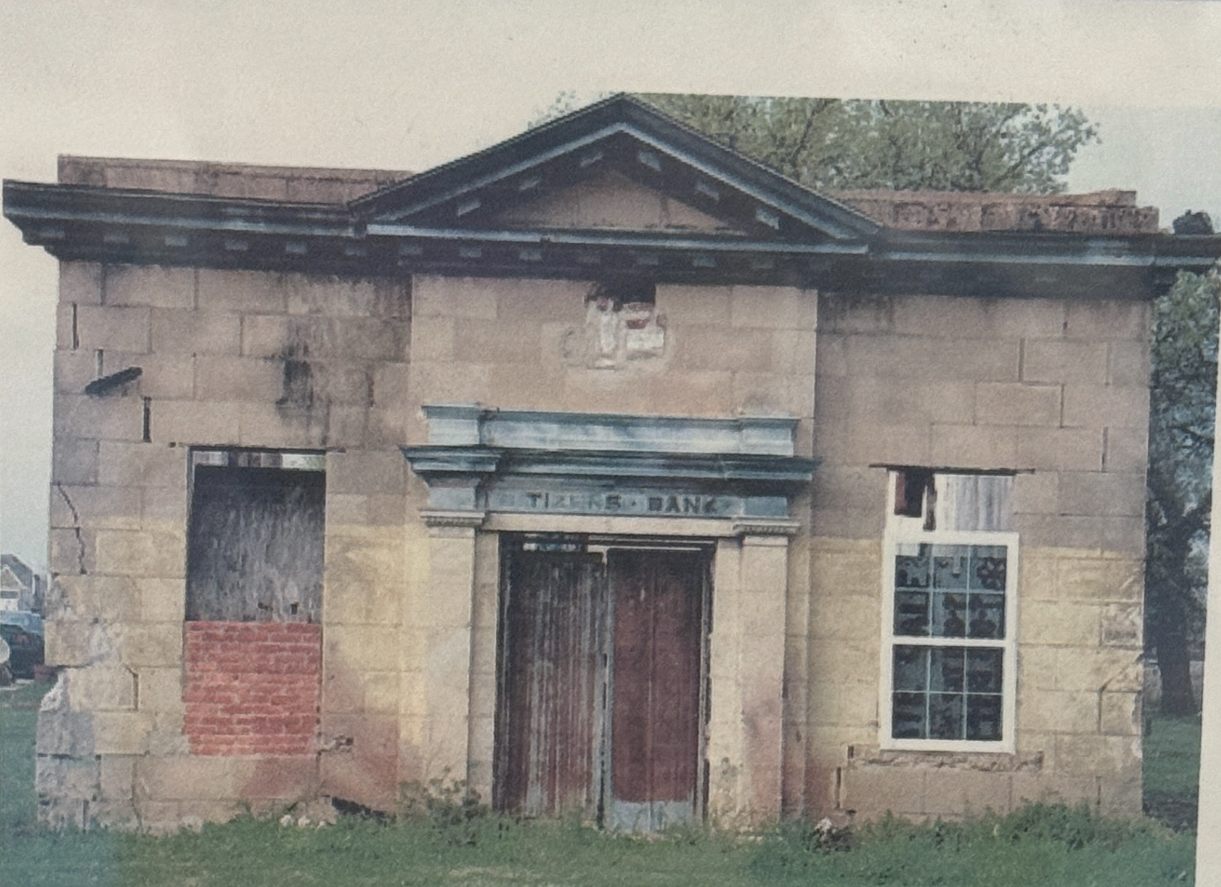
Britton Citizens Bank in Britton, Texas (1904-1920s), demolished in 2019

The community is located on the border of the city of Mansfield, and Joe Pool Lake.
