= Charles Francis Brittain =

American philosopher

Charles Brittain
- Born: 1966 (age 59–60)

Philosophical work
- Era: 21st-century philosophy
- Region: Western philosophy
- Institutions: Cornell University
- Main interests: ancient Greek philosophy

Charles Francis Brittain (born 1966) is an American philosopher who is the Susan Linn Sage Professor of Philosophy and Humane Letters at Cornell University. He specializes in ancient philosophy, specifically Hellenistic philosophy. His work lies within the Platonic tradition and draws on texts from Cicero, Augustine, and Simplicius.

== Books ==
- Philo of Larissa. The last of the Academic sceptics. Oxford, 2001
- Cicero: On Academic Scepticism. Hackett. 2006
- Simplicius On Epictetus Handbook 1-26 (ed.). London & Ithaca, 2002
- Simplicius On Epictetus Handbook 27-53. London & Ithaca, 2002, trans. with Tad Brennan, for the series The Greek commentators on Aristotle
- Plato: The Divided Self, edited with T. Brennan & R. Barney, Cambridge, 2012
