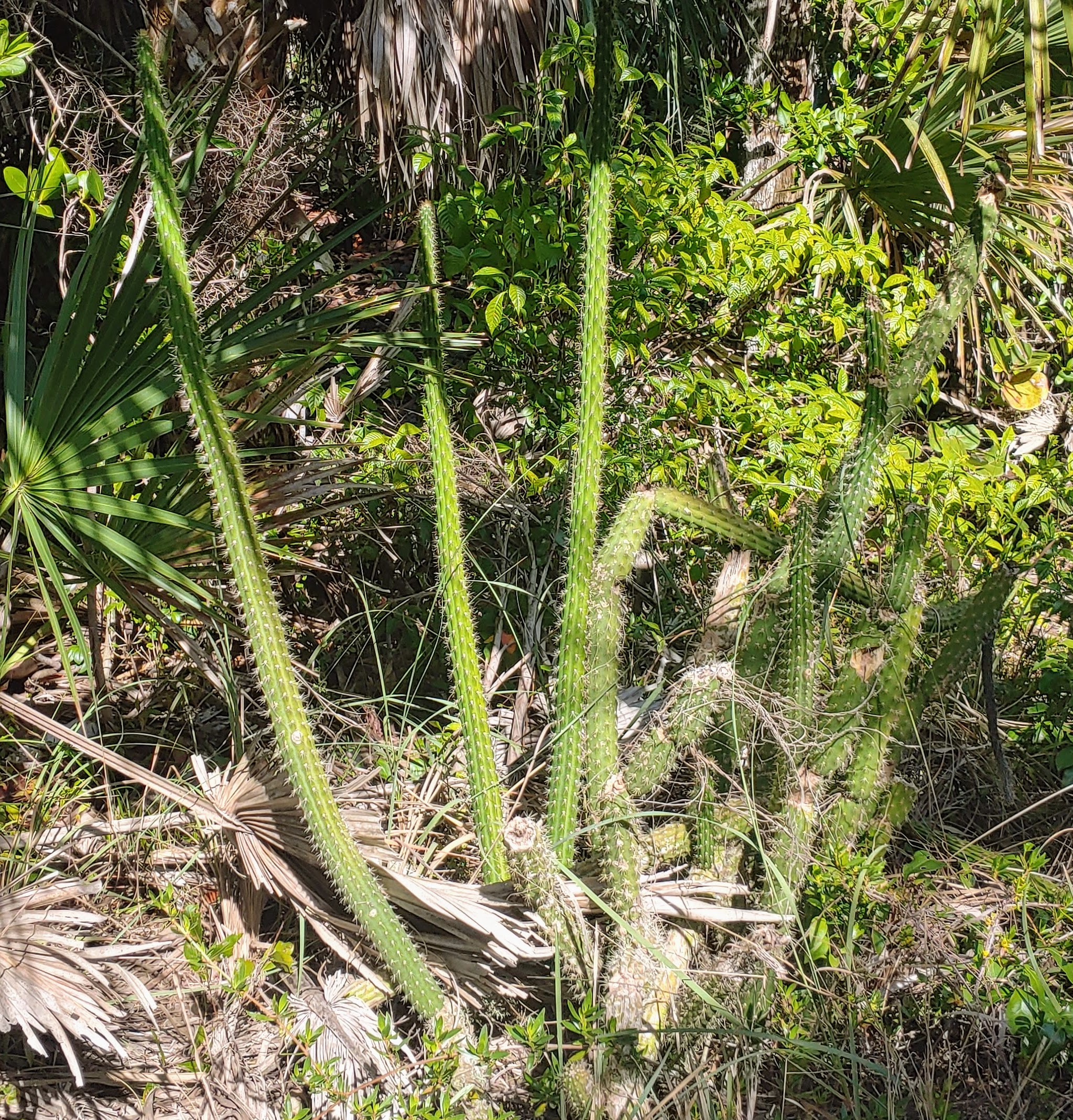

Conservation status
- Critically Imperiled (NatureServe)

Scientific classification
- Kingdom: Plantae
- Clade: Tracheophytes
- Clade: Angiosperms
- Clade: Eudicots
- Order: Caryophyllales
- Family: Cactaceae
- Subfamily: Cactoideae
- Genus: Harrisia
- Species: H. aboriginum

Binomial name
- Harrisia aboriginum Small ex Britton & Rose

Synonyms
- Cereus aboriginum (Small ex Britton & Rose) Little 1945; Cereus gracilis var. aboriginum (Small ex Britton & Rose) L.D.Benson 1969; Harrisia fragrans subsp. aboriginum (Small ex Britton & Rose) Guiggi 2020; Harrisia gracilis var. aboriginum (Small ex Britton & Rose) D.B.Ward 2004

= Harrisia aboriginum =

Species of cactus

Harrisia aboriginum (commonly known as the west-coast prickly apple, prickly applecactus, yellow prickly apple, and aboriginal prickly apple) is a species of columnar cactus endemic to peninsular Florida, on the Gulf Coast of the counties of Lee, Sarasota County, and Charlotte. Only 12 occurrences are known, and the species is threatened by horticultural collection, shading from fire suppression, competition from invasive flora, and most of all habitat destruction. It is a federally listed endangered species of the United States.

== Description ==
The west coast prickly apple is characterized by its slender columnar stems that sprawl out from a single base, simple or branched shoots and reaches heights of up to 6 meters. There are nine to eleven rounded ribs. The seven to nine needle-like, initially pink thorns turn gray with age and are up to 1 centimeter long. These plants can reach up to 20 feet in height though sometimes the stems recline with age. It has scented white flowers up to 15 centimeters long, and its flower tube is covered with stiff, brown hairs.The fruits that shifts from yellow to red through development, somewhat resembling the appearance of an apple, reach a diameter of 6 to 7.5 centimeters. Each fruit is packed full of hundreds of black seeds.

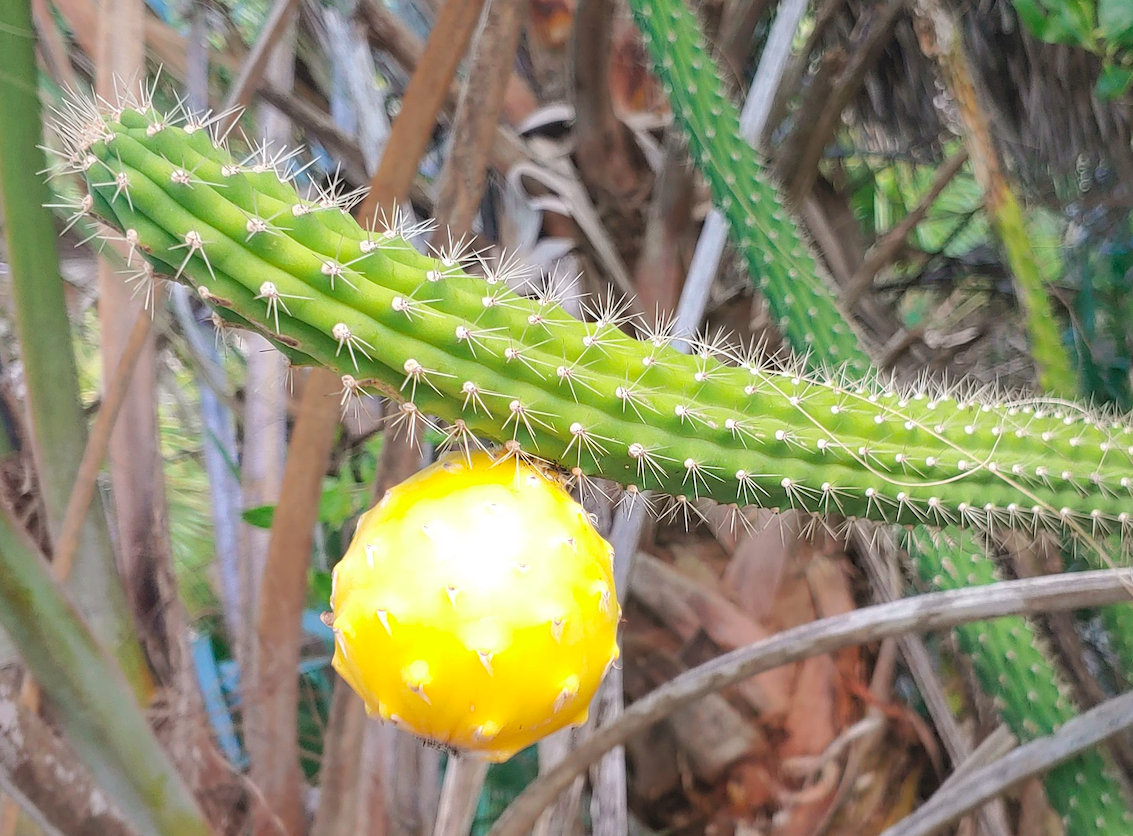
Closeup of cacti fruit.

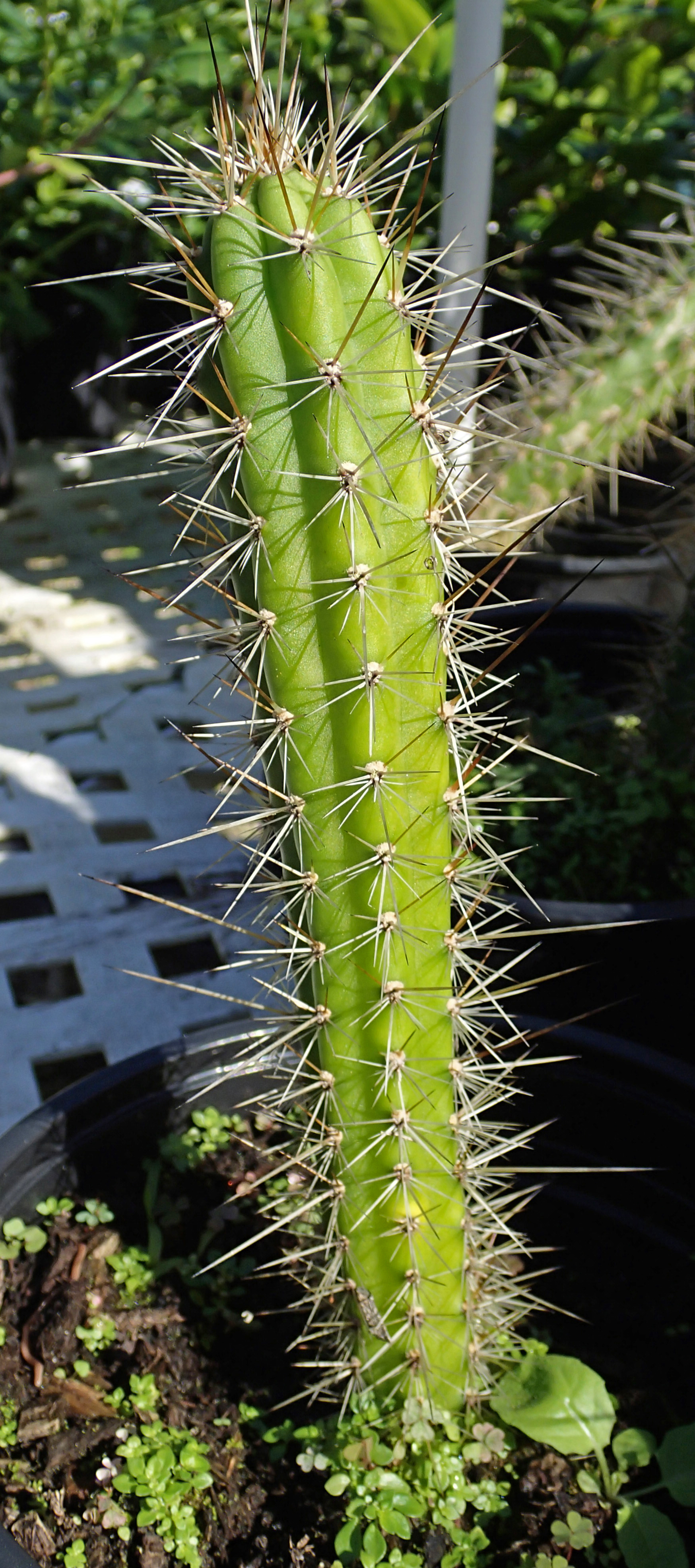
stems

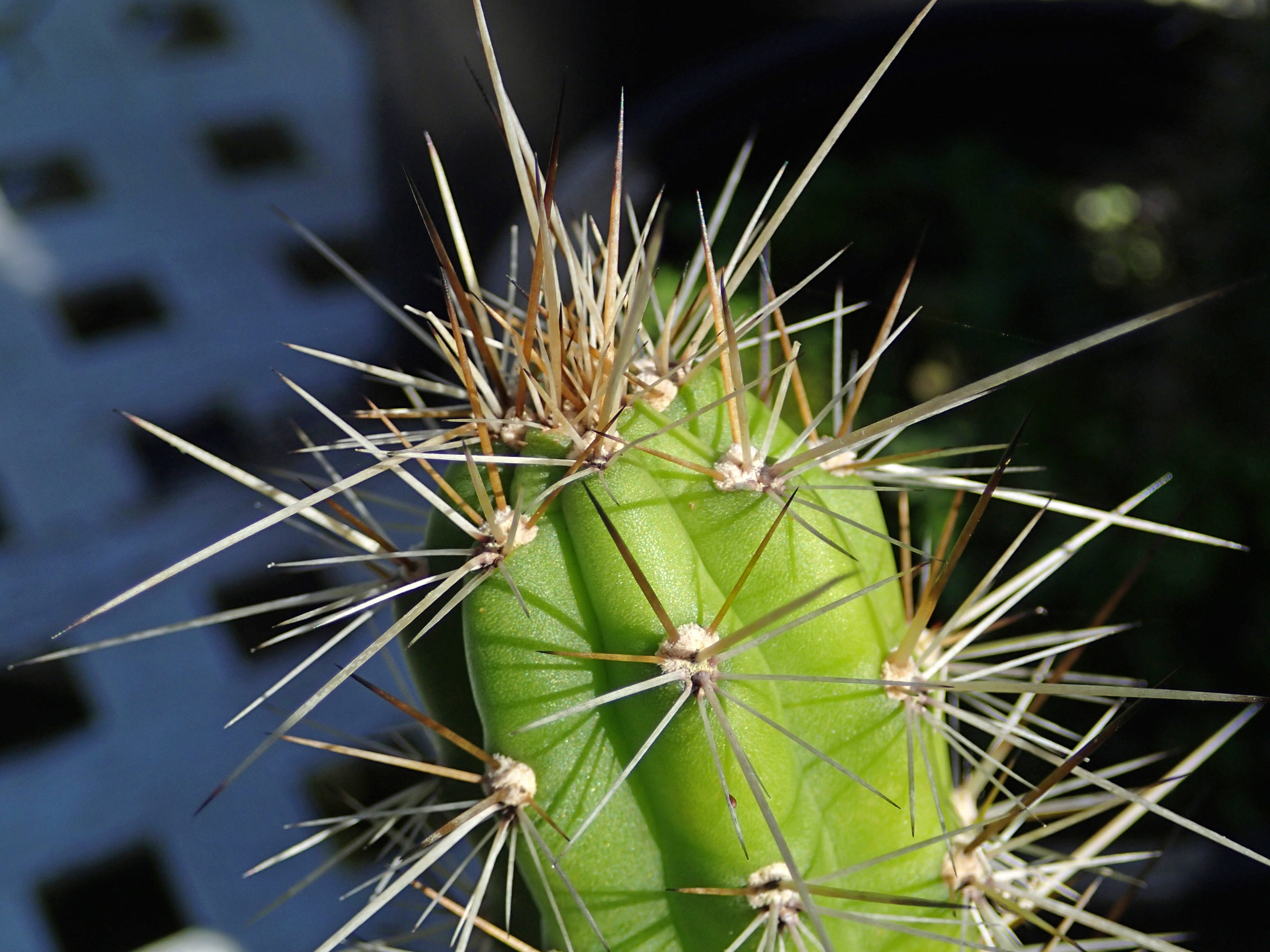

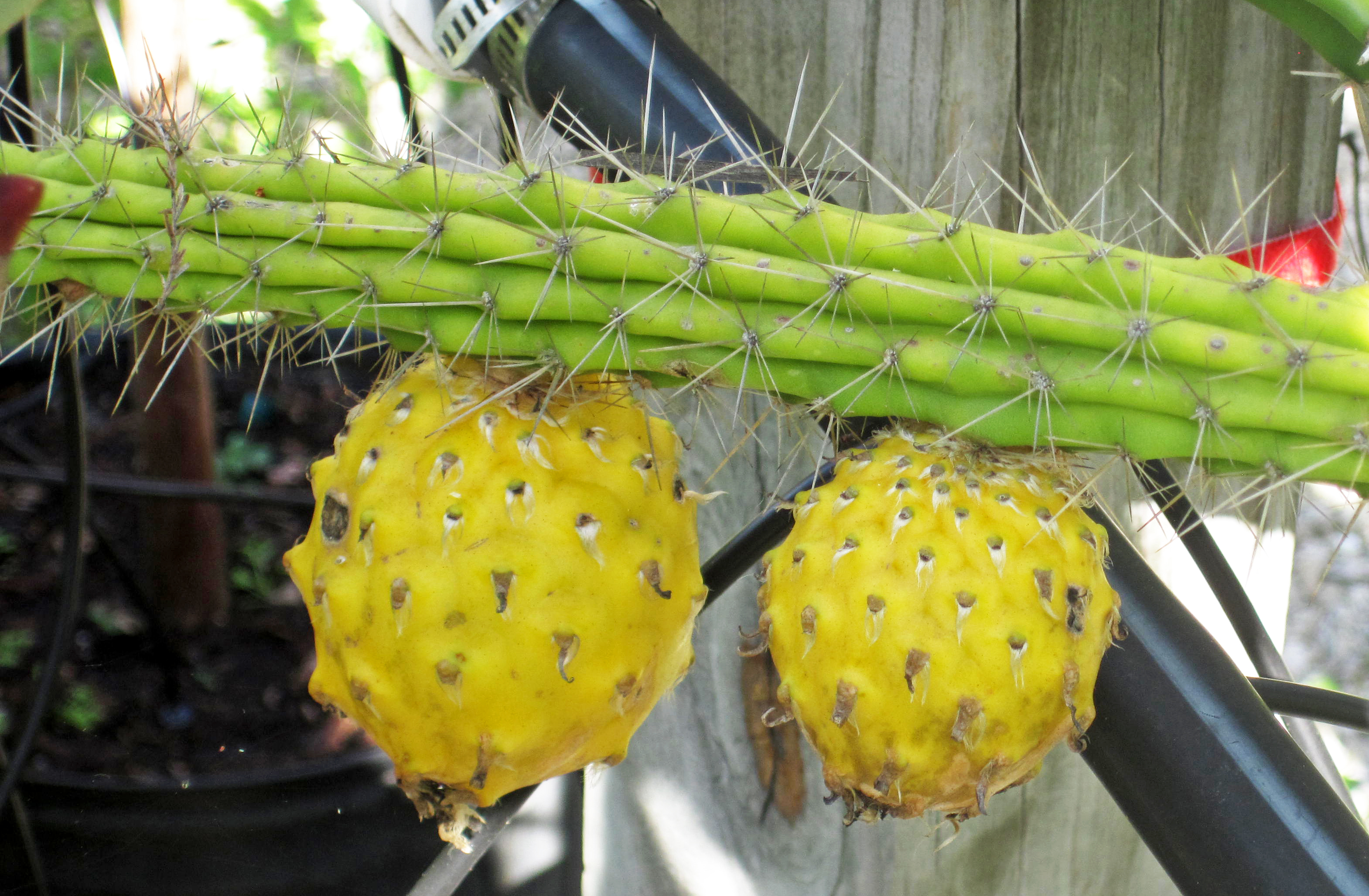
Fruit

== Habitat ==
The plant's natural habitat is usually coastal hammock strands. Thriving best in partial shade, these cacti are often found around larger trees including Live Oaks, Sabal palmetto or Wild Lime. Coastal hammocks of this kind have become uncommon in many coastal areas of central and south Florida due to clearing for development. This rapid overdevelopment is the main factor in the decline of the Prickly Apple population.

== Threats ==
While once spread through much of southern Florida and the keys, the remaining populations of the cactus can now be found in Sarasota and Lee counties in less than a dozen known locations. Currently, the Marie Selby Botanical Gardens are working closely with the US Fish & Wildlife Service, and the Florida Park Service to try and save it from extinction by cultivating individual cacti to be re-established in their former habitat.

== Taxonomy ==
The first description was made in 1920 by John Kunkel Small in Nathaniel Lord Britton and Joseph Nelson Rose's work The Cactaceae. Nomenclature synonyms are Cereus aboriginum (Small) Little (1945), Cereus gracilis var. aboriginum (Small) L.D.Benson (1969) and Harrisia gracilis var. aboriginum (Small) D.B.Ward (2004).
