= Erica Brittain =

American biostatistician

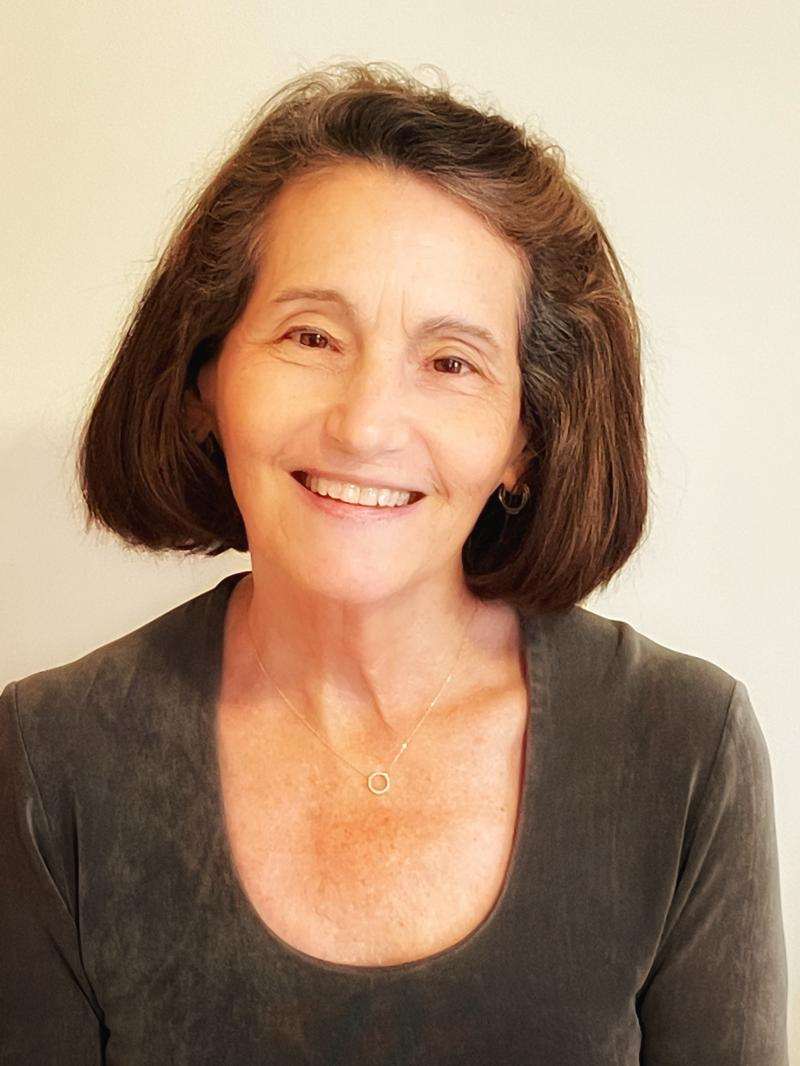
- Education: Tufts University; Stanford University; University of North Carolina
- Scientific career
- Fields: Biostatistics, clinical trials
- Workplaces: Food and Drug Administration; National Institutes of Health

Erica Hyde Brittain is an American biostatistician at the National Institute of Allergy and Infectious Diseases, where she is deputy branch chief in the Biostatistics Research Branch. Her research includes work on clinical trials. She is a coauthor of a book on statistical hypothesis tests, Statistical Hypothesis Testing in Context: Reproducibility, Inference, and Science (with Michael P. Fay, Cambridge University Press, 2022).

== Education and career ==
Brittain majored in mathematics at Tufts University, graduating in 1977. After earning a master's degree in statistics in 1980 from Stanford University, she completed a Ph.D. in 1984 at the University of North Carolina (UNC). Her dissertation, Determination of $p$-values for a $k$-sample extension of the Kolmogorov-Smirnov procedure, was advised by Thomas Fleming of the Mayo Clinic (where her fiancé worked) but officially supervised by Clarence E. (Ed) Davis at UNC.

After working for the Center for Drug Evaluation and Research and National Heart Lung and Blood Institute, she moved to the National Institute of Allergy and Infectious Diseases in 2003, and became deputy branch chief in 2013.

== Recognition ==
Brittain's book on hypothesis testing was a finalist in mathematics and statistics in the 2023 PROSE Awards.

She was elected as a Fellow of the American Statistical Association in 2023.
