= Thomas Brittain =

Thomas Brittain (2 January 1806 – 23 January 1884), was an English naturalist.

== Life ==
Brittain was born at Sheffield on 2 January 1806. He was educated at a private school. He was engaged during the greater part of his life as a professional accountant, but became interested in natural science, and was very skillful in the preparation of diagrams and in the mounting of objects for the microscope. In 1842, he moved to Manchester, where he spent the rest of his life. In some contributions to Axon's Field Naturalist, he told the story of his scientific studies from the time of his first microscope, which he obtained in 1834. In December 1858 he was one of the promoters of a Manchester Microscopical Society, which ultimately became a section of the Manchester Literary and Philosophical Society. When a second Manchester Microscopical Society - a more popular association - was established in 1879, he repeatedly held the office of vice-president, and was afterwards president. On his retirement, from failing health and advanced years, he was presented with an address at the Manchester Athenæum, 4 October 1883.

Brittain was connected with other scientific societies in Manchester and London. He was a clear and animated speaker, and for many years lectured on various subjects of natural science to a great number of the mechanics' institutes and similar organisations. He made frequent contributions to the Manchester City News, Unitarian Herald, and other papers on matters of scientific interest. He was also connected with the unsuccessful attempt to establish a Manchester aquarium, and had a short experience, from 1858 to 1860, of municipal work. He died at Manchester on 23 January 1884.

Brittain did not make any claim to be a discoverer, but he was a pleasant exponent of science, and did much to popularise the taste for natural history in his adopted home.

== Writings ==
- Half a Dozen Songs by Brittanicus Manchester, 1846, privately printed.
- A General Description of the Manchester Aquarium 1874, a pamphlet guide.
- Micro-Fungi, when and where to find them Manchester, 1882. This, in spite of some obvious defects, has been of considerable use to local students. It is arranged in the order of the months, and first appeared in the 'Northern Microcopist.'
- Whist : how to play and how to win, being the result of sixty years' play Manchester, 1882.
