= Brittain, West Virginia =

Unincorporated community in West Virginia, United States

Brittain
- Unincorporated community
- Location within the state of West Virginia Brittain (the United States)
- Coordinates: 39°22′45″N 80°3′6″W
- Country: United States
- State: West Virginia
- County: Taylor
- Elevation: 1,030 ft (310 m)
- Time zone: UTC-5 (Eastern (EST))
  - Summer (DST): UTC-4 (EDT)
- GNIS ID: 1689769

Brittain is an unincorporated community in Taylor County, West Virginia, United States.
