= Brittain Creek =

Stream in Henderson County, North Carolina, U.S.

Coordinates: 35°20′19″N 82°28′02″W

Brittain Creek is a stream in Henderson County, North Carolina, in the United States. It is a tributary of Mud Creek.

The stream was named for James C. Brittain, a pioneer who settled along the creek. The name of the creek was long misspelled as Britton Creek until a descendant of James C. Brittain successfully appealed to the United States Board on Geographic Names in the 1980s.

== See also ==
- List of rivers of North Carolina
