= Thomas Lewis Brittain =

Thomas Lewis Brittain (born near Chester, England, 1744; died at Hartpury Court, Hartpury, Gloucestershire 1827) was an English Dominican.

== Life ==
Brittain's parents were Protestants, but at the age of sixteen Thomas became a Catholic. Shortly after his conversion he went to Picardy to pursue his studies, and later joined the Dominicans at Bornheim, near Antwerp, where he made his profession 22 October 1767. Brittain's studies were continued at the Catholic University of Leuven, and subsequently he taught at Bornheim, where he was made regent of studies. In 1790 the doctor's cap, with title of Master of Sacred Theology, was conferred on him.

The same year Brittain was transferred to Brussels where he became director of the exiled English Dominican nuns, an office he held for thirty-seven years. In 1794, when the French army was expected at Brussels, Father Brittain led the sisters to Bornheim; joined by eighteen Dominican fathers, they were then conducted by an American captain to England. Father Brittain secured a foundation for the sisters at Hartpury Court near Gloucester.

On 3 May 1814, Brittain was elected provincial of the Dominicans, an office he held for four years.

== Works ==
He is the author of the following works:

- "Rudiments of English Grammar" (London, 1790), considered authoritative in its day and recommended by Walker, the lexicographer;
- "Principles of the Christian religion and Catholic Faith Investigated" (London, 1790);
- "Collection of Poems Occasionally Written" (Cheltenham, 1822);
- "The Divinity of Jesus Christ and beauties of His Gospels" (London, 1822);
- unpublished manuscripts in the archives of the English province.
