= Pamela Britton (author) =

American author of romance novels

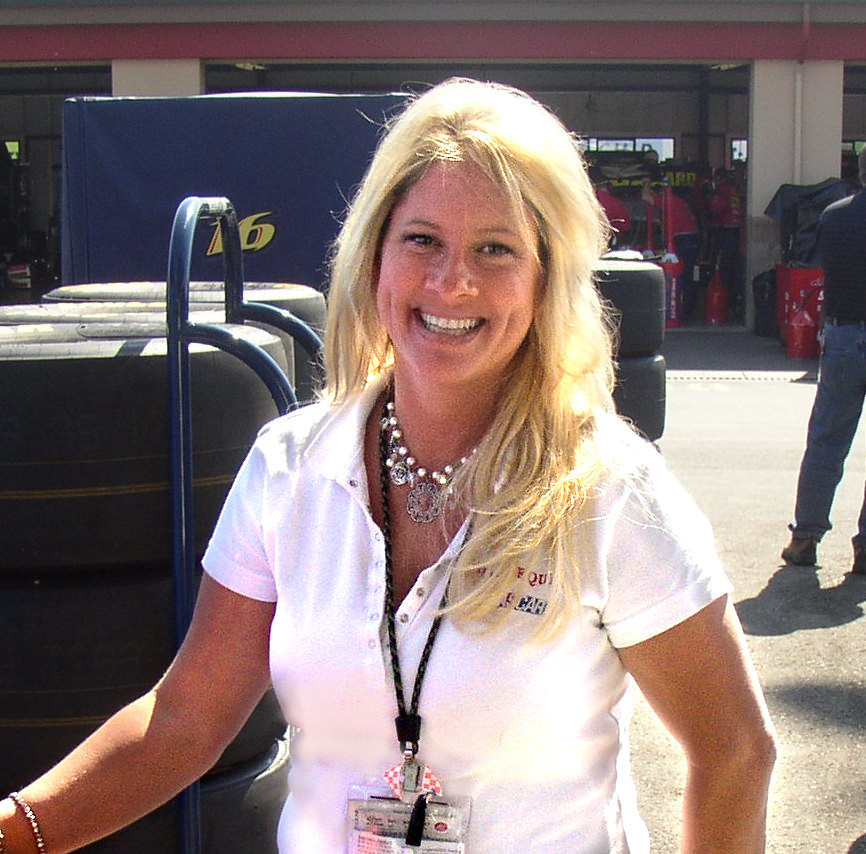
- Britton in 2006
- Born: Pamela Britton
- Occupation: Author
- Writing career
- Genres: Romance, Non-fiction
- Website: www.pamelabritton.com

Pamela Britton is an American author of romance novels. In addition to writing novels, she is a freelance journalist for the Quarter Horse JQURNAL. Her non-fiction work is written under the name Pamela Britton-Baer. She is best known for being the first author to secure NASCAR licensing for her works of fiction.

== Early career ==
Britton was discovered through Bantam/Doubleday/Dell's "Diamond Debut" contest for unpublished writers (1997) as well as Romance Writers of America's prestigious "Golden Heart" (1998). She didn't win either contest, but one of the judging editors offered her a publishing contract based on the strength of her work. Her debut novel, My Fallen Angel (HarperCollins), was released in 2000, but it was her fourth book, Seduced (Warner), a Regency-era romance, that launched her career. Publishers Weekly called it, "[A] delightful tale [that] outshines many romances of its ilk," and Booklist gave it a starred review. The book went on to secure awards and accolades, Barnes & Noble naming it one of the best romance novels of 2003.

Britton's fifth book, Tempted (Warner), also secured positive reviews and another nod from Barnes & Noble in 2004. Her sixth book, Scandal (Warner), was her final work of historical fiction. In 2005, Britton turned her attention to writing single-title contemporary romance. Her first entry, Dangerous Curves (HQN/Harlequin), was at the forefront of the sports romance genre, specifically, her stories were centered around stock car racing. Her work came to the attention of NASCAR who signed her publisher to a licensing agreement in 2005, the first of its kind. Britton's 11th novel carried the official NASCAR logo. Titled In the Groove (HQN, 2006) it subsequently appeared on the front page of USA Today and within the pages of Sports Illustrated, Entertainment Weekly, and Southwest Airlines’ Spirit Magazine. Celebrities such as Jay Leno, Keith Olbermann, and Stephen Colbert spotlighted the book on their show.

== Present day ==
Britton stepped away from writing NASCAR books in 2008, but she continues to write. To date she has written 50 books for various publishers. She is working on her 51st, a young adult romance centered around the world of horse shows.

== Books ==
- My Fallen Angel (HarperCollins/2000)
- Enchanted by Your Kisses (HarperCollins/2001)
- Cowboy Lessons (Harlequin/2004)
- Seduced (Warner-Hachette/2004)
- Tempted (Warner-Hachette2004)
- Scandal (Warner-Hachette2004)
- Cowboy Trouble (Harelquin2004)
- Dangerous Curves (HQN/2005)
- Honk if You Love Real Men (St. Martins/2005)
- Red Hot Santa (Ballantine/2005)
- In the Groove (HQH/2006)
- Cowboy M.D. (Harlequin/2006)
- On the Edge (HQN/2006)
- Cowboy Vet (Harlequin/2006)
- To the Limit (HQN/2007)
- The Cowgirl's CEO (Harlequin/2007)
- Total Control (HQN/2007)
- NASCAR Holiday 2 (Harlequin/2007) - Anthology
- On the Move (HQN/2008)
- Slow Burn (HQN/2009)
- The Wrangler (Harlequin/2009)
- Mark, Secret Cowboy (Harlequin/2010)
- Playboy Prankster (Harlequin/2010)
- This Time, Forever (Harlequin/2010)
- Burning Rubber (HQN/2011)
- Rancher and Protector (Harlequin/2011)
- The Rancher's Bride (Harlequin/2012)
- A Cowboy's Pride (Harlequin/2013)
- A Cowboy's Christmas Wedding (Harlequin/2013)
- A Cowboy's Angel - Via Del Caballo Series (Harlequin/2014)
- The Texan's Twins (Harlequin/2014)
- Kissed by a Cowboy - Via Del Caballo Series (Harlequin/2015)
- Her Rodeo Hero - Via Del Caballo Series(Harlequin/2015)
- His Rodeo Sweetheart - Via Del Caballo Series (Harlequin/2016)
- The Ranger's Rodeo Rebel - Via Del Caballo Series (Harlequin/2016)
- Her Cowboy Lawman - Via Del Caballo Series (Harlequin/2017)
- Winning the Rancher's Heart (Sequel to Her Cowboy Lawman - Also features a secondary character from His Rodeo Sweetheart) (Harlequin/2017)
- Rodeo Legends: Shane (Harlequin/March 2018)
- Home on the Ranch: Rodeo Legend

(Harlequin/January 2019)

- Home on the Ranch: Her Cowboy Hero

(Harlequin)

- Home on the Ranch: The Rancher’s Surprise (Harlequin)
- Home on the Ranch: The Cowboy’s Dilemma (Harlequin)
- Walker: The Rodeo Legend

(Harlequin)
