= Linda Britten =

Australian fashion designer

Linda Britten is an Australian-born fashion designer based in Melbourne, Australia. She has been a name in the fashion world since the 1970s, and has developed several labels, trading under the brand "Linda Britten" and others. Britten is particularly renowned for her elegant and sophisticated couture evening wear and wedding gowns.

== History ==
Melbourne-born designer Linda Britten began her career upon graduating from the Royal Melbourne Institute of Technology in 1968. Following hard on her graduation, Noleen King, one of the top fashion labels of the time, seized the aspiring young designer and employed her, marking her successful introduction into the world of fashion. After two years building a profile at Noleen King, Britten left the label to work for the clothing company Tiffany where she was commissioned at the young age of 21 to create and develop the label "Jellibeen".

Once Britten had made a success of Jellibeen, she began freelancing for well known designers such as Kenneth Pirrie. At the same time Britten was busy building up her business, working to develop a label of her own. Soon, Britten was creating and trading under her popular daywear brand "Anna Seed", which was sold in stores such as Myer and Georges.

Britten opened her first shop in Hampton in the mid 1970s, and then another in Chapel Street She began developing and trading under her own name, "Linda Britten", in 1978, creating a line of up-market couture and eveningwear. Many of her designs were inspired by lace, and increasingly people adopted her couture as alternative wedding gowns.

Accordingly, the next shop that Britten initiated was bridal. The shop, opening in 1980 in South Yarra, was heralded as Australia’s very first contemporary bridal store. Myer, David Jones, and other department stores quickly moved the label as a concept store, which continued to be one of the most sought after labels of the 1980s. That same year Britten was recognised for her talent and initiative, receiving the award of Australian Fashion Designer of the Year.

In the 1990s, working in conjunction with the Qantas Holidays partnership, Britten launched a new project, the “Designer Honeymoon Collection”, which coincided with her wedding gown initiative. The “Linda Britten” Honeymoon package was developed in Fiji, Hawaii, Bali and other honeymoon destinations.

Upon exhibiting in Japan in the World Trade Fashion Exhibition in the late 1990s, the large Japanese bridal company Watabe approached Britten with a proposition for a project that was to span several years. “Linda Britten Japanese Wedding Blessings”, a wedding package for Japanese tourists, was created. The package put together weddings for tourists looking to be married in Australia, including wedding gowns and clothing designed by Britten herself. The project was taken on by the Australian Tourism Commission, who worked to bring engaged Japanese tourists exclusively to Melbourne, marking Britten’s foray into tourism and export.

Today, Britten continues to design couture evening and bridal wear, in addition to her LBD (Little Black Dress) collections. She later revived her original label, Anna Seed, in collaboration with her sons Alex and Tim—both fashion designers—with the aim of relaunching the brand for a contemporary market.
