= Brittain, Akron, Ohio =

Settlement in the United States

Coordinates: 41°03′52″N 81°27′47″W

Brittain was a small settlement in Ohio. Founded in 1832, it was part of the township of Springfield until it was absorbed by Akron.

It sat east of Akron at the crossroads of roads from Tallmadge (north), Mogadore (east), North Springfield (south) and Middlebury (west), 1,066 feet above sea level. The Little Cuyahoga River ran through Brittain and was joined by Springfield lake Outlet Creek on its outskirts.

The area may have been a settlement area for indigenous Americans when the John T. Brittain family arrived in 1832. Among the early settlers was Benjamin Hilbish, who farmed wheat from 1849, raised a family, and built a home in 1869.

A house built by the Brittain family around 1874 still stands on Brittain Road.

In 1892, Sheriff Alanson Lane wrote, "Brittain (formerly for many years known as "White Grocery" [after its clean streets and several grocers]), one mile east of the city limits, on the Mogadore road, has had a hotel or two, store, post office, school house, wagon shop, blacksmith shop, clay-mill, etc., with private residences to correspond."

In 1910, Brittain had a one-room school house, a post office, a Methodist church, hotels, clay mill, blacksmith, and a grist mill. The Roegers family had a carriage manufacturing workshop. A sawmill at Oak Hill sat on the Little Cuyahoga River.

As Akron absorbed Middlebury to the west, and then spread into Brittain, several parts were lost to urban sprawl. After World War II. the interstate highway project built a highway over most of what was left of Brittain.

Brittain Road in Akron is named after the village. Most of what was once the Village of Brittain is at the current intersections of East Market and Mogadore Road in Akron, in the Ellet school cluster.
