= Michelangelo Console =

Italian botanist (1812–1897)

- Born: 24 July 1812; Palermo, Italy
- Died: 13 May 1897 (aged 84); Palermo, Italy
- Occupation: Botanist
- Known for: Research on the Cactaceae

Michelangelo Console (Palermo, 24 July 1812 – Palermo, 13 May 1897) was an Italian botanist primarily known for his work on cacti.

== Life and work ==
Michelangelo Console was professor of botany at the Palermo Botanical Garden, where he worked with French botanist Charles Antoine Lemaire. Console described the cactus genus Myrtillocactus in 1897, shortly before his death.

Charles Antoine Lemaire named the cactus genus Consolea in honor of Console.

== Selected works ==
- Su taluni casi morfologici nella famiglia delle Cactaceae. In: Il Naturalista siciliano. Palermo 1883, p. 78–79, Online
- Myrtillocactus, nuovo genere di Cactaceae. In: Bollettino del Reale Orto Botanico di Palermo. Vol. 1, No. 1, 1897, p. 8–10.
