= John Britton (martyr) =

English Catholic martyr

Blessed John Britton
- Born: Barnsley, South Yorkshire
- Died: 1 April 1598; York
- Venerated in: Catholic Church
- Beatified: 22 November 1987, Rome by Pope John Paul II

John Britton (Bretton) (died 1 April 1598) was an English Catholic martyr from Barnsley, Yorkshire, who was executed during the reign of Elizabeth I. He was beatified in 1987.

== Biography ==
A member of the old, established Bretton family, near Barnsley in Yorkshire, Britton was a devout Catholic. Known as a zealous Catholic, he was subjected to continual vexations and persecutions, which caused him to absent himself from his wife and family for safety. As an old man, he was accused of making traitorous speeches against the queen and condemned to death. He refused to renounce his faith, and was executed at York on 1 April 1598. He was probably the father of Matthew Britton, prefect and professor at Douai in 1599.
