= Wilton Everett Britton =

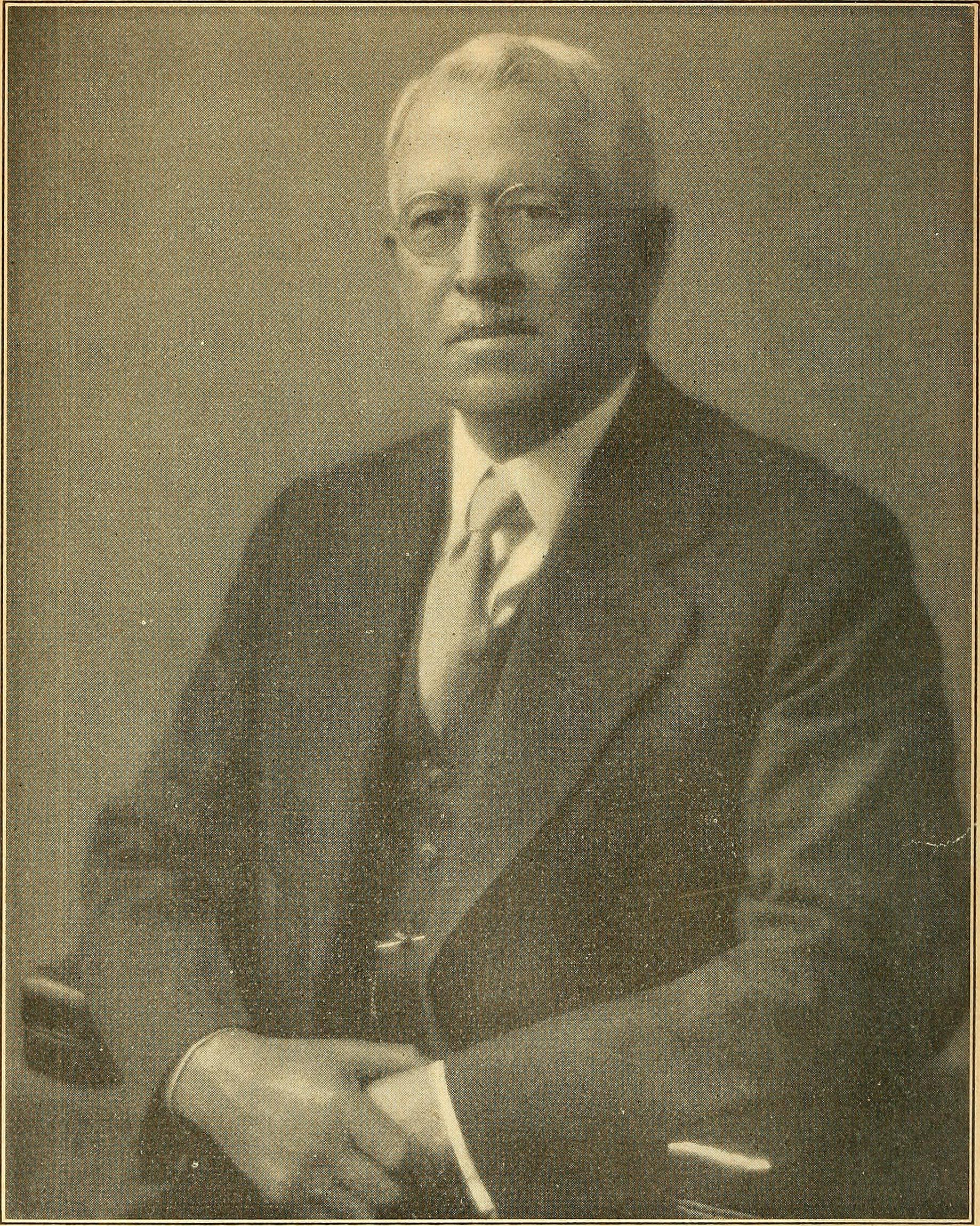
Britton in 1901

Wilton Everett Britton (18 September 1868 – 15 February 1939) was an American entomologist and botanist who worked in the Connecticut State Geological and Natural History Survey. He was also involved in establishing entomology at the Connecticut Agricultural Experiment Station.

== Life and work ==
Britton was born in Marlborough, Massachusetts, and grew up on a farm in Gilsum, New Hampshire. He received a BSc degree from New Hampshire College of Agriculture and the Mechanic Arts (1893) and a doctorate from Yale University (1903). He later received an honorary DSc from the University of New Hampshire in 1930. He worked at the Connecticut Agricultural Experiment Station at New Haven from 1894. In 1901 he became State Entomologist and also taught entomology at Yale University. From 1925 he was superintendent of the State Geological and Natural History Survey. He edited the Journal of Economic Entomology (1910-1929) and indexed the contents of American Economic Entomology (1905-1934). He was a Fellow of the Entomological Society of America, member of the National Malaria Committee and numerous other organizations. He served as a director of the New Haven Public Library.

Britton studied the insect fauna of Connecticut and also worked on economically important insects including the San Jose scale and the gypsy moth.

Britton married Bertha Madeline Perkins in 1895. They had no children.
