= John Britton (mathematician) =

John Leslie Britton (18 November 1927 – 13 June 1994) was an English mathematician from Yorkshire who worked in combinatorial group theory and was an expert on the word problem for groups. Britton was a member of the London Mathematical Society and was Secretary of Meetings and Membership with that organization from 1973 to 1976.

Britton died in a climbing accident on the Isle of Skye.
