= Britain (place name) =

Place name

- Britannia, Βρεττανικήν
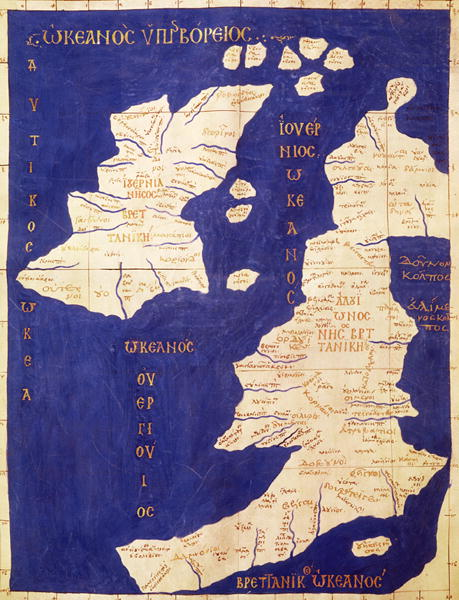
- Britain (Βρεττανικήν) as it appears in Ptolemy's Geography
- Region: British Isles

The name Britain originates from the Common Brittonic term Pritanī and is one of the oldest known names for Great Britain, an island off the north-western coast of continental Europe. The terms Briton and British, similarly derived, refer to some or all of its inhabitants and, to varying extents, those of the smaller islands in the vicinity. "British Isles" is the only ancient name for these islands to survive in general usage.

== Etymology ==
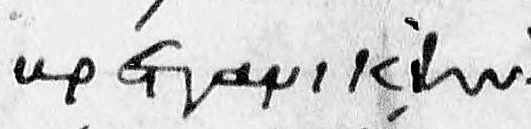
Britain (Βρεττανικήν) as it appears in Strabo's Geographica, from an 11th century manuscript

"Britain" comes from Latin: Britannia~Brittania, via Old French Bretaigne and Middle English Breteyne, possibly influenced by Old English Bryten(lond), probably also from Latin Brittania, ultimately an adaptation of the Common Brittonic name for the island, *Pritanī.

The earliest written reference to the British Isles derives from the works of the Greek explorer Pytheas of Massalia; later Greek writers such as Diodorus of Sicily and Strabo who quote Pytheas' use of variants such as Πρεττανική (Prettanikē), "The Britannic [land, island]", and Brettanikō̃n nḗsōn, "Britannic islands", with *Pretani being a Celtic word that might mean literally "the painted ones" or "the tattooed folk", referring to body decoration (see below).

The modern Welsh name for the island is (Ynys) Prydain. This may demonstrate that the original Common Brittonic form had initial P- not B- (which would give **Brydain) and -t- not -tt- (else **Prythain). This may be explained as containing a stem *prit- (Welsh pryd, Old Irish cruith; Proto-Celtic *kwrit-), meaning literally shape or form, combined with an adjectival suffix. This leaves us with *Pritanī.

== History ==
=== Written record ===
The first known written use of the word was an ancient Greek transliteration of the original P-Celtic term. It first appeared within a periplus written in the circa 320s BC by the geographer and explorer Pytheas of Massalia, but no copies of this work survive. The earliest existing records of the word are quotations of the periplus by later authors, such as those within Diodorus of Sicily's history (c. 60 BC to 30 BC), Strabo's Geographica (c. 7 BC to AD 19) and Pliny's Natural History (AD 77). According to Strabo, Pytheas referred to Britain as Bretannikē, which is treated as a feminine noun. Although technically an adjective (the Britannic or British) it may have been a case of noun ellipsis, a common mechanism in ancient Greek. This term along with other relevant ones, subsequently appeared inter alia in the following works:

- Pliny referred to the main island as Britannia, with Britanniae describing the island group.
- Catullus also used the plural Britanniae in his Carmina.
- Avienius used insula Albionum in his Ora Maritima.
- Orosius used the plural Britanniae to refer to the islands and Britanni to refer to the people thereof.
- Diodorus referred to Great Britain as Prettanikē nēsos and its inhabitants as Prettanoi.
- Ptolemy, in his Almagest, used Brettania and Brettanikai nēsoi to refer to the island group and the terms megale Brettania (Great Britain) and mikra Brettania (little Britain) for the islands of Great Britain and Ireland, respectively. However, in his Geography, he referred to both Alwion (Great Britain) and Iwernia (Ireland) as a nēsos Bretanikē, or British island.
- Marcian of Heraclea, in his Periplus maris exteri, described the island group as αί Πρεττανικαί νήσοι (the Prettanic Isles).
- Stephanus of Byzantium used the term Ἀλβίων (Albion) to refer to the island, and Ἀλβιώνιοι (Albionioi) to refer to its people.
- Pseudo-Aristotle used nēsoi Brettanikai, Albion and Ierne to refer to the island group, Great Britain, and Ireland, respectively.
- Procopius, in the 6th century AD, used the terms Brittia and Brettania though he considered them to be different islands, the former being located between the latter and Thule. Moreover, according to him on Brittia lived three different nations, the homonymous Brittones (Britons), the Angiloi (English) and the Phrissones (Frisians).

As seen above, the original spelling of the term is disputed. Ancient manuscripts alternated between the use of the P- and the B-, and many linguists believe Pytheas's original manuscript used P- (Prettania) rather than B-. Although B- is more common in these manuscripts, many modern authors quote the Greek or Latin with a P- and attribute the B- to changes by the Romans in the time of Julius Caesar; the relevant, attested sometimes later, change of the spelling of the word(s) in Greek, as is also sometimes done in modern Greek, from being written with a double tau to being written with a double nu, is likewise also explained by Roman influence, from the aforementioned change in the spelling in Latin. For example, linguist Karl Schmidt states that the "name of the island was originally transmitted as Πρεττανία (with Π instead of Β) ... as is confirmed by its etymology".

Stephanus, epitomising Markianos and an early lost recension of Ptolemy, states

"Καὶ ἄλλοι οὕτως διὰ του π Πρετανίδες νῆσοι, ὡς Μαρκιανὸς καὶ Πτολεμαῖος."

However, the tradition of the Geographica preserved within the stemma of surviving (13th–14th century) manuscripts only preserves "Β" and not "Π" recensions of "Βρεττανικήσ".

According to Barry Cunliffe:

It is quite probable that the description of Britain given by the Greek writer Diodorus Siculus in the first century BC derives wholly or largely from Pytheas. What is of particular interest is that he calls the island "Pretannia" (Greek "Prettanikē"), that is "the island of the Pretani, or Priteni". "Pretani" is a Celtic word that probably means "the painted ones" or "the tattooed folk", referring to body decoration – a reminder of Caesar's observations of woad-painted barbarians. In all probability the word "Pretani" is an ethnonym (the name by which the people knew themselves), but it remains an outside possibility that it was their continental neighbours who described them thus to the Greek explorers.

=== Roman period ===
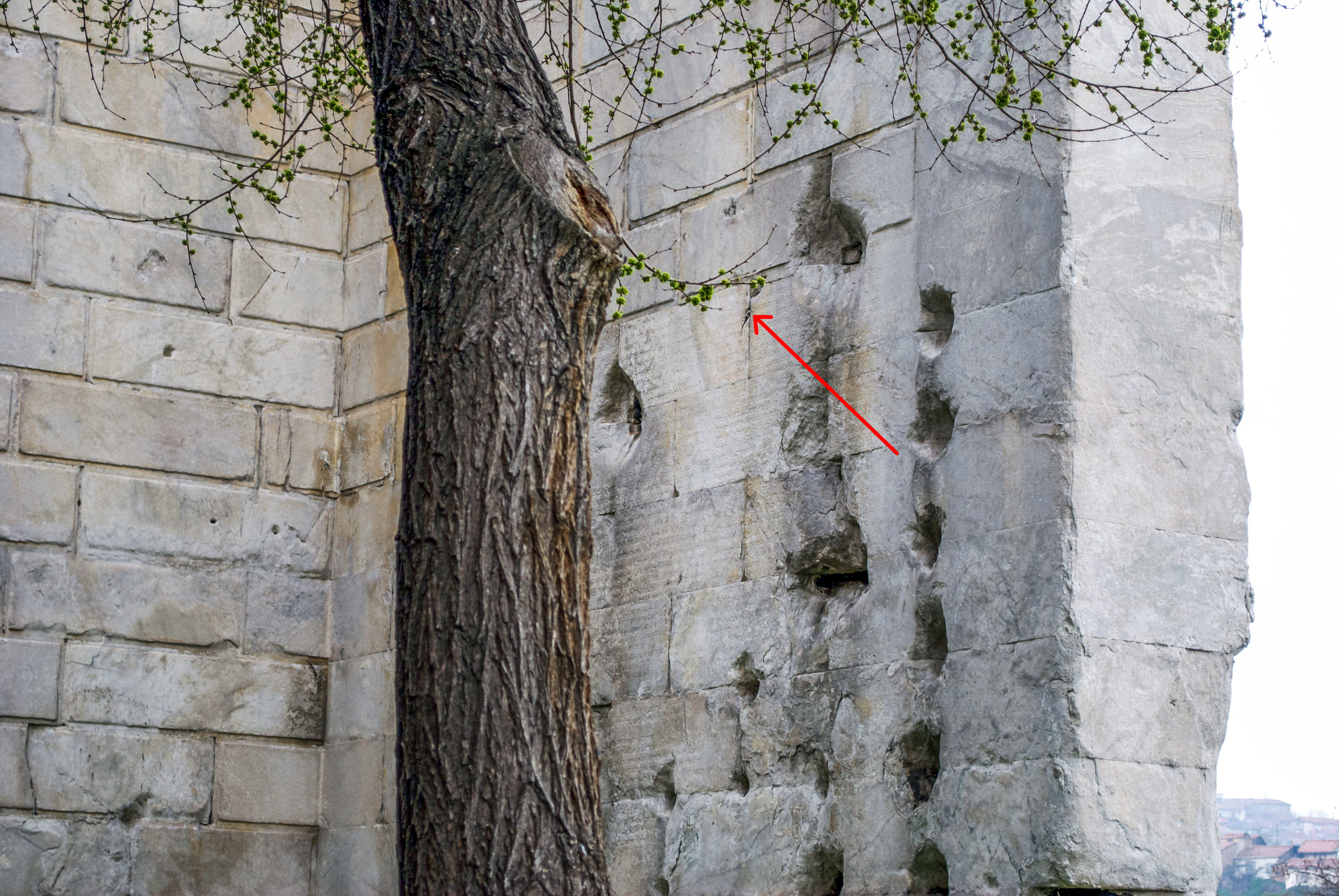
South wall of the pronaos of the Temple of Augustus and Rome in Ankara, sporting the Monumentum Ancyranum of the Res Gestae Divi Augusti. The section relating to Britain is annotated.

Following Julius Caesar's expeditions to the island in 55 and 54 BC, Brit(t)an(n)ia was predominantly used to refer simply to the island of Great Britain. After the Roman conquest under the Emperor Claudius in AD 43, it came to be used to refer to the Roman province of Britain (later two provinces), which at one stage consisted of part of the island of Great Britain south of Hadrian's Wall.

The earliest surviving contemporary written mention of Britain is found in the inscription of the Res Gestae Divi Augusti at the Temple of Augustus and Rome in Ankara:

... ad me supplices confugerunt reges ... Britannorum Dumnobellanus et Tincomarus

Translation:

Kings sought refuge with me as suppliants ... including Dumnobellanunus and Tincomarus of the Britons

=== Medieval ===
In Old English or Anglo-Saxon, the Graeco-Latin term referring to Britain entered in the form of Bryttania, as attested by Alfred the Great's translation of Orosius' Seven Books of History Against the Pagans.

The Latin name Britannia re-entered the language through the Old French Bretaigne. The use of Britons for the inhabitants of Great Britain is derived from the Old French bretun, the term for the people and language of Brittany, itself derived from Latin and Greek, e.g. the Βρίττωνες of Procopius. It was introduced into Middle English as brutons in the late 13th century.

== Modern usage ==
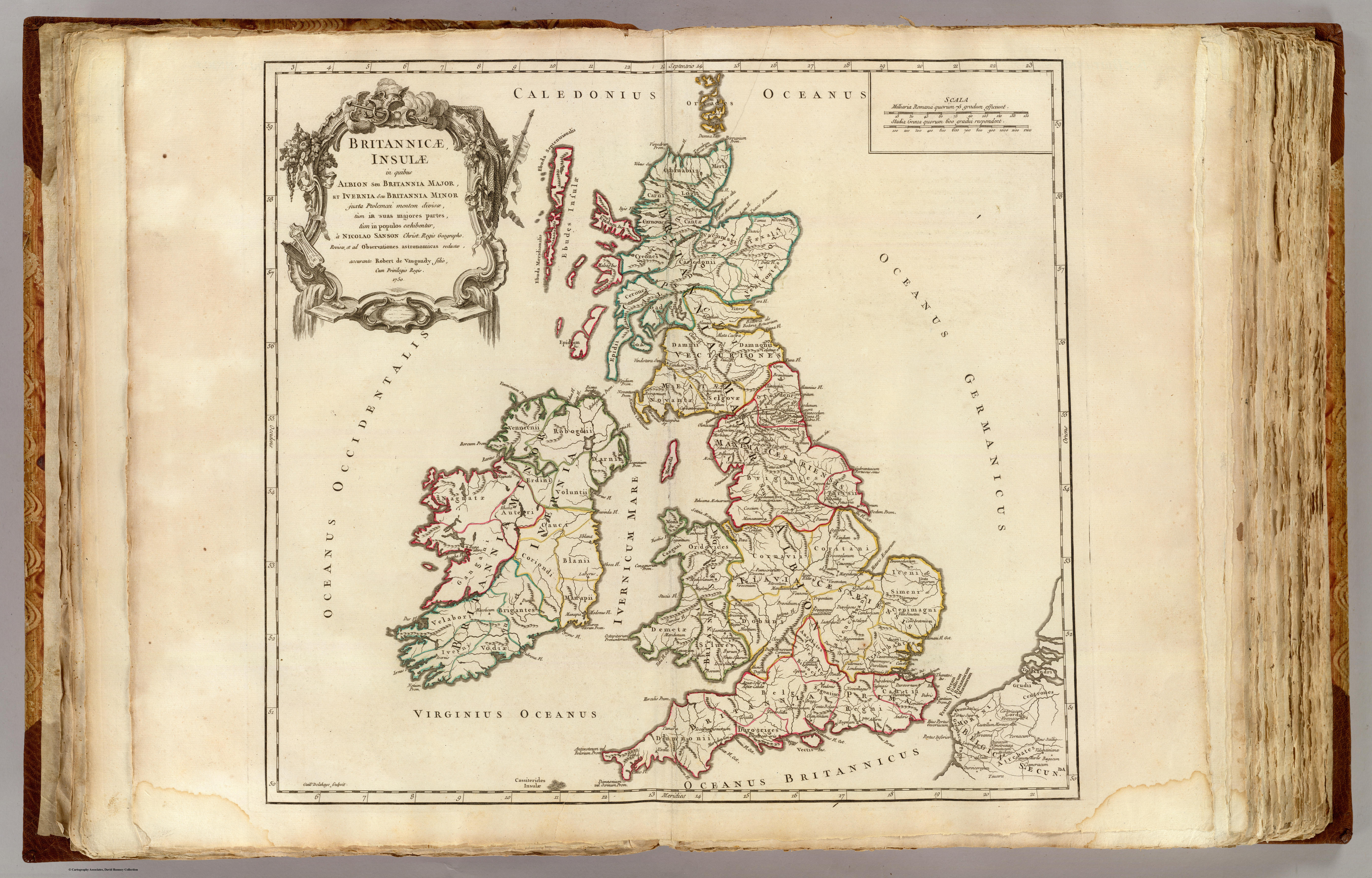
“Brittanicae Insulae” by Didier Robert de Vaugondy, 1750

There is much conflation of the terms United Kingdom, Great Britain, Britain, and England today, especially among English speakers outside Great Britain and Ireland. In many ways, accepted usage allows some of these to overlap, but some common usages are incorrect.

The term Britain is widely used as a common name for the sovereign state of the United Kingdom, or UK for short. The United Kingdom includes three countries on the largest island, which can be called the island of Britain or Great Britain: these are England, Scotland and Wales. However the United Kingdom also includes Northern Ireland on the neighbouring island of Ireland, the remainder of which is not part of the United Kingdom. England is not synonymous with Britain, Great Britain, or United Kingdom.

The classical writer Ptolemy referred to the larger island as great Britain (megale Bretannia) and to Ireland as little Britain (mikra Brettania) in his work, Almagest (147–148 AD). In his later work, Geography (c. 150 AD), he gave these islands the names Ἀλουίωνος (Alwiōnos), Ἰουερνίας (Iwernias), and Mona (the Isle of Anglesey), suggesting these may have been native names of the individual islands not known to him at the time of writing Almagest. The name Albion appears to have fallen out of use sometime after the Roman conquest of Great Britain, after which Britain became the more commonplace name for the island called Great Britain.

After the Anglo-Saxon period, Britain was used as a historical term only. Geoffrey of Monmouth in his pseudohistorical Historia Regum Britanniae (c. 1136) refers to the island of Great Britain as Britannia major ("Greater Britain"), to distinguish it from Britannia minor ("Lesser Britain"), the continental region which approximates to modern Brittany, which had been settled in the fifth and sixth centuries by Celtic migrants from the British Isles. The term Great Britain was first used officially in 1474, in the instrument drawing up the proposal for a marriage between Cecily the daughter of Edward IV of England, and James the son of James III of Scotland, which described it as "this Nobill Isle, callit Gret Britanee". It was used again in 1603, when King James VI and I styled himself "King of Great Britain" on his coinage.

The term Great Britain later served to distinguish the large island of Britain from the French region of Brittany (in French Grande-Bretagne and Bretagne respectively). With the Acts of Union 1707 it became the official name of the new state created by the union of the Kingdom of England (which then included Wales) with the Kingdom of Scotland, forming the Kingdom of Great Britain. In 1801, the name of the country was changed to United Kingdom of Great Britain and Ireland, recognising that Ireland had ceased to be a distinct kingdom and, with the Acts of Union 1800, had become incorporated into the union. After Irish independence in the early 20th century, the name was changed to United Kingdom of Great Britain and Northern Ireland, which is still the official name.

In contemporary usage, Great Britain, while synonymous with the island of Britain, and capable of being used to refer politically to England, Scotland and Wales in combination, is sometimes used as a loose synonym for the United Kingdom as a whole. For example, the term Team GB and Great Britain were used to refer to the United Kingdom's Olympic team in 2012 although this included Northern Ireland. The usage 'GBR' in this context is determined by the International Olympic Committee (see List of IOC country codes) which accords with the international standard ISO 3166. The internet country code, ".uk" is an anomaly, being the only Country code top-level domain that does not follow ISO 3166.

== See also ==
- Glossary of names for the British
- Terminology of the British Isles
- Hibernia
- Cruthin
- Prydain
- Pytheas
