= McCaulley =

McCaulley may refer to:

- Mariana McCaulley (1890–1946), American epigrapher and Latin teacher
- McCaulley, Texas, an unincorporated community in Fisher County, Texas, United States

== See also ==
- McCauley (disambiguation)
