= Res Gestae (disambiguation) =

Res Gestae is Latin term meaning "things done", and may refer to:

- Res gestae, a legal term in American jurisprudence and English law

The term appears in titles of works recording the accomplishments of certain people, including:

- Res Gestae Divi Augusti, the funerary inscription of the Roman emperor Augustus
- Various other "Res Gestae" inscriptions scattered across the former Roman Empire
- Res Gestae Divi Saporis, a name given by some Western scholars to the Shapur I's inscription at the Ka'ba-ye Zartosht
- "Res gestae of Darius", sometimes used to refer to the Behistun Inscription
- Res gestae Saxonicae sive annalium libri tres, or The Deeds of the Saxons
- Res gestae Alexandri Macedonis or Res gestae Alexandri Magni, a work translated by Julius Valerius Alexander Polemius
- Res gestae (Ammianus Marcellinus), a work of Ammianus Marcellinus
