= Mariana McCaulley =

American epigrapher and Latin teacher

- Mariana McCaulley c. 1919
- Born: 1890
- Died: December 26, 1946 (aged 55–56); Bryn Mawr, Pennsylvania, U.S.
- Other name: Mariana VanDeventer
- Occupations: Epigrapher and Latin teacher

Mariana McCaulley (1890 – December 26, 1946) was an American epigrapher and Latin teacher.

== Biography ==
McCaulley published a 1912 M.A. thesis at Cornell University on a squeeze of the Monumentum Ancyranum (a copy of the Res Gestae Divi Augusti), which obtained positive results in comparing the squeeze against published texts of the inscription and examining its "apices, paragraph-marks and word-division". While at Cornell, she was an advocate for women's suffrage and a member of Kappa Kappa Gamma. During World War I, she served as a canteen worker with the YMCA in France, and afterwards became a member of the Women's Overseas Service League. She later taught Latin at Camden High School, Frankford High School, and the University of Pennsylvania.

== Personal life ==
McCaulley was born in 1890, the daughter of Francis Hervey McCaulley and Lulu McCaulley née Paynter. She married Harry B. VanDeventer in 1927. The couple are recorded in the 1940 US census as living in Lower Merion Township, Montgomery, PA, with their servant Margaret Yeck.
