= Brittia =

Austrasian island

Brittia (Βριττία), according to Procopius, was an island known to the inhabitants of the Low Countries under Frankish rule (viz. the North Sea coast of Austrasia), corresponding both to a real island used for burial and a mythological Isle of the Blessed, to which the souls of the dead are transported.

Procopius's Brittia lies no farther than 200 stadia (25 miles) from the mainland, opposite the mouth of the Rhine but between the islands of Brettania and legendary Thule, and three nations live in it, Angiloi, Phrissones and Brittones, that is, Angles, Frisians and Britons. Procopius mentions a wall in Brittia, which he distinguishes from Bretannia, however, and fertile lands. "It is perhaps only the apparently authentic combinations of names, Angles, Frisians and Britons, which demands hard attention to this interlude in serious Byzantine discussions of the Gothic wars," H. R. Loyn warns. Procopius relates:

They imagine that the souls of the dead are transported to that island. On the coast of the continent there dwell under Frankish sovereignty, but hitherto exempt from all taxation, fishers and farmers, whose duty it is to ferry the souls over. This duty they take in turn. Those to whom it falls on any night, go to bed at dusk; at midnight they hear a knocking at their door, and muffled voices calling. Immediately they rise, go to the shore, and there see empty boats, not their own but strange ones, they go on board and seize the oars. When the boat is under way, they perceive that she is laden choke-full, with her gunwales hardly a finger's breadth above water. Yet they see no one, and in an hour's time they touch land, which one of their own craft would take a day and a night to do. Arrived at Brittia, the boat speedily unloads, and becomes so light that she only dips her keel in the wave. Neither on the voyage nor at landing do they see any one, but they hear a voice loudly asking each one his name and country. Women that have crossed give their husbands' names.

"A garbled account", observed Loyn "possibly an echo of a report by a Frankish ambassador or an Angle in the ambassador's entourage".

Pursuing geographical accuracy beyond the capacity of Procopius himself, there have been suggestions as to at which point exactly these boats left the Gallic coast, Villemarqué placing it near Raz, Armorica, where there is a toponym baie des âmes/boé an anaon "bay of souls".

Jacob Grimm reports that on the river Tréguier in Brittany, in the commune Plouguel, it is "said to be the custom to this day, to convey the dead to the churchyard in a boat, over a small arm of the sea called passage de l'enfer, instead of taking the shorter way by land".

Procopius's account is repeated by John Tzetzes in the 12th century; but long before that, Claudian at the beginning of the 5th had heard of those Gallic shores as a trysting place of flitting ghosts. And not far from that region are Britain, the land of the Senones, and the Rhine. Grimm compares this account to the airy wagon of the Bretons, and to bardic traditions which make out that souls, to reach the underworld, must sail over the pool of dread and of dead bones, across the vale of death, into the sea on whose shore stands open the mouth of hell's abyss.

The name may arise from the Breton name of Brittany, Breizh.

== See also ==
- Breton mythology
- Britain (placename)
- Doggerland
- Fortunate Isles
- Fositesland
- Frankish mythology
- Folklore of the Low Countries
- Tol Eressëa
