= Temple of Augustus and Rome =

Augusteum in Altındağ, Ankara, Turkey

- Augustus Tapınağı
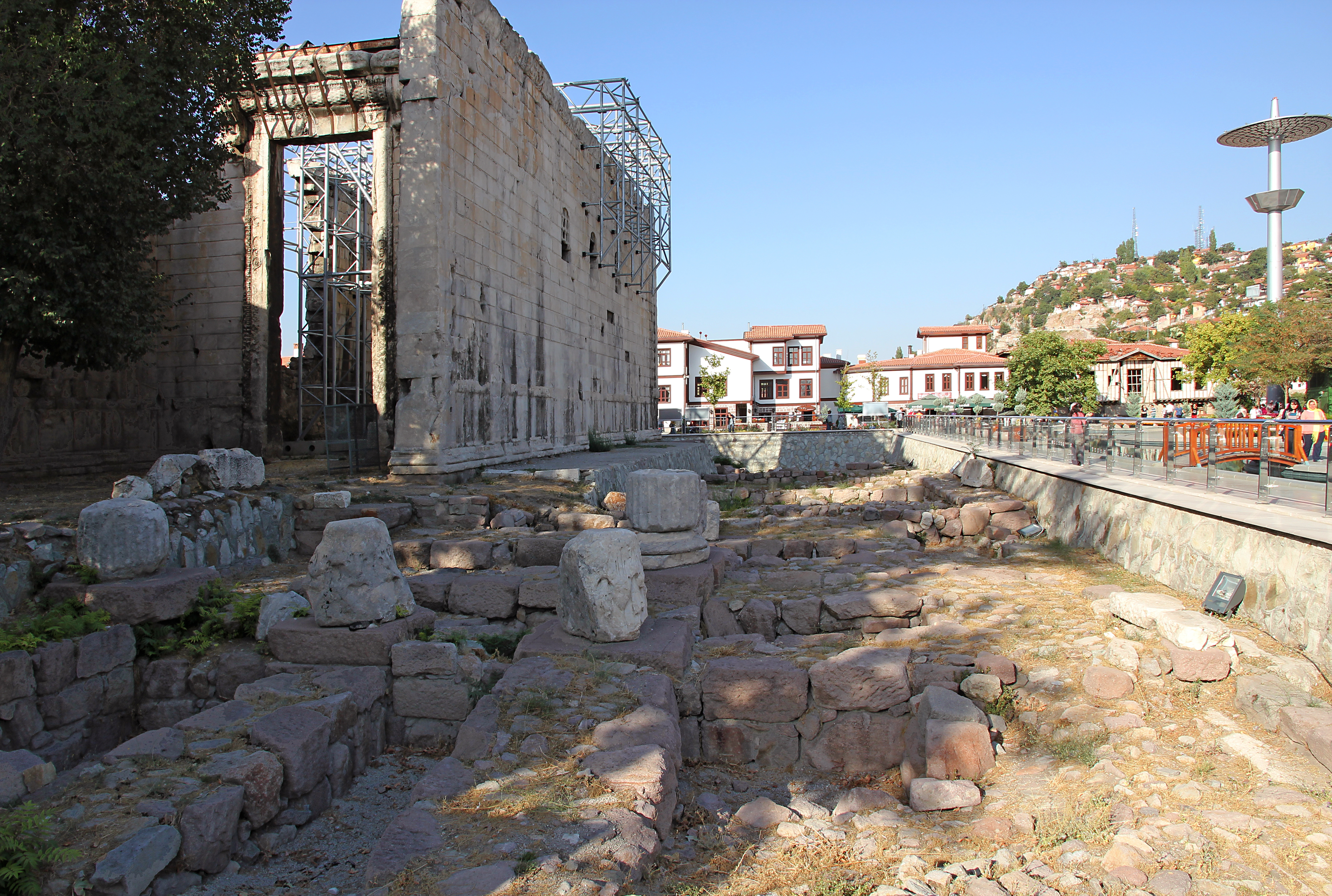

General information
- Type: Augusteum
- Architectural style: Roman Architecture
- Location: Ankara, Turkey
- Coordinates: 39°56′40″N 32°51′30″E

Technical details
- Material: Marble

The Temple of Augustus and Rome is an augusteum located in the Altındağ district of Ankara. It is thought to have been built around 25–20 BC. Besides being one of the most important Roman-period ruins in the city, it is also known for the Monumentum Ancyranum. This is an inscription about the works of Augustus, who was considered the first Roman emperor. It is the most complete copy of Res Gestae Divi Augusti that has survived to the present day, even as the original in Rome had disappeared.

== History ==
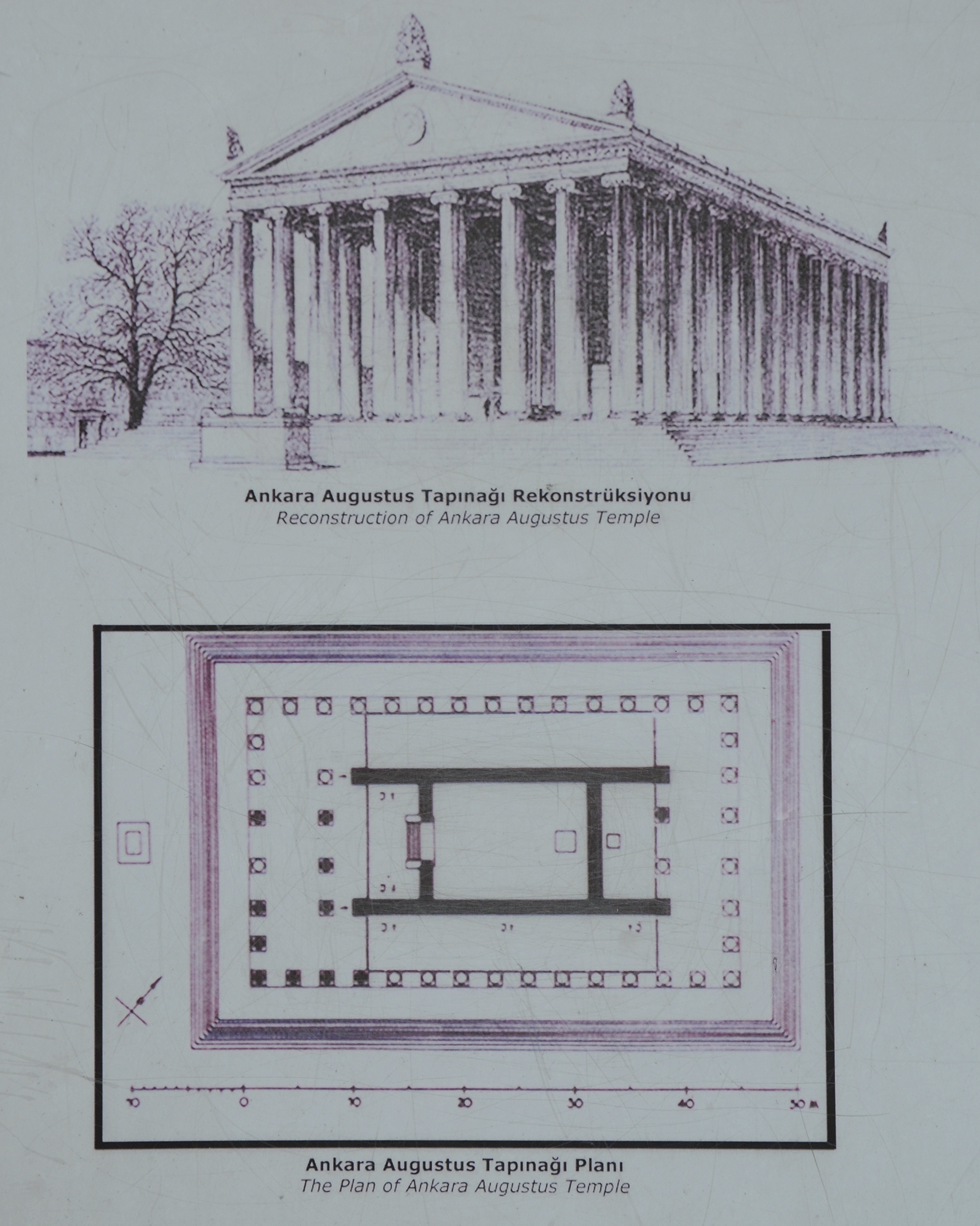
Reconstruction and plan of the Augusteum.

An earlier, 2nd century BCE Phrygian temple on the site was destroyed.

The Augusteum was built between 25–20 BC after the conquest of central Anatolia by the Roman Empire and the formation of the Galatia province, with Ancyra as its administrative capital.

It was reintroduced to the western world by Antun Vrančić, ambassador of Ferdinand of Austria, to the Sultan Suleyman the Magnificent (1555–1562) at Amasia in Asia Minor. Vrančić first read the inscription and identified its origin from his reading of Suetonius. Only the side walls and the ornamented door frame remain; the positions of six columns can still be recognized.

== Monumentum Ancyranum ==
After the death of Augustus in AD 14, a copy of the text of the Res Gestae Divi Augusti was inscribed on both walls inside the pronaos in Latin (beginning on the north wall and finishing on the south) with a Greek translation on an exterior wall of the cella.

The inscriptions are the primary surviving source of the text, since the original inscription on bronze pillars in front of the Mausoleum of Augustus in Rome has long been lost, and two other surviving inscriptions of the text are incomplete. Squeezes of the Monumentum Ancyrum were obtained by the Cornell Expedition in 1907–1908, and have been the basis for epigraphic study including by the epigrapher Mariana McCaulley.

Res Gestae Divi Augusti in the Temple of Augustus and Rome
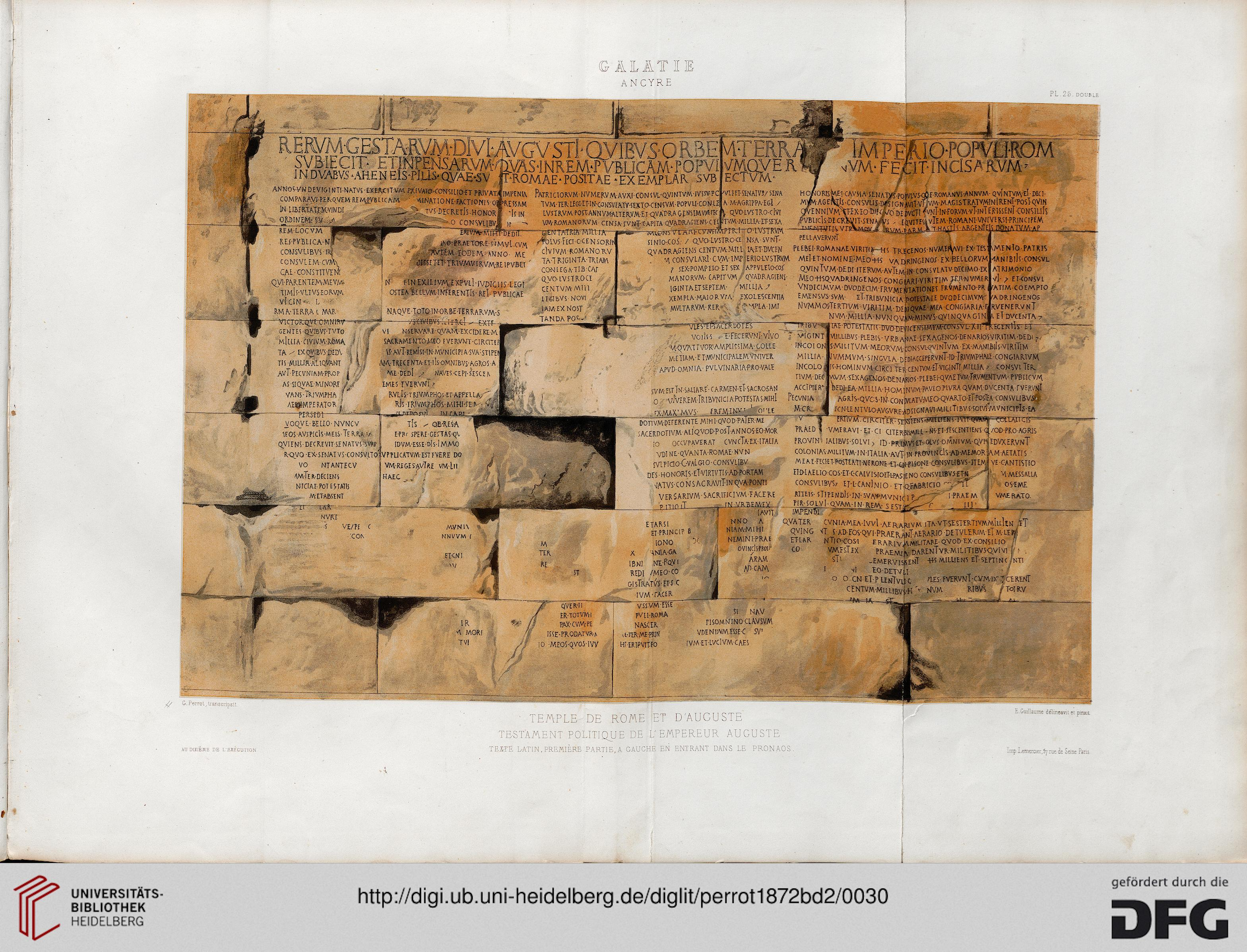
Illustration of the 1st part of the latin Res Gestae on the north wall of the pronaos of the Augusteum.

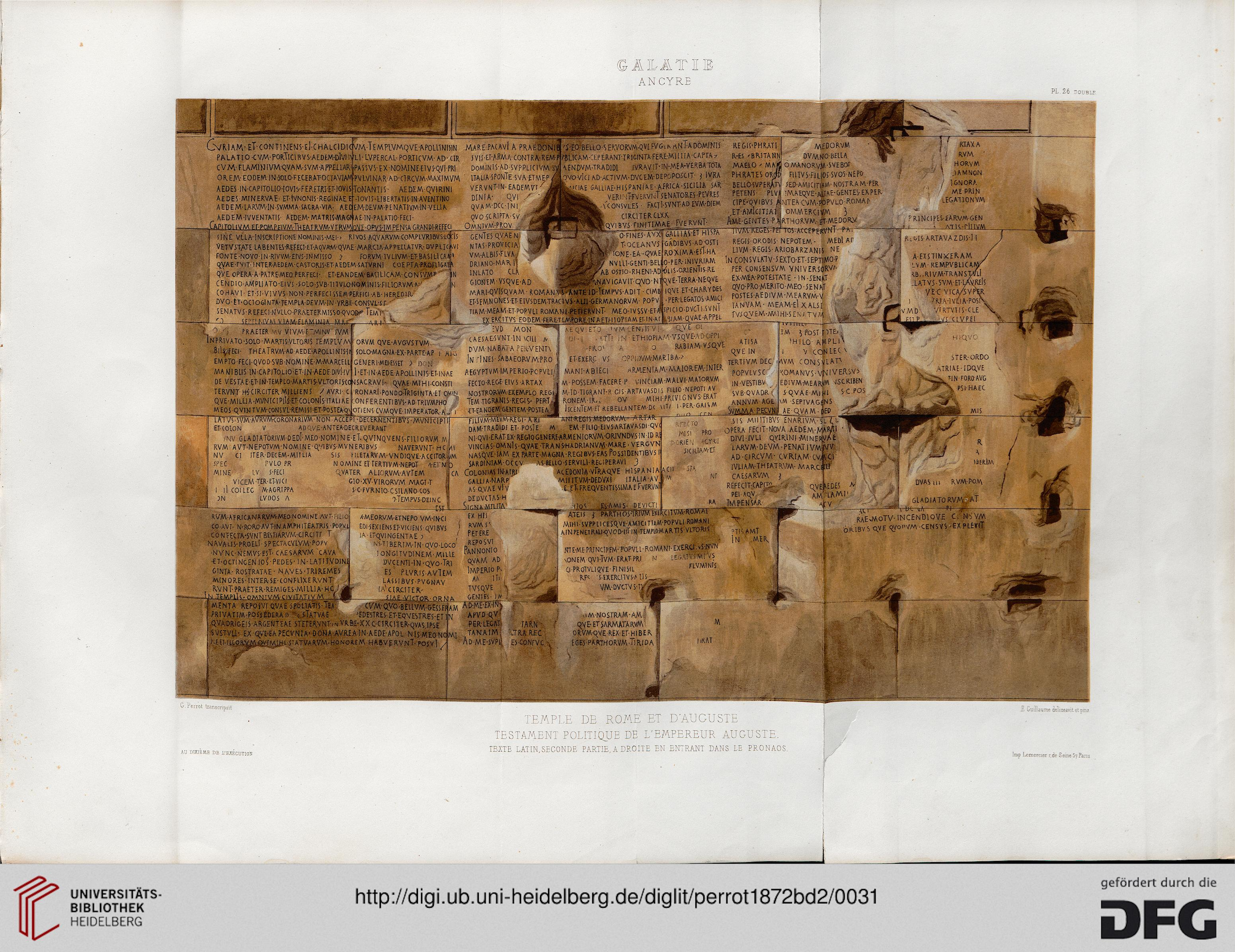
2nd part of the Res Gestae in the Monumentum Ancyranum on the south wall.

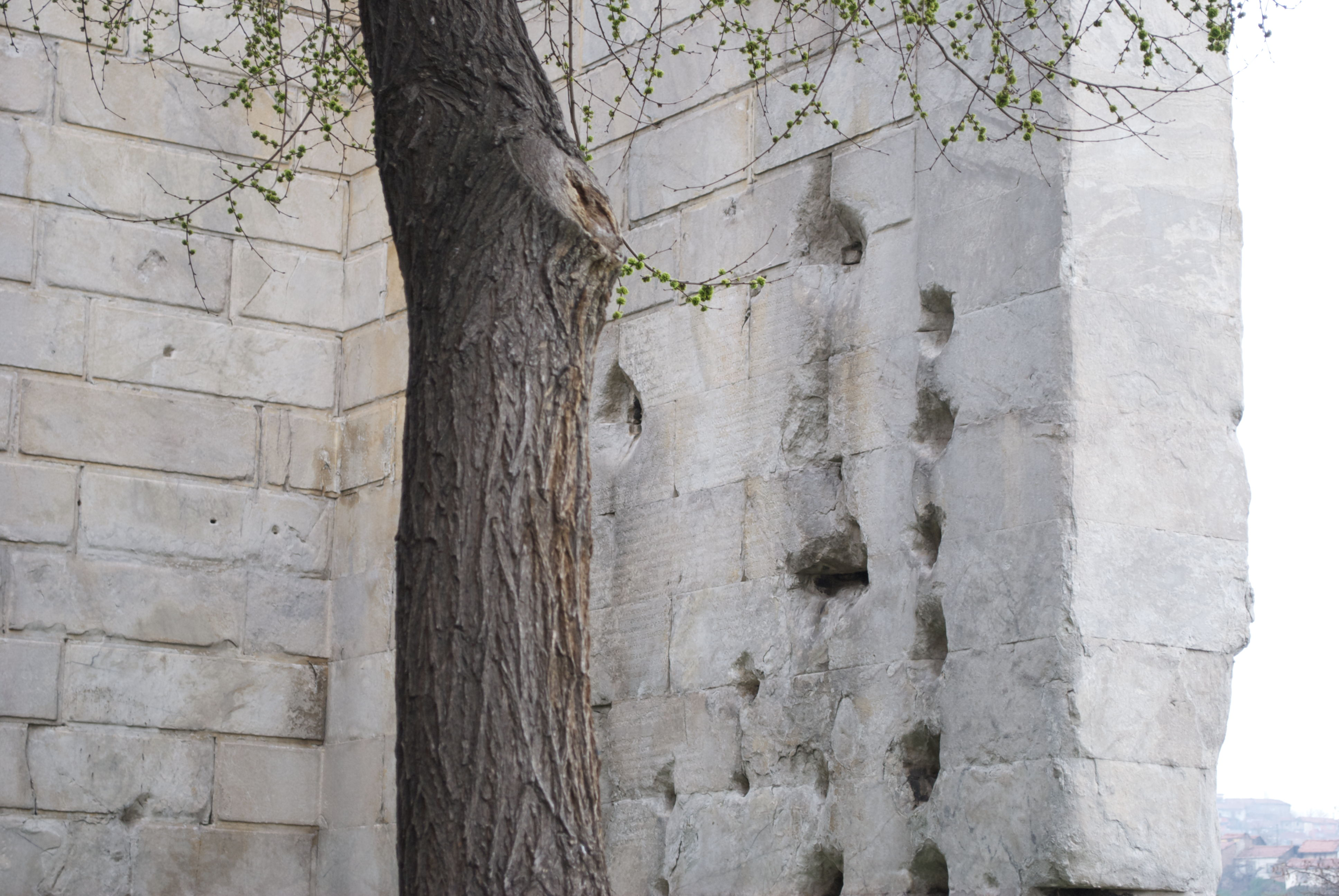
Interior view of the south wall of the pronaos

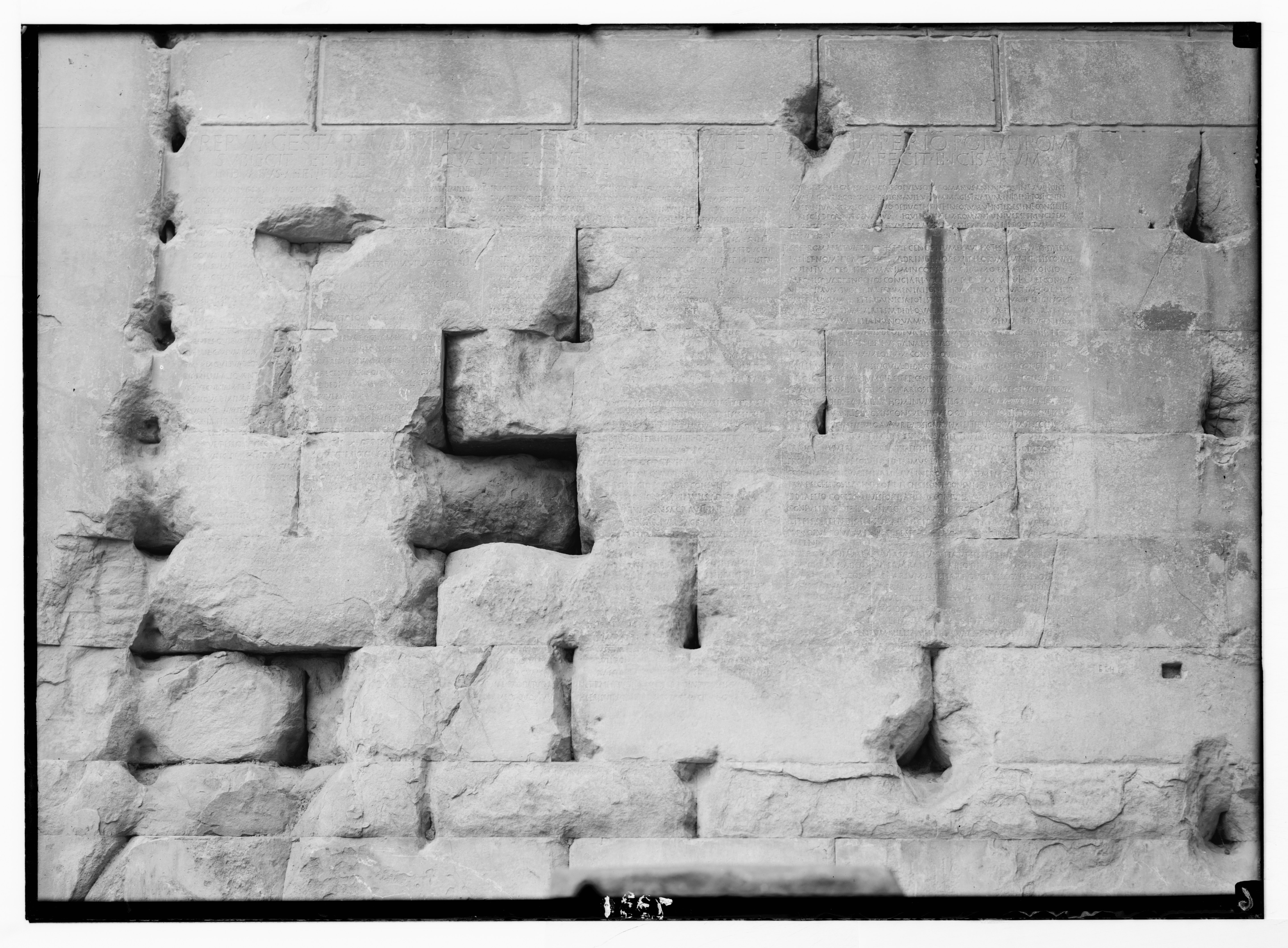
Photograph of the north wall interior.

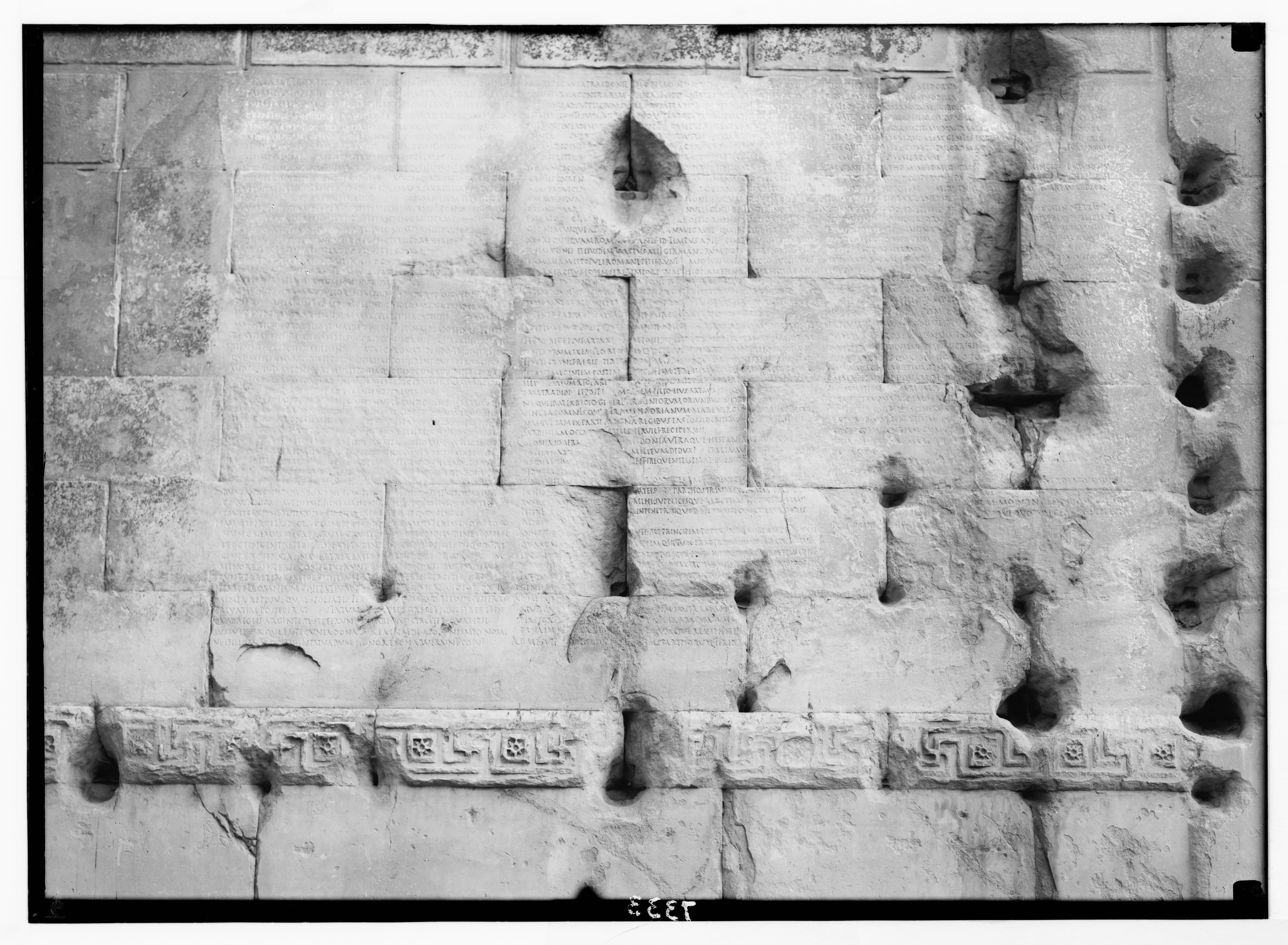
Photograph of the south wall interior.

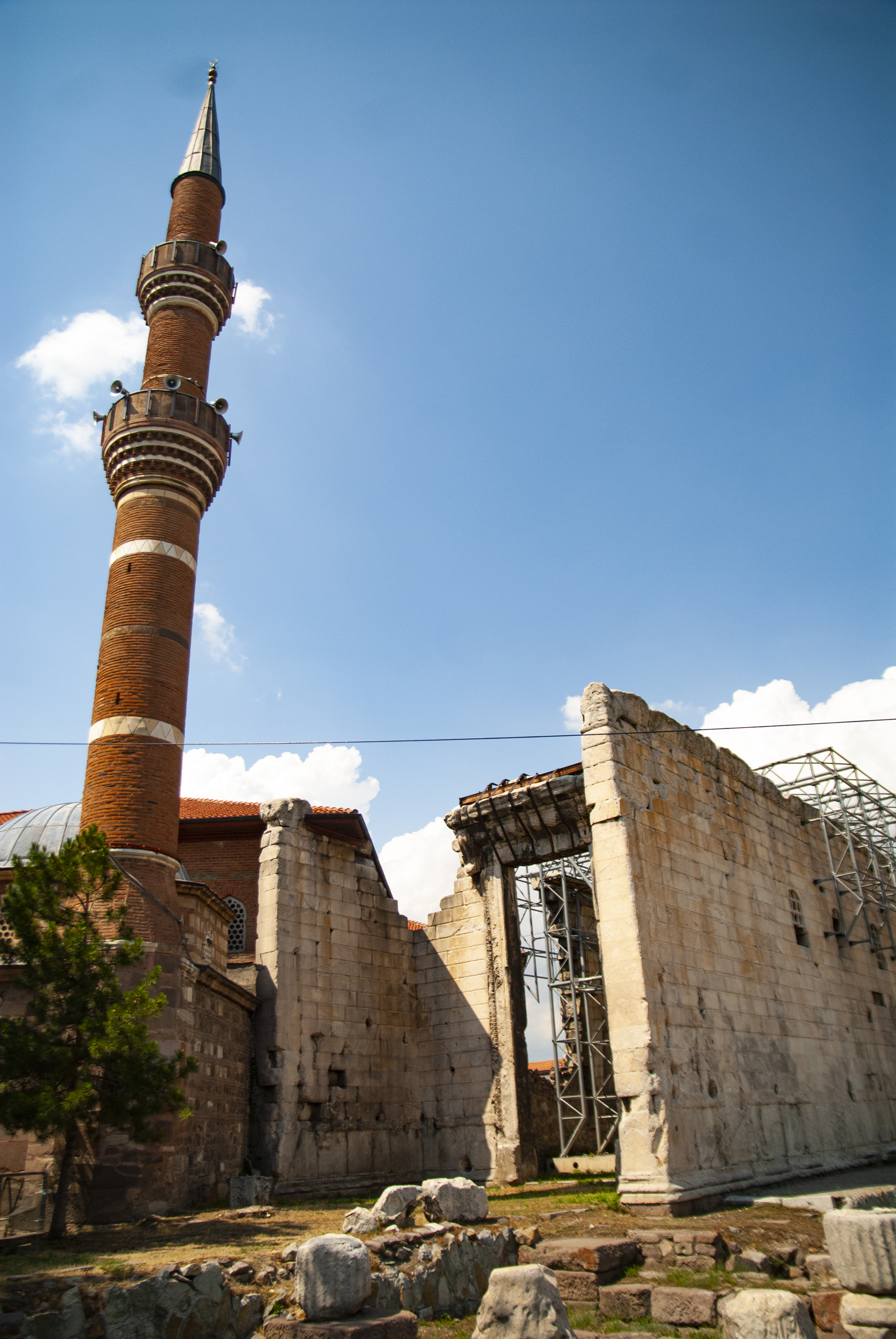
Front view of the cella (looking NE). The latin Res Gestae is on the interior of the pronaos walls and the greek translation is on the outside of the south wall.

== Copies ==
A life-size reproduction of the pronaos, including the text of the Deeds, was erected in the gardens of the Baths of Diocletian in Rome for the Archaeological Exhibition of the 1911 Rome World's Fair. After the fair, it was put in storage until it was displayed at the Mostra Augustea della Romanità in 1937. After WWII, it was moved to Room IX of the new Museo della Civiltà Romana.

== See also ==
- Temple of Roma and Augustus
- List of Ancient Roman temples
