= Noun ellipsis =

Linguistic elliptical construction omitting a noun

Noun ellipsis (N-ellipsis), also noun phrase ellipsis (NPE), is a mechanism that elides, or appears to elide, part of a noun phrase that can be recovered from context. The mechanism occurs in many languages like English, which uses it less than related languages.

Theoretical analyses of N-ellipsis vary, with at least three types of approaches to the phenomenon that a theory can pursue: 1) the true ellipsis analysis, 2) the covert pronoun analysis, and 3) the overt pronoun analysis.

== Examples ==
Standard instances of N-ellipsis in English are introduced by a limited set of determiner- and adjective-like elements (possessives, cardinal and ordinal numbers, other quantifiers). In the examples throughout this article, the ellipsis is indicated using a smaller font and subscripts, the element that introduces the ellipsis is in bold, and the antecedent to the ellipsis is underlined:

When Susan brings her dog, Sam brings his _{dog} too. - N-ellipsis introduced by possessive
Jill likes your story even though she hates Bill's _{story}. - N-ellipsis introduced by possessive -s

Because you bought two donuts, I bought three _{donuts}. - N-ellipsis introduced by cardinal number
I caught the first train before you caught the second _{train}. - N-ellipsis introduced by ordinal number

Some school kids like syntax, and some _{school kids} don't. - N-ellipsis introduced by a quantifier
Each student was helped so that each _{student} would understand. - N-ellipsis introduced by a quantifier

The set of elements that can introduce N-ellipsis in English is limited. Similar quantificational elements, for instance, cannot introduce N-ellipsis:

*No school kid likes syntax, and no _{school kid} likes semantics. - Failed attempt to introduce N-ellipsis with no
*Every student was helped, so that every _{student} would understand. - Failed attempt to introduce N-ellipsis with every

Most adjectives in English are also incapable of introducing N-ellipsis:

*Fred watches stupid programs, but Jim watches intelligent _{programs}. - Failed attempt to introduce N-ellipsis with a standard adjective
*I value long walks although I only get to take short _{walks}. - Failed attempt to introduce N-ellipsis with a standard adjective

This aspect of N-ellipsis in English distinguishes English from other languages (e.g. German and Dutch), which are much more permissive; they allow almost any determiner or adjective to introduce N-ellipsis. Note that English employs the indefinite pronoun one to make such sentences acceptable, e.g. Fred watches stupid programs, but Jim watches intelligent ones.

The examples so far all have the ellipsis following its antecedent. The opposite arrangement is also possible: the N-ellipsis can precede its "antecedent":

If he brings his _{dog}, I'll bring my dog too. - N-ellipsis preceding its "antecedent"
Because he did the first two _{problems}, she is going to do that last three problems. - N-ellipsis preceding its "antecedent"
Even though he skipped one _{task}, he did do the rest of the tasks. - N-ellipsis preceding its "antecedent"

N-ellipsis behaves like standard personal pronouns in this area; personal pronouns can also precede their antecedents at times, e.g. When he arrives, Bill immediately takes a shower.

== Systematic variation ==
There is systematic variation in forms across some noun phrases that do and do not involve N-ellipsis. This variation is apparent in English with possessives. Possessive determiners cannot introduce N-ellipsis, whereas one can interpret possessive pronouns as doing so. The following table summarizes the competing forms:

Possessive determiner	Possessive pronoun
my	mine
your	yours
his	his
her	hers
our	ours
their	theirs

The possessive determiners are systematically incapable of introducing N-ellipsis; if a possessive appears in such cases, it must be the possessive pronoun:

a. *You like your dog, but you don't like my _{dog}. - Possessive determiner my cannot introduce N-ellipsis
b. You like your dog, but you don't like mine _{dog}. - Possessive pronoun mine can introduce N-ellipsis

a. *We helped your friends, before we helped our _{friends}. - Possessive determiner our cannot introduce N-ellipsis
b. We helped your friends, before we helped ours _{friends}. - Possessive pronoun ours can introduce N-ellipsis

This same sort of data occurs in numerous other languages, where the variation is visible with many other determiner- and adjective-like elements (not just with possessives). The obvious conclusion that one can reach based upon this variation is that the possessive pronouns are in fact in no way introducing N-ellipsis, but rather they are, as their name suggests, simply pronouns. In other words, there is no ellipsis in such cases. This observation is important for the theory N-ellipsis in general, and the discussion returns to the point below.

== The elided material ==
An important aspect of N-ellipsis concerns the material that can (and cannot) be elided. Much more than just a noun can be included in the ellipsis, e.g.

a. Susan likes her big red fish with a stripe and Tom likes his _{big red fish with a stripe} too.
b. Susan likes her big red fish with a stripe and Tom likes his _{big red fish} with spots.

a. I will read your first long draft on gapping from last semester if you read my second _{long draft on gapping from last semester}.
b. I will read your first long draft on gapping from last semester if you read mine _{first long draft on gapping} from this semester.
c. I will read your long draft on gapping from last semester if you read mine _{long draft} on stripping.

The preferred readings for these sentences are the ones indicated by the underlines and small subscripts. Each time, N-ellipsis appears to be eliding more than just the noun. A more extensive examination of such data would demonstrate that N-ellipsis elides minimally a noun and maximally everything else in the noun phrase that follows the word that introduces the ellipsis. At times, the elided material can appear medially in the noun phrase, as just illustrated here with the b- and c-examples. A related point is that N-ellipsis must be introduced by a pre-noun element in the noun phrase. In other words, the ellipsis cannot be phrase-initial, e.g.

*He likes papers about gapping and she likes _{papers} about stripping. - Failed attempt at N-ellipsis; the ellipsis must be "introduced"
*We have pictures of Sam, and we have _{pictures} of Bill too. - Failed attempt at N-ellipsis; the ellipsis must be "introduced"

These data are (also) important because they bear on the formal account of N-ellipsis, a point that is considered in the next section.

== Theoretical possibilities ==
There are three basic possibilities that one might pursue in order to develop a formal account of N-ellipsis:

1) N-ellipsis is truly ellipsis; part of the noun phrase has indeed been elided.

2) A covert pronoun is present, which means ellipsis in the traditional sense is actually not involved.

3) An overt pronoun is present; the word that appears to introduce the ellipsis is actually functioning like a pronoun, which means ellipsis is in no way present.

Each of these three analyses is illustrated here using tree structures of an example NP. The example sentence She gave the first talk on gapping, and he gave the first on stripping is the context, whereby the trees focus just on the structure of the noun phrase showing ellipsis. For each of the three theoretical possibilities, both a constituency-based representation (associated with phrase structure grammars) and a dependency-based representation (associated with dependency grammars) is employed:

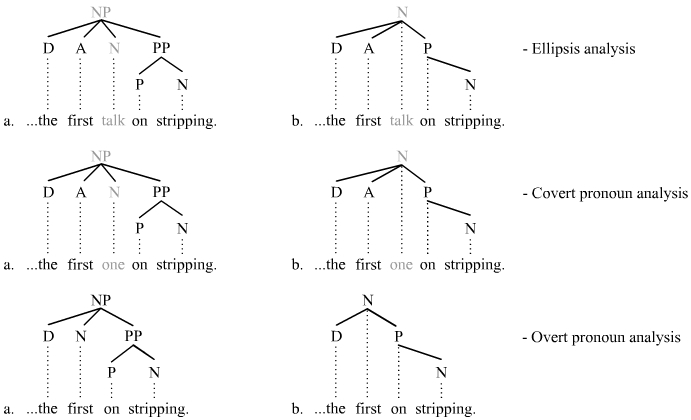

The constituency trees are on the left, and the corresponding dependency trees on the right. These trees are merely broadly representative of each of the possible analyses (many modern constituency grammars would likely reject the relatively flat structures on the left, opting instead for more layered trees). The ellipsis analysis assumes the presence of the elided noun. The null pronoun analysis also assumes ellipsis, but what is absent is not an actual noun, but rather it is a covert pronoun that would perhaps surface as one if it were not elided. The overt pronoun analysis entirely rejects the notion that ellipsis is involved. Instead, it grants the one pre-nominal element the status of an indefinite pronoun.

Each of these three analyses has its strengths and weaknesses, and which analysis is preferred varies based in part on the theoretical framework adopted. The traditional ellipsis analysis has an advantage insofar as it is the most straightforward; a simple ellipsis mechanism is involved, which explains the fact that ellipsis in such cases is (usually) optional. The ellipsis analysis cannot, however, so easily account for the systematic variation in forms seen with possessives, since it suggests that there should be no such variation. The covert pronoun analysis can easily accommodate the fact that N-ellipsis has a distribution that is close to that of the indefinite pronoun one, but it too has difficulty with the systematic variation in forms seen with possessives. Both analyses are challenged by the fact that they cannot explain why N-ellipsis is limited in occurrence in English to a relatively small number of pre-nominal elements. Both are also challenged by the observation that the null element must be "introduced".

The third analysis, the overt pronoun analysis, accommodates the systematic variation in possessive forms, since it assumes that the distinct pronoun forms appear precisely in order to indicate when a pronoun is present. The overt pronoun analysis can also account for the relatively small number of pre-nominal elements that can "introduce" ellipsis, since it reduces this ability down to a simple lexical characteristic of the pre-nominal elements involved. Furthermore, it quite obviously accounts for the fact that the "ellipsis" must be introduced, for there is in fact no ellipsis, but rather a pronoun appears.

The overt pronoun analysis is challenged, however, by other data. The overt pronouns would have to be unlike most other pronouns, since they would have to allow modification by an adverb, e.g. You took the second train after I had taken the very first. The adverb very is modifying first, which should not be possible if first is a pronoun.

In sum, the theoretical analysis of N-ellipsis is open to innovation.

== Literature ==
- Corver, N. and M. van Koppen 2009. Let's Focus on Noun Phrase Ellipsis. In: J.-W. Zwart (ed.), Groninger Arbeiten zur germanistischen Linguistik 48, 3–26.
- Lobeck, A. 1995. Ellipsis: Functional heads, licensing, and identification. New York: Oxford University Press.
- Netter, K. 1996. Functional categories in an HPSG for German, volume 3 of Saarbrücken Dissertations in Computational Linguistics and Language Technology.
- Werner, E. 2011. The ellipsis of "ellipsis". A reanalysis of "elided" noun phrase structures in German. Master's Thesis, Utrecht University.
- Winhart, H. 1997. Die Nominalphrase in einem HPSG-Fragment des Deutschen. In E. Hinrichs et al. eds., Ein HPSG-Fragment des Deutschen. Teil 1: Theorie, chapter 5, pages 319{384. Universität Tübingen, Tübingen.

== See also ==
- Dependency grammar
- Ellipsis
- Phrase structure grammar
