= Res Gestae Divi Augusti =

Funerary inscription of the first Roman emperor, Augustus

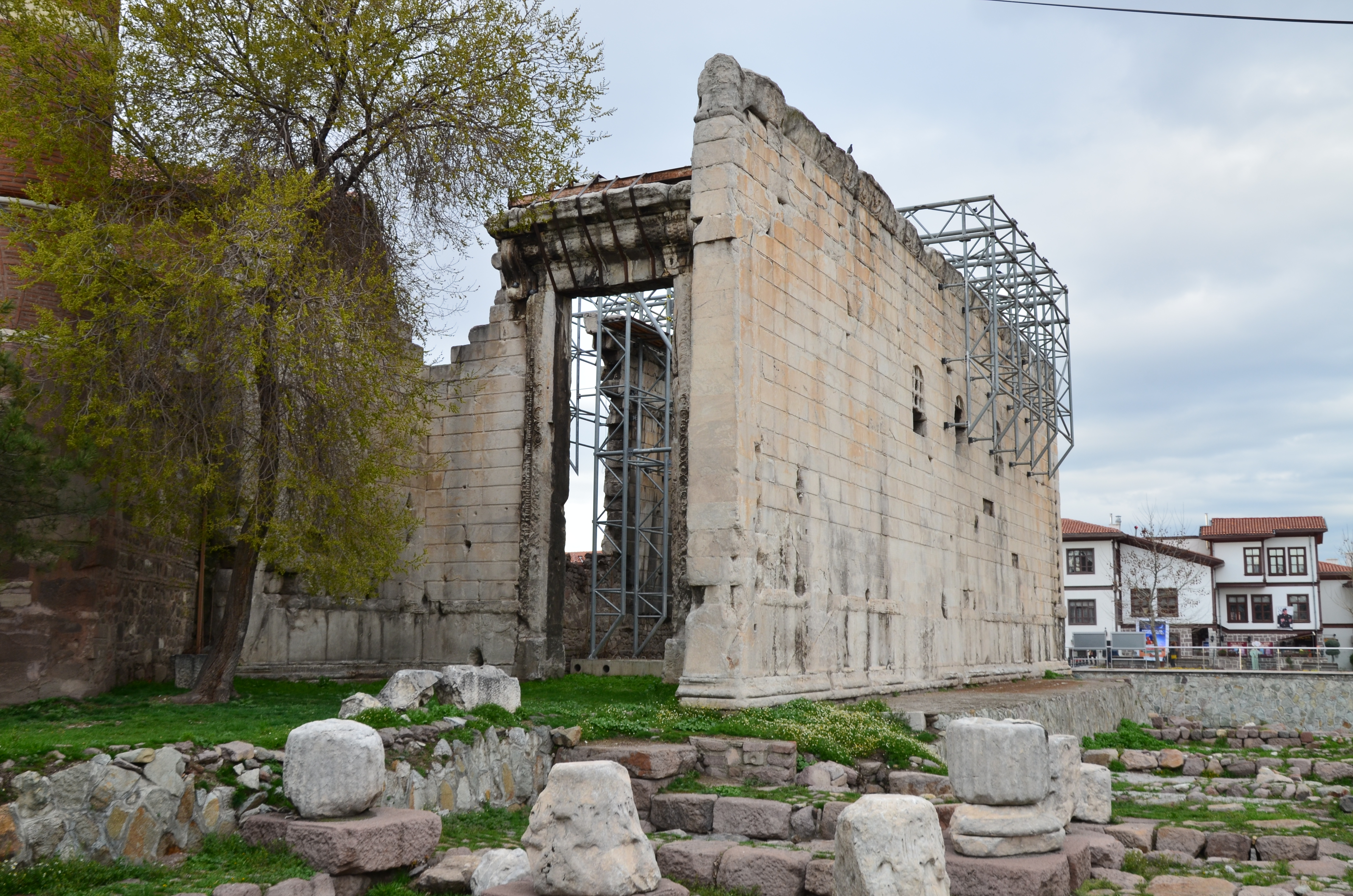
- The Monumentum Ancyranum was inscribed on the walls of the Augusteum in Ankara, Turkey. It is the most complete copy of the Res Gestae.

General Information
- Dynasty: Julio-Claudians
- Script: Latin and Greek majuscule
- Language: Classical Latin and Ancient Greek
- Condition: Extant
- Culture: Ancient Rome

Discovery
- Place found: Various
- Current location: Roman Empire

Contents of the Inscription
- Author: Augustus

Location and Status

Res Gestae Divi Augusti (contemporaneous and authorised Ancient Greek translation: πράξεις τε καὶ δωρεαὶ Σεβαστοῦ θεοῦ; Eng. The Deeds of the Divine Augustus) is a monumental inscription composed by the first Roman emperor, Augustus, giving a first-person record of his life and accomplishments. The Res Gestae is especially significant because it gives an insight into the image Augustus presented to the Roman people. Various portions of the Res Gestae have been found in modern Turkey. The inscription itself is a monument to the establishment of the Julio-Claudian dynasty that was to follow Augustus.

== Structure ==
The text consists of a short introduction, 35 body paragraphs and a posthumous addendum. The paragraphs are conventionally grouped into four sections: political career, public benefactions, military accomplishments and a political statement.

The first section (paragraphs 2–14) is concerned with Augustus' political career; it records the offices and political honours that he held. Augustus also lists numerous offices he refused to take and privileges he refused to be awarded. The second section (paragraphs 15–24) lists Augustus' donations of money, land and grain to the citizens of Italy and his soldiers, as well as the public works and gladiatorial spectacles that he commissioned. The text is careful to point out that all this was paid for out of Augustus' own funds. The third section (paragraphs 25–33) describes his military deeds and how he established alliances with other nations during his reign. Finally the fourth section (paragraphs 34–35) consists of a statement of the Romans' approval for the reign and deeds of Augustus. The appendix is written in the third person rather than first person used in the previous sections, and is likely not by Augustus himself, but written for the benefit of provincial readers of the text. It summarizes the entire text, lists various buildings that he renovated or constructed and states that Augustus spent 600 million silver denarii (24 million gold aurei) from his own funds during his reign on public projects. Ancient currencies cannot be reliably converted into modern equivalents, but it is clearly more than anyone else in the empire could afford. Augustus consolidated his hold on power by reversing the prior tax policy beginning with funding the aerarium militare with 170 million sesterces of his own money. In order to depict himself as the most generous of all the Romans.

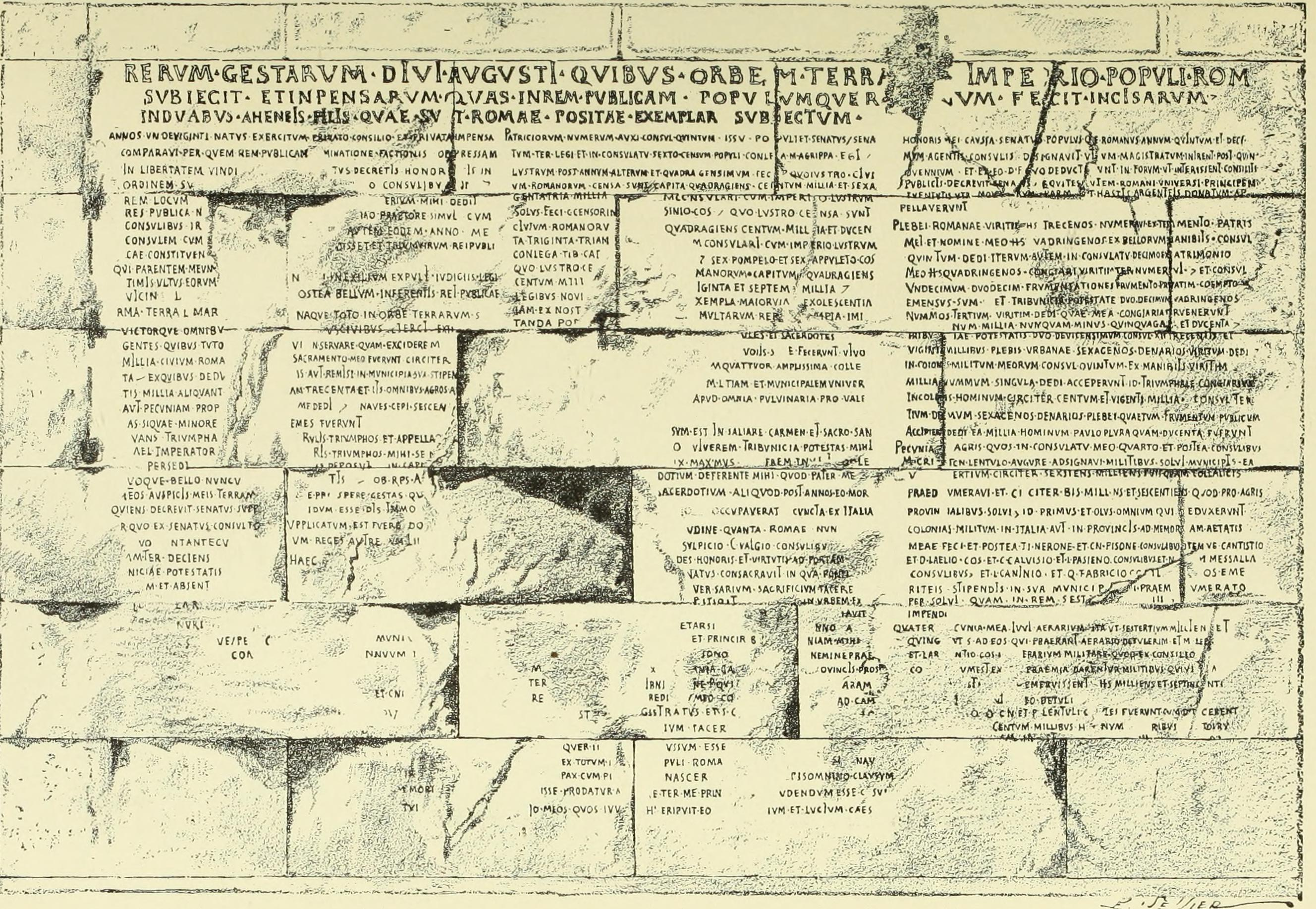
Drawing of the Res Gestae Divi Augusti

== History ==
The text was completed just one month before Augustus' death (19 August AD 14), although most of its content was written years earlier and likely went through many revisions. Augustus left the text with his will, which instructed the Senate to set up the inscriptions. The original, which has not survived, was engraved upon a pair of bronze pillars (incidentally, the use of bronze evoked ideals of sacrosanctity and durability, setting it on a par with Roman legal documents) and placed in front of Augustus' mausoleum, alongside further inscriptions that described the achievements of other members of his family. Many copies of the text were made and carved in stone on monuments or temples throughout the Roman Empire, some of which have survived; most notably, almost a full copy, written in the original Latin and a Greek translation was preserved on a temple to Augustus in Ancyra (the Monumentum Ancyranum of Ankara, Turkey); while others have been found at Apollonia (in Greek) and Antioch (in Latin), both in Pisidia. All three of these copies are found in the province of Galatia in central Asia Minor (modern-day Turkey). The Greek versions of the text found at these sites are not word for word translations of the corresponding Latin text, as they contain several errors and contain phrases more comprehensible to their provincial audience than the original Latin.

== Content ==
The text is not a full account of the years between 44 BC, the assassination of Augustus' adoptive father Julius Caesar, and AD 14, the year in which he died. Instead, it is a personal account of the first Emperor's life and those achievements that he decided to be worth remembering by the Roman people. The heading of the inscription defines it as 'a copy of the achievements of the deified Augustus, by which he made the world subject to the rule of the Roman people, and of the expenses which he incurred for the state and people of Rome'. It is an independent self-depiction that is written in a literary form which is unique to the ancient world, and it must be read as such. This period of history is seen from Augustus' perspective and the author presents facts that relate only to himself. Augustus' enemies are never mentioned by name. Caesar's murderers Brutus and Cassius are called simply "those who killed my father". Mark Antony and Sextus Pompey, Augustus' opponents in the East, remain equally anonymous; the former is "he with whom I fought the war," while the latter is merely a "pirate". One writer, Werner Eck, says that it cannot be stated that Augustus made any false statements. Any comprehensive understanding of this period of Roman history should be supplemented by statements from other ancient sources, archaeology, and inscriptions.

The introduction and first two pararagraphs of the inscription found at the Monumentum Ancyranum of Ankara read as such:

...Below is a copy of the acts of the Deified Augustus by which he placed the whole world under the sovereignty of the Roman people, and of the amounts which he expended upon the state and the Roman people, as engraved upon two bronze columns which have been set up in Rome.

At the age of nineteen, on my own initiative and at my own expense, I raised an army by means of which I restored liberty to the republic, which had been oppressed by the tyranny of a faction. For which service the senate, with complimentary resolutions, enrolled me in its order, in the consulship of Gaius Pansa and Aulus Hirtius, giving me at the same time consular precedence in voting; it also gave me the imperium. As propraetor it ordered me, along with the consuls, "to see that the republic suffered no harm." In the same year, moreover, as both consuls had fallen in war, the people elected me consul and a triumvir for settling the constitution.

Those who slew my father I drove into exile, punishing their deed by due process of law and afterwards when they waged war upon the republic I twice defeated them in battle.

The style of the work is varied across the different texts, in different languages. In Latin inscriptions the text focuses on the imperial strength of Rome and its role as a global empire, to which Augustus is credited as being the key reason for. However, in contrast the Greek version instead chooses to gloss over such remarks and re-phrases the tributes and conquest of the provinces as less harsh or even removing such parts, even as the beginning of the Greek text omits lines about Romans conquest. Various other instances emerge such as how Greeks often simplify Roman ideas or customs for Greek readers.

== Reception ==
Tacitus' Annals (Tacitus) suggests that the Res Gestae focuses only on trivialities. This implies a negative reception from the contemporary Roman audience. However there are positive Roman responses to the Res Gestae. Pausanias (geographer) writes on how Hadrian had inscriptions in the Acropolis that mirrored the Res Gestae. Like Augustus, Hadrian included many conquests he had won as well as the idea that he never entered a war unjustly. This then implies a more positive Roman reception though it is not contemporary to the time of the Res Gestae's writing.

The first European translations of the Res Gestae came possibly from an Ambassador from the Holy Roman Empire to the Ottoman Sultan in 1555. Though at first only parts could be read as the rest remained behind homes built by locals against the temple walls. However, in 1836 W J Hamilton negotiated with an owner of one of the homes to have it demolished, revealing 1/3 of the Greek text. Then in 1937/8 Mustafa Kemal Atatürk ordered the demolition of the remaining houses to mark the two thousandth anniversary of Augustus' birth. This also tied into the foundation of the modern Republic of Turkey.

However, by the 1920s the Fascist movement in Italy had co-opted the Res Gestae and other symbols of Roman imperialism to help justify their conquest and to inspire other Italians to fight for the fatherland. In 1938 a copy of the Res Gestae was set in bronze on the podium that supported the altar of Augustan Peace. Mussolini attended the opening ceremony of the altar on the 23rd of September 1938, showing the connection Mussolini used to Augustus to create an imperial image for himself. Hitler also viewed the altar and was recorded requesting a further visit for a second viewing due to adoration.

== Gallery ==
Res Gestae Divi Augusti in the Temple of Augustus and Rome
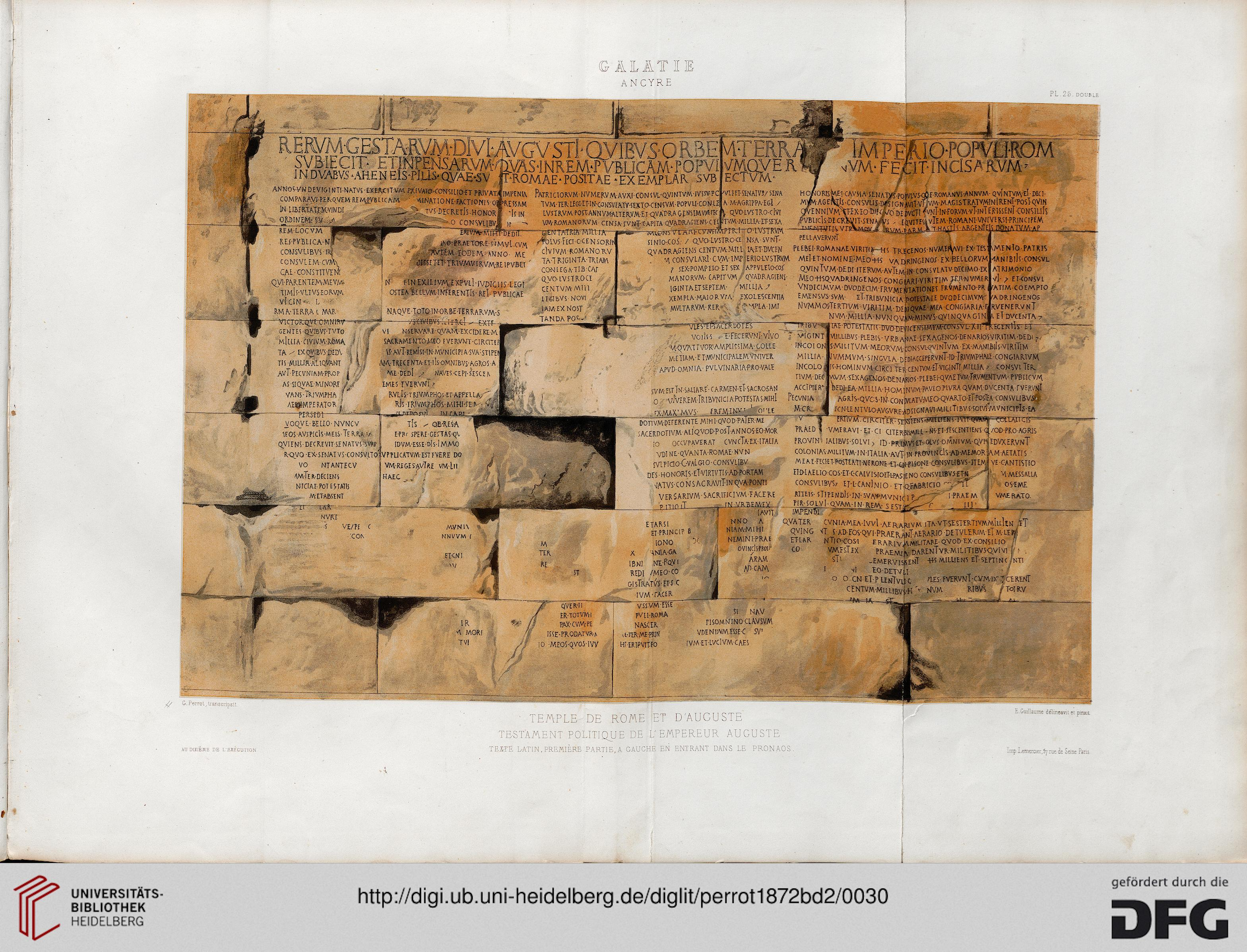
Illustration of the 1st part of the latin Res Gestae on the north wall of the pronaos of the Augusteum

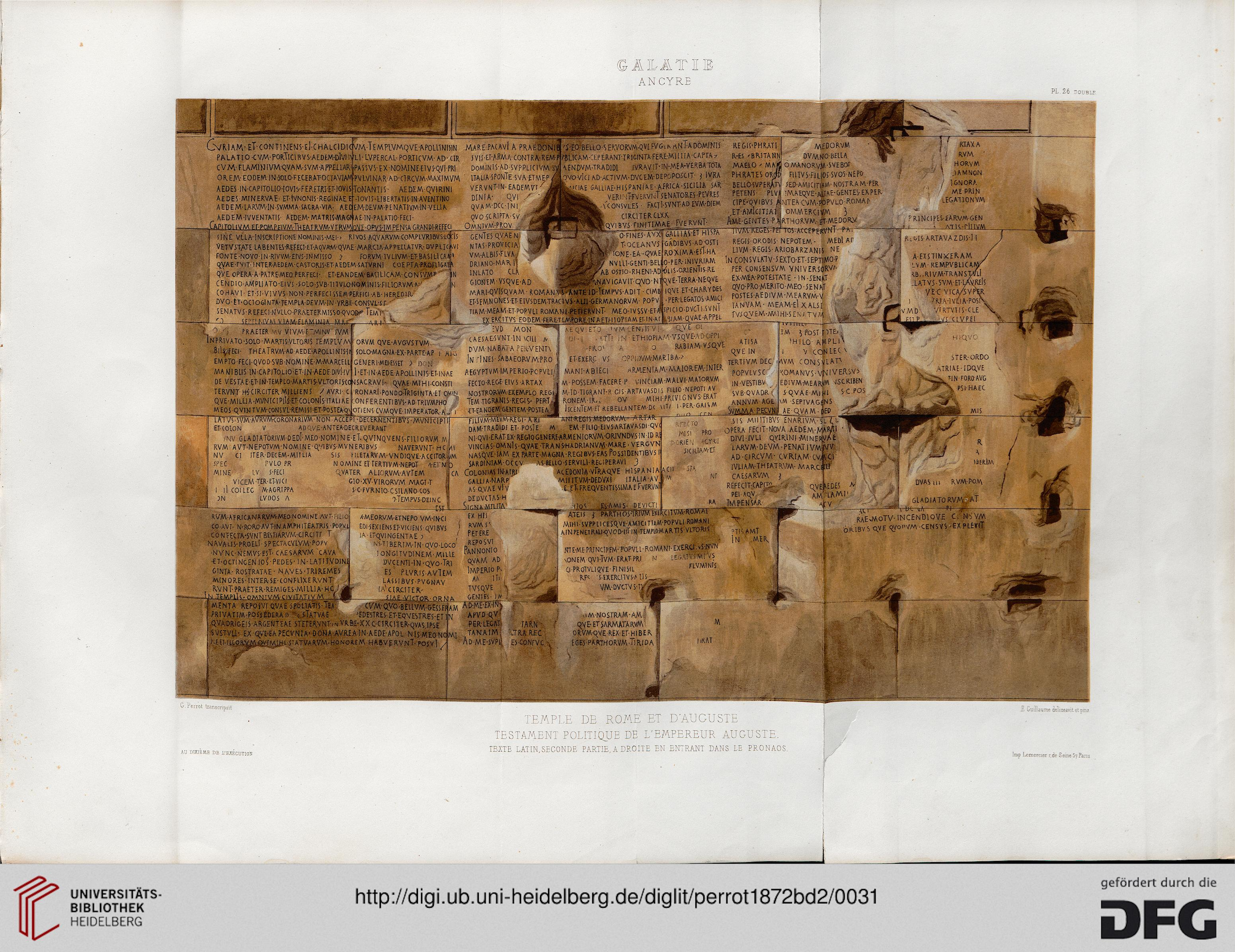
2nd part of the Res Gestae in the Monumentum Ancyranum on the south wall

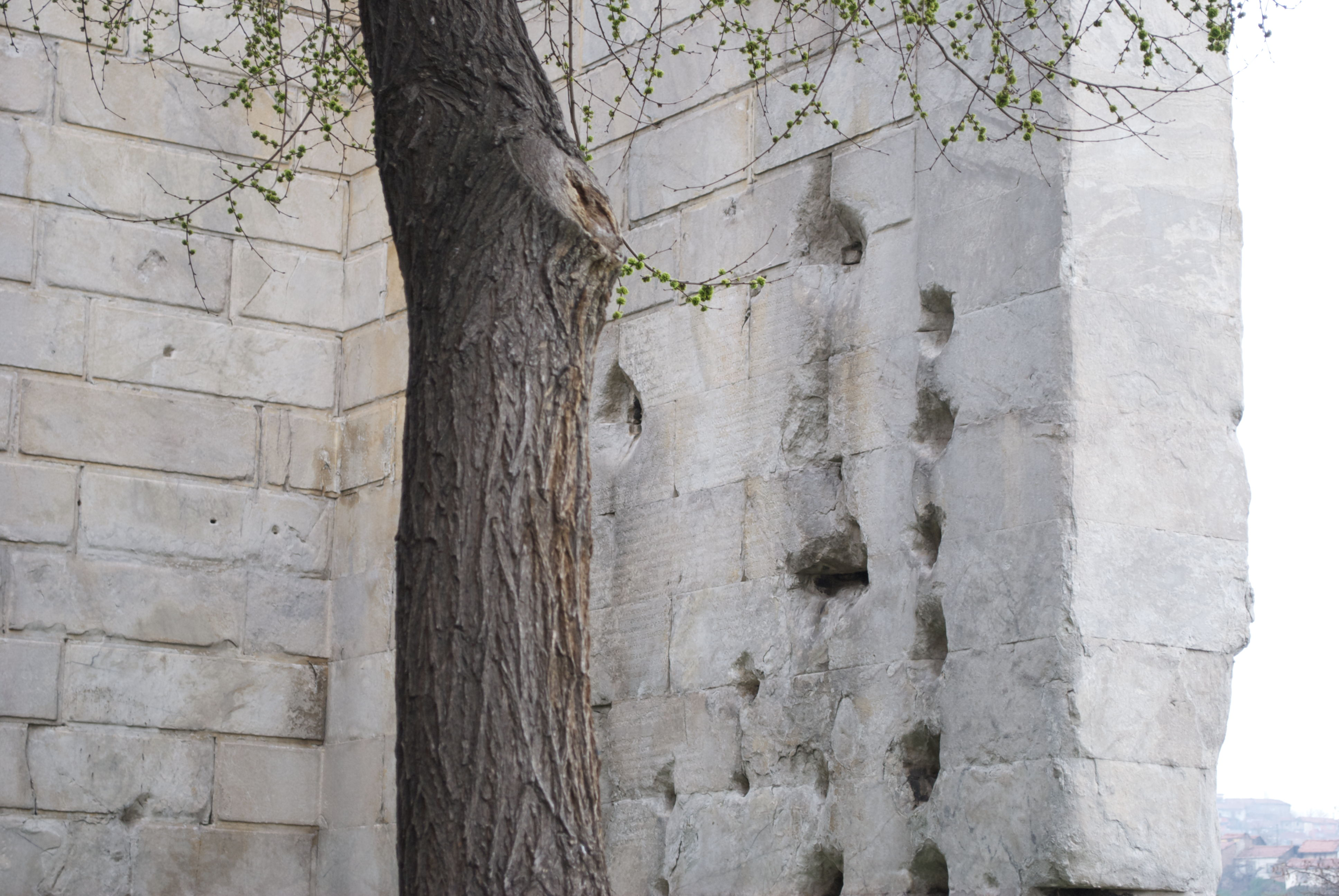
Interior view of the south wall of the pronaos

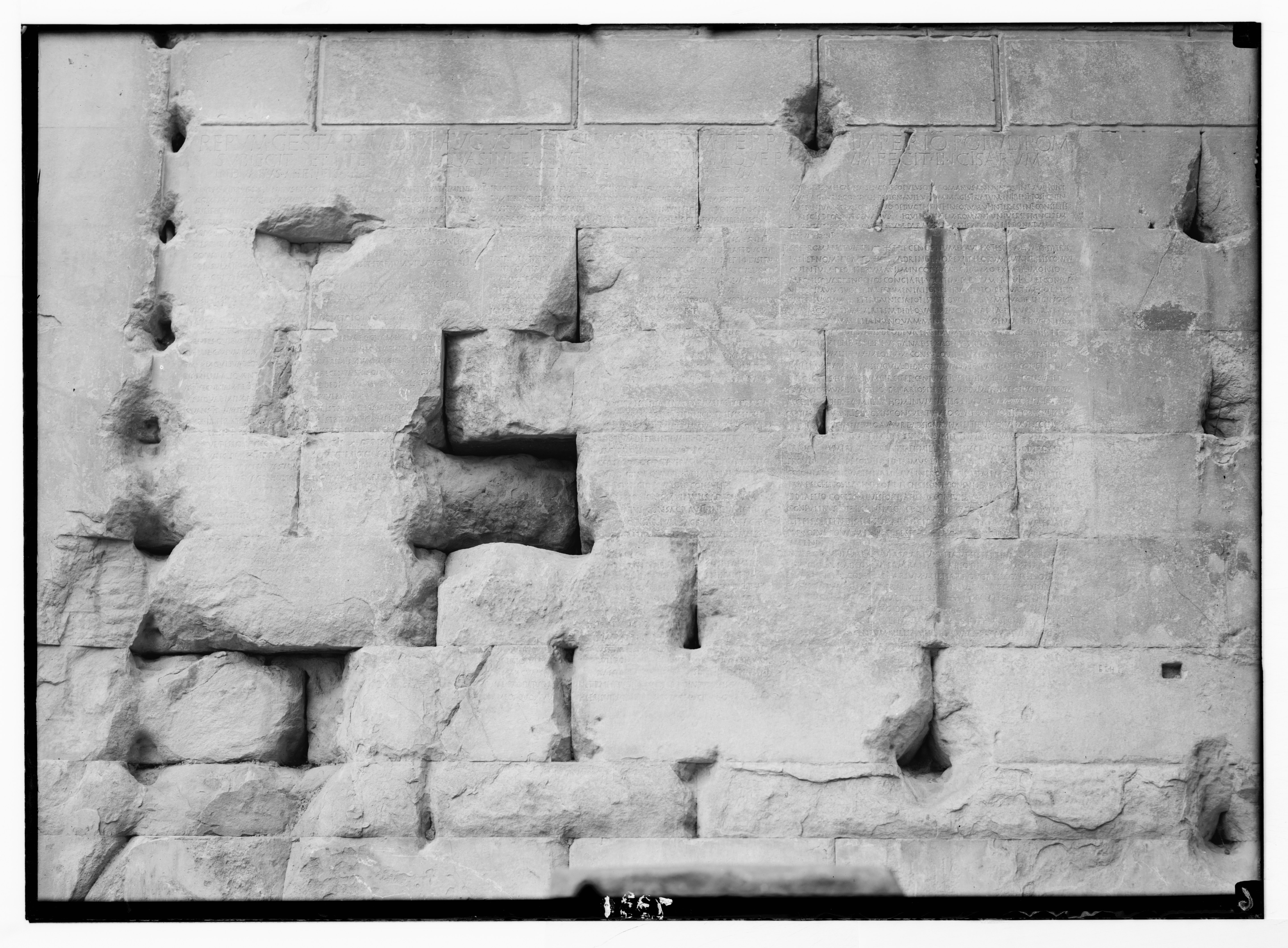
Photograph of the north wall interior

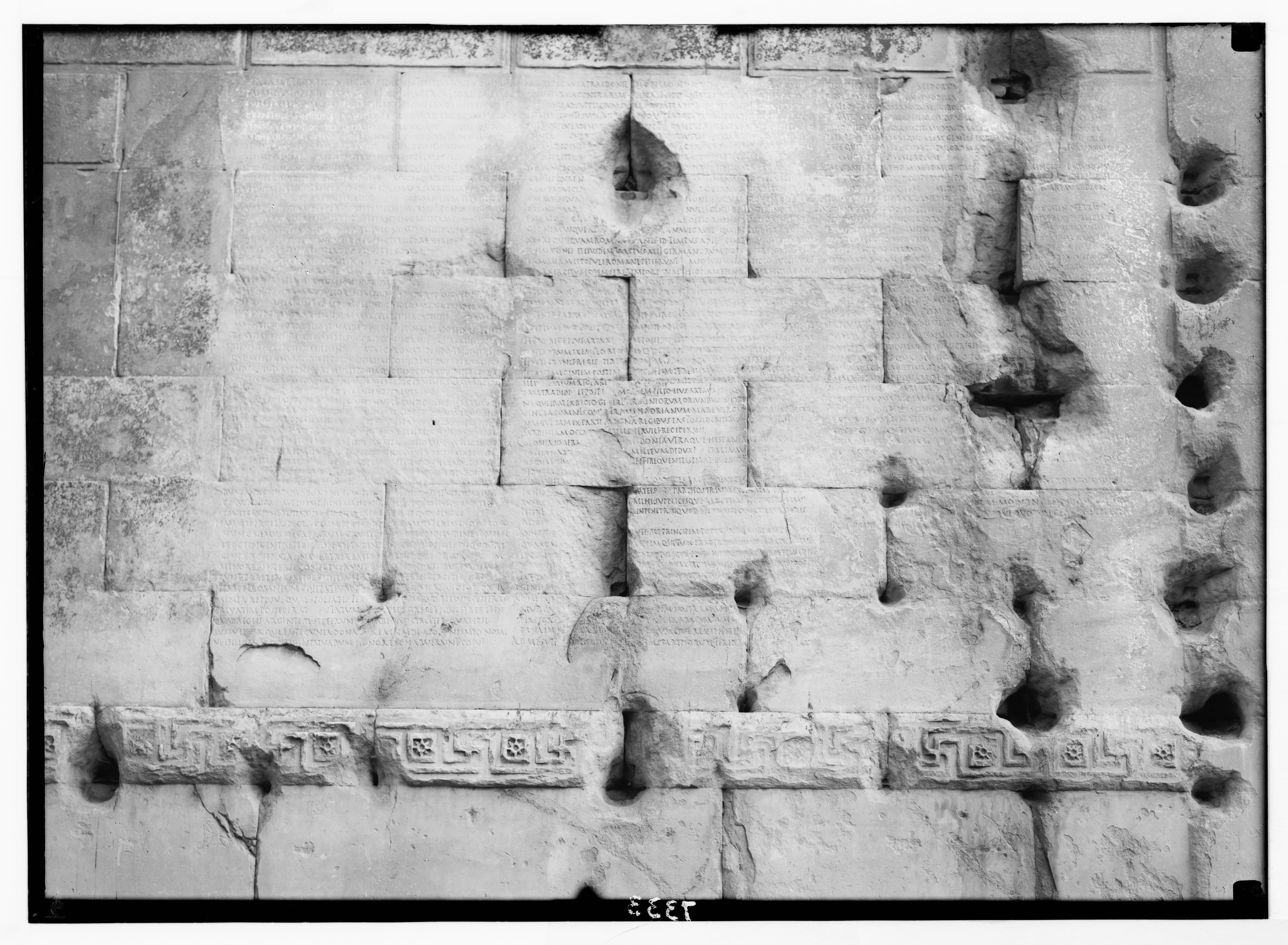
Photograph of the south wall interior

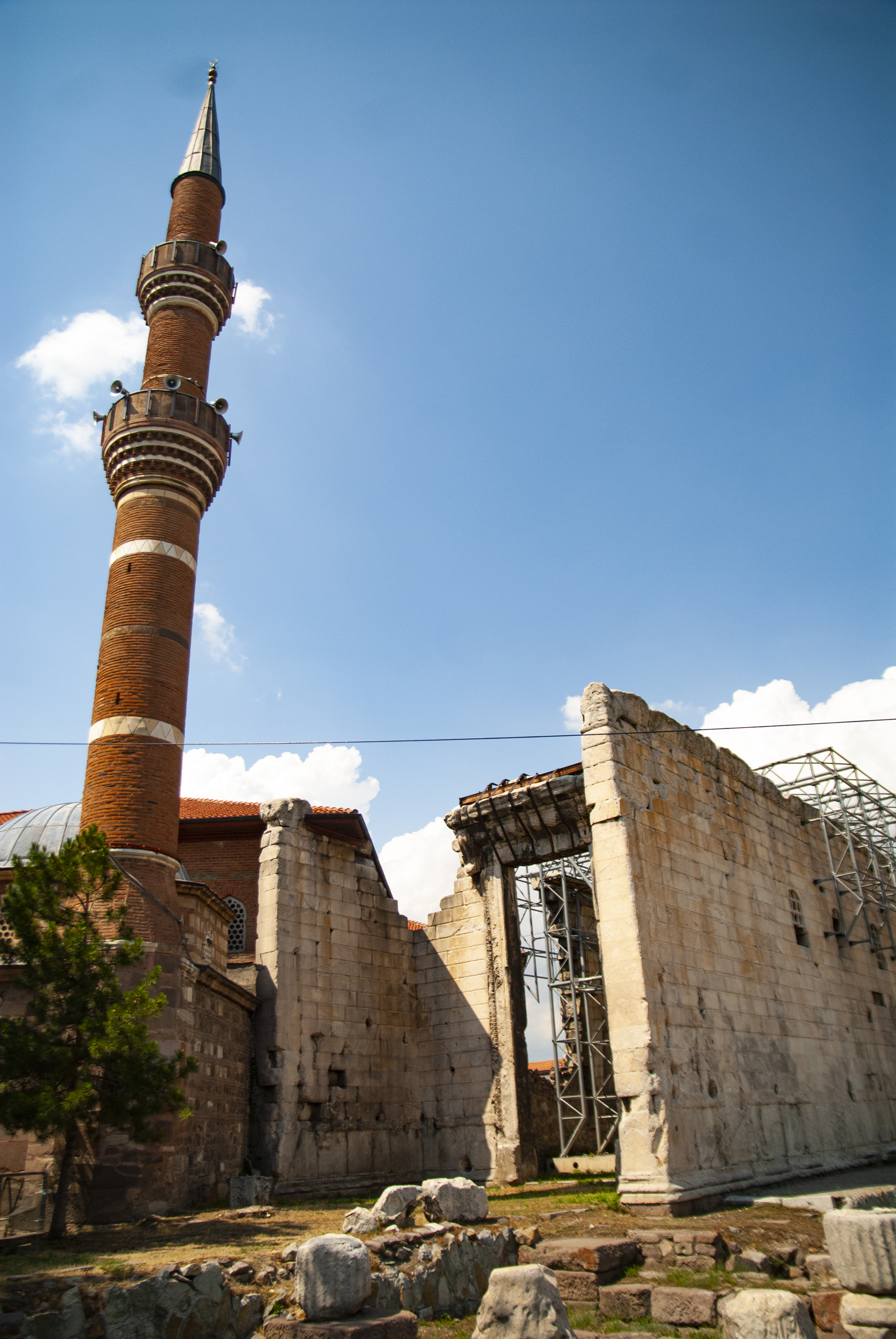
Front view of the cella (looking NE). The Latin Res Gestae is on the interior of the pronaos walls and the Greek translation is on the outside of the south wall.

== See also ==
- Lucius Cornelius Scipio Barbatus, whose sarcophagus carries a short inscription in Saturnian metre commemorating his deeds
- Behistun Inscription, commissioned by Darius I of Persia
- Res Gestae (disambiguation)
